= Nagpur =

City in Maharashtra, India

Nagpur Nāgapura (Marathi)
- Metropolis
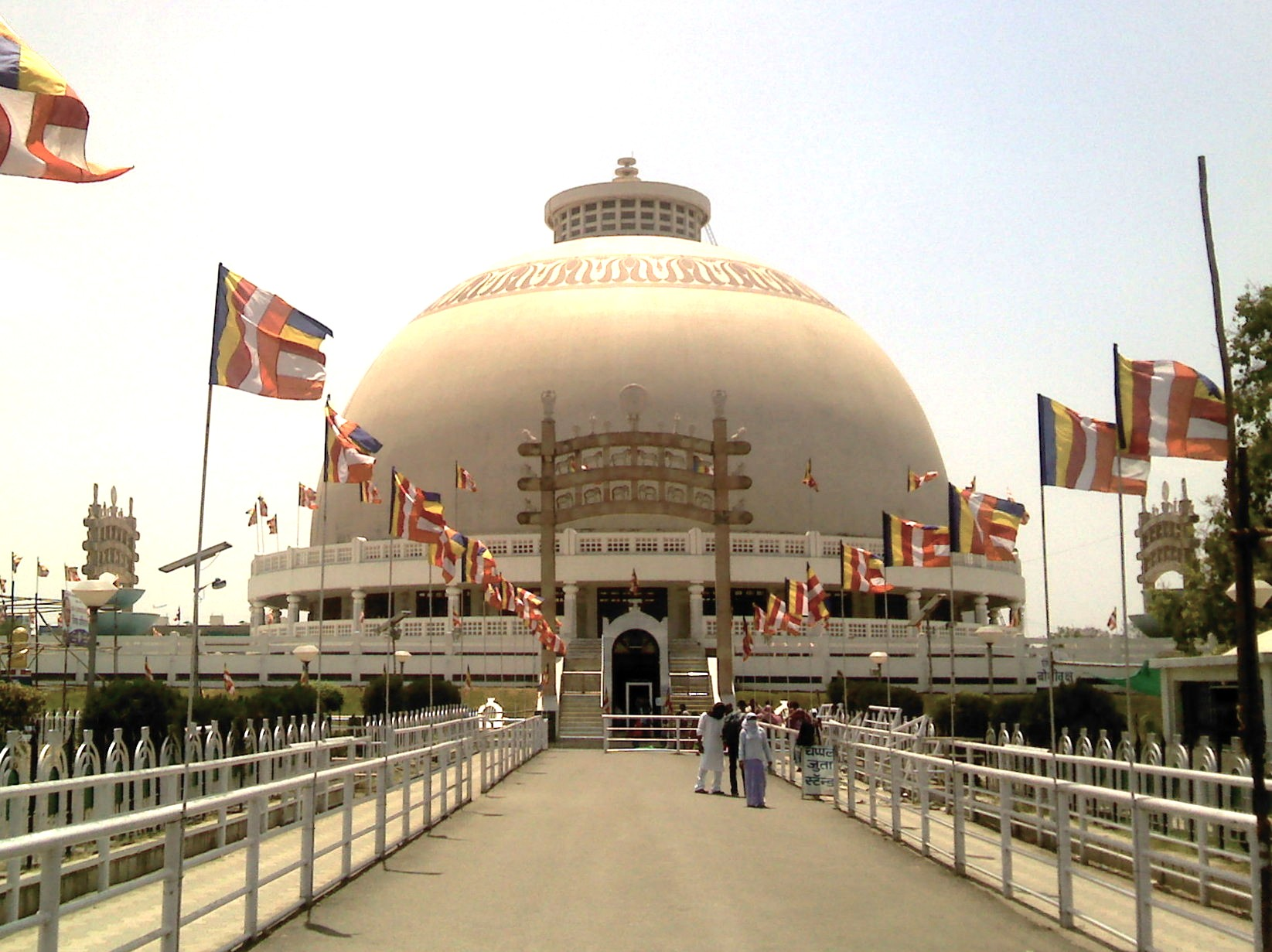
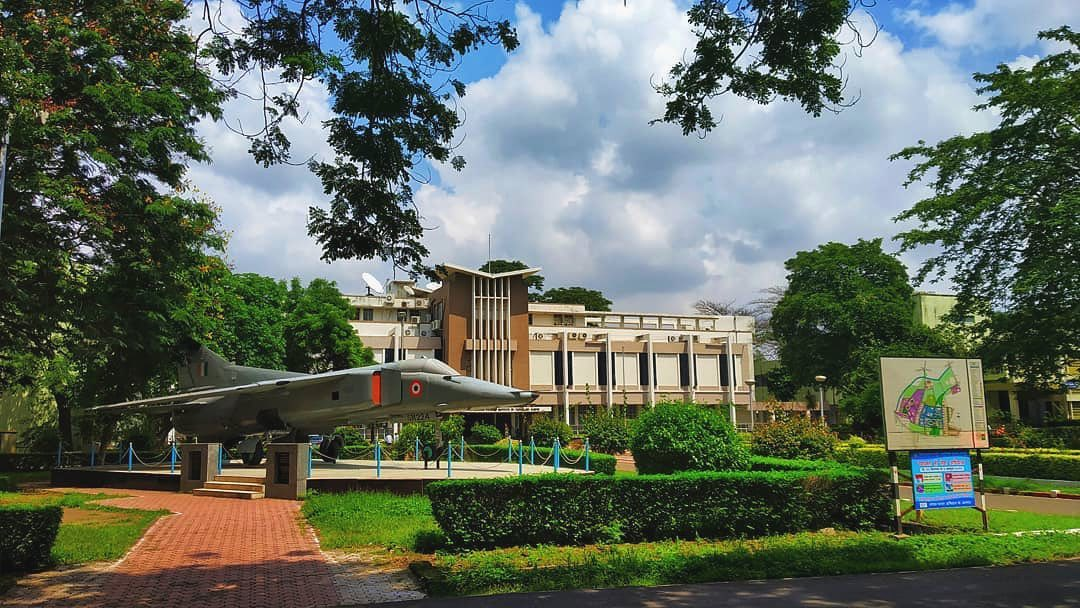
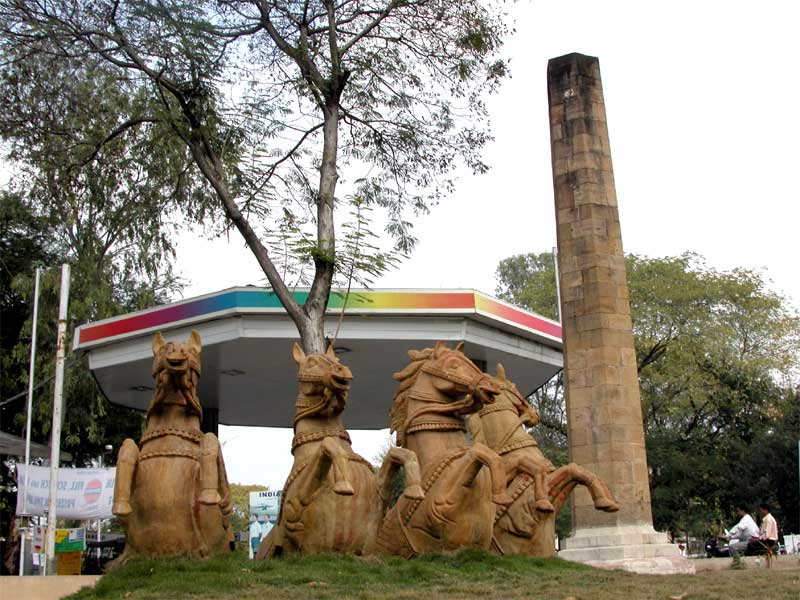
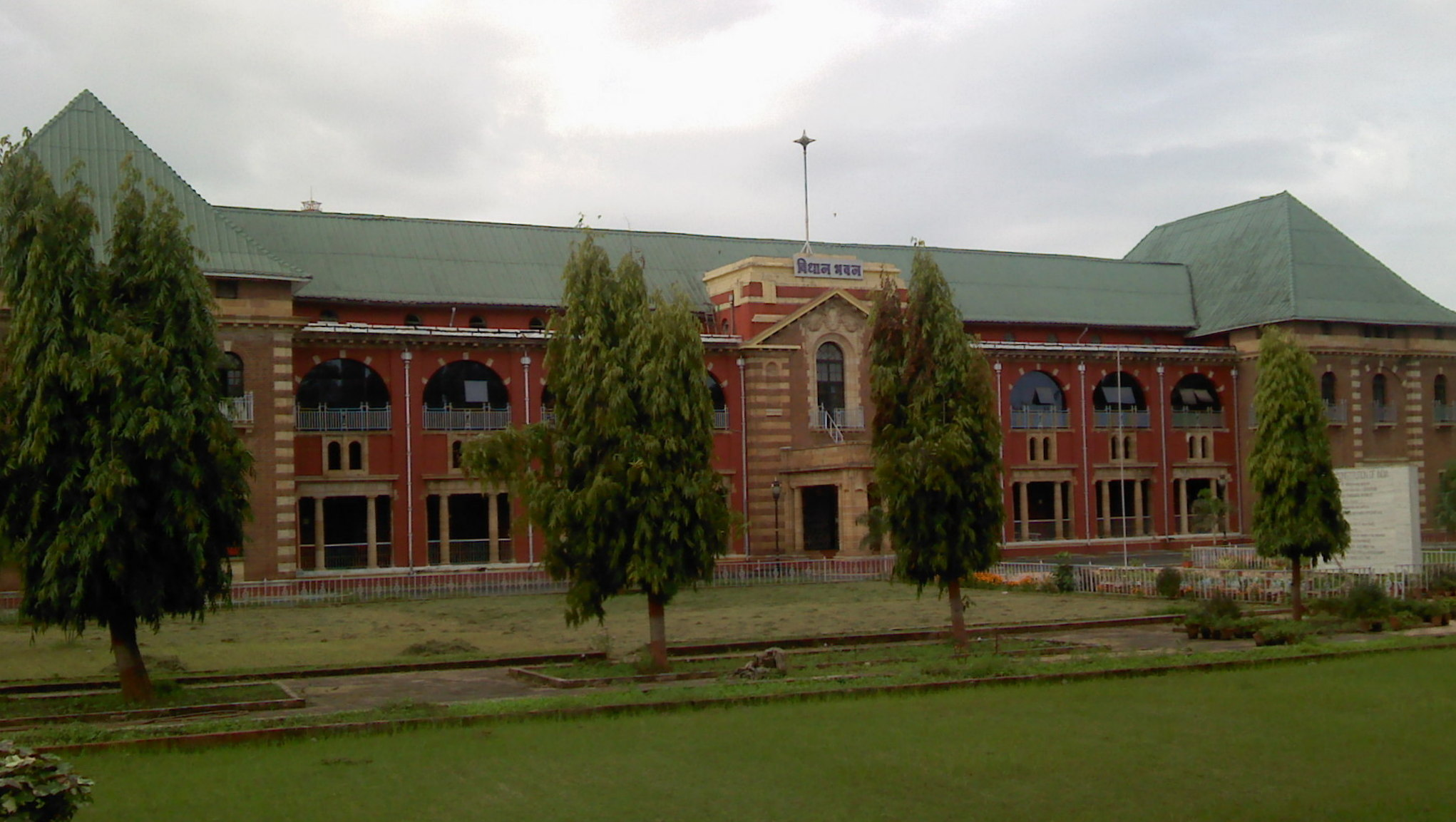
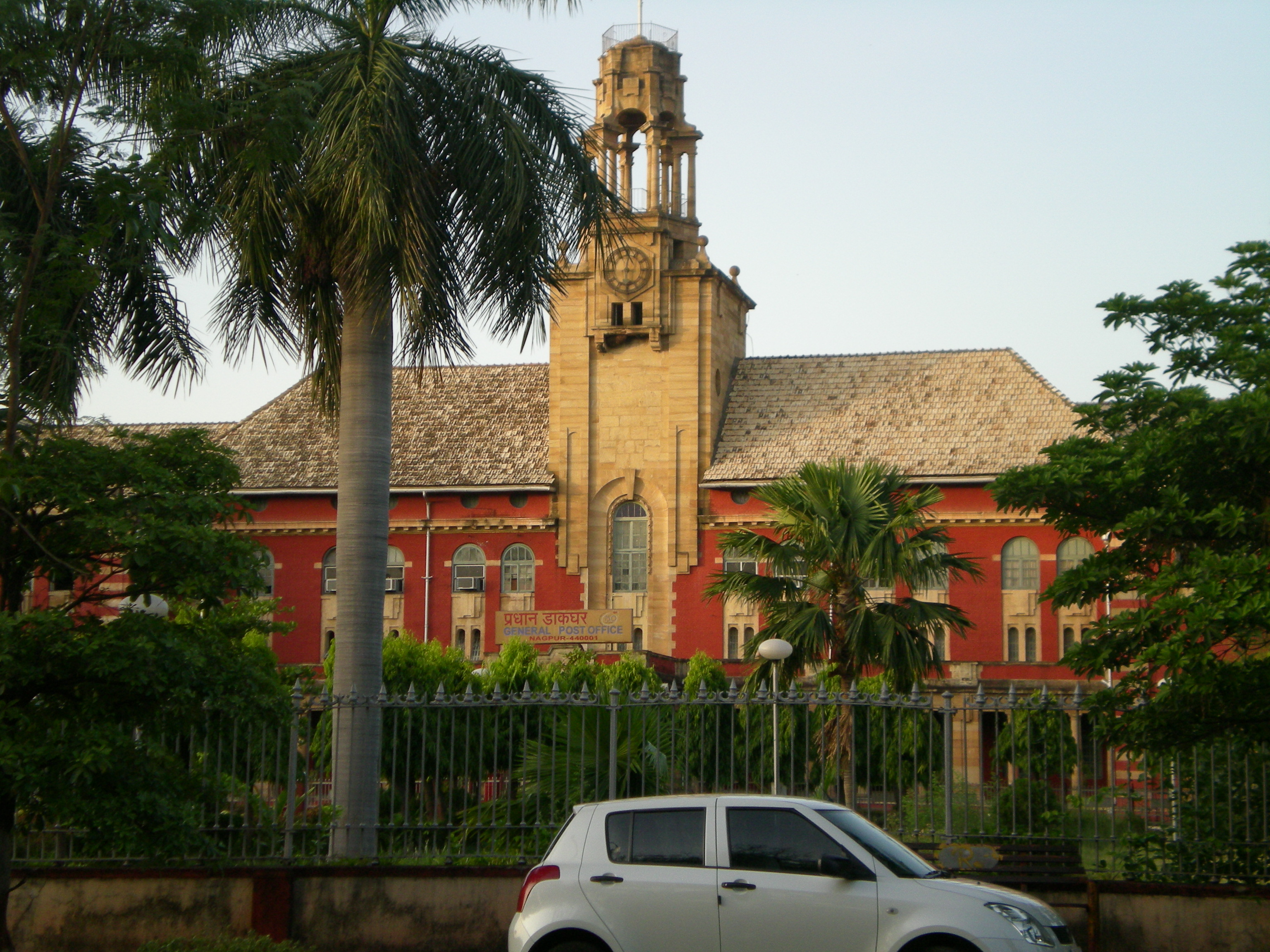
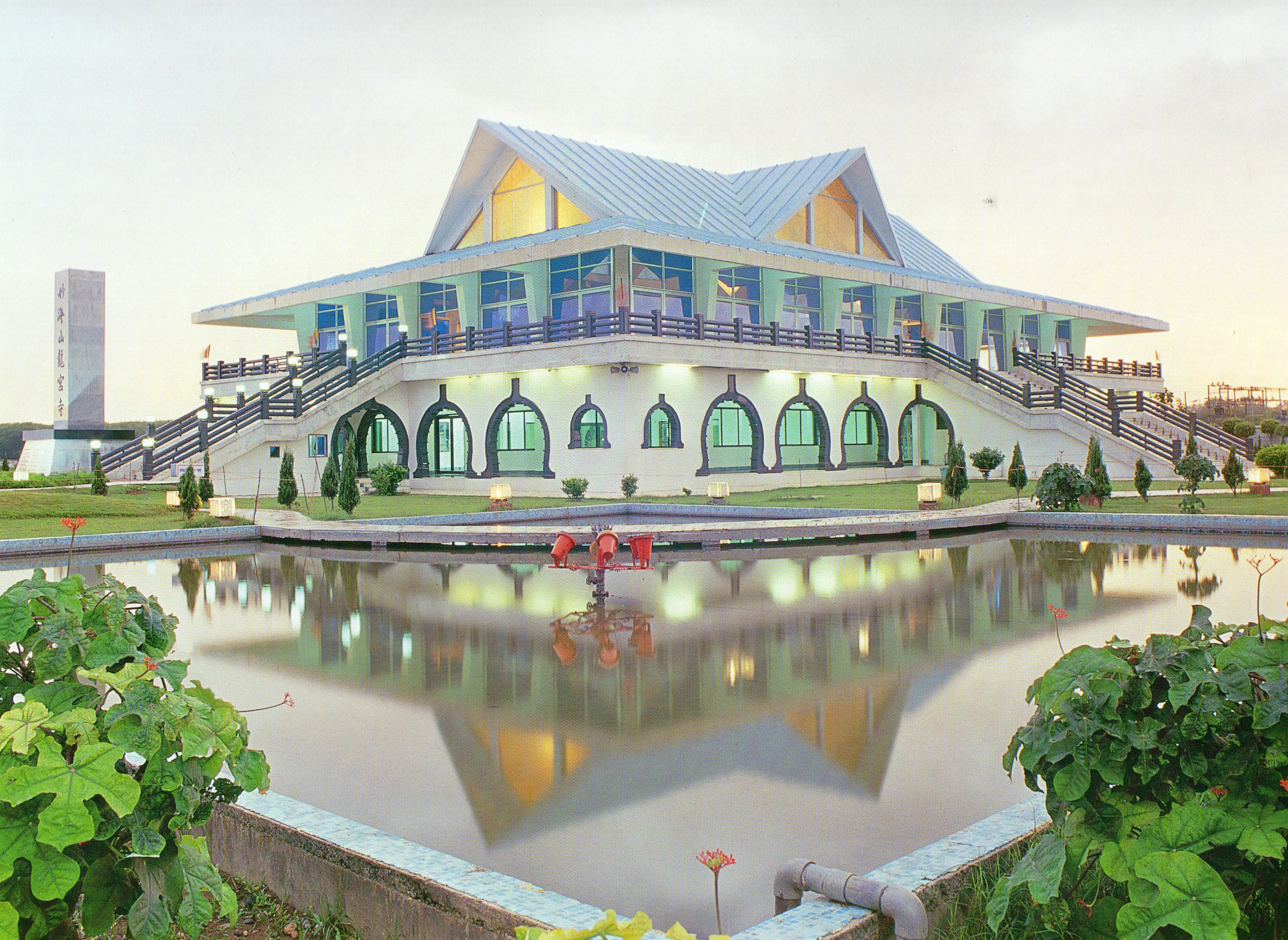
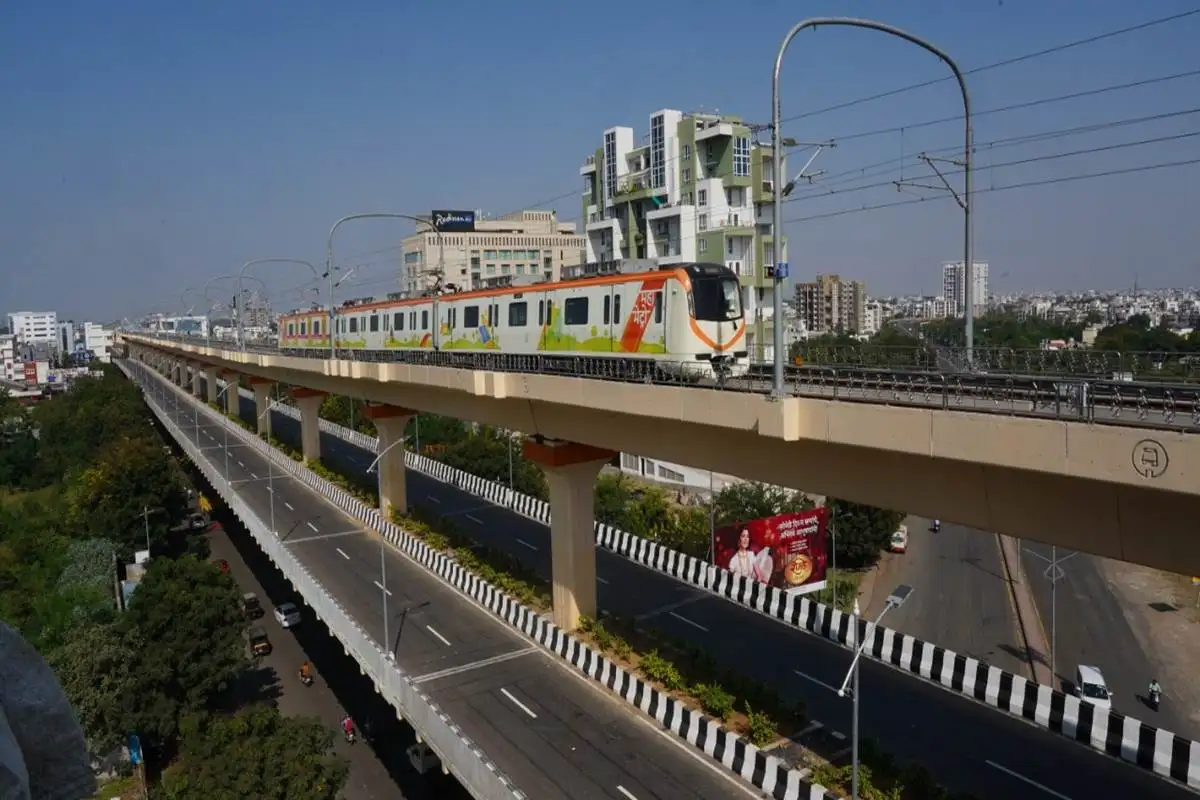
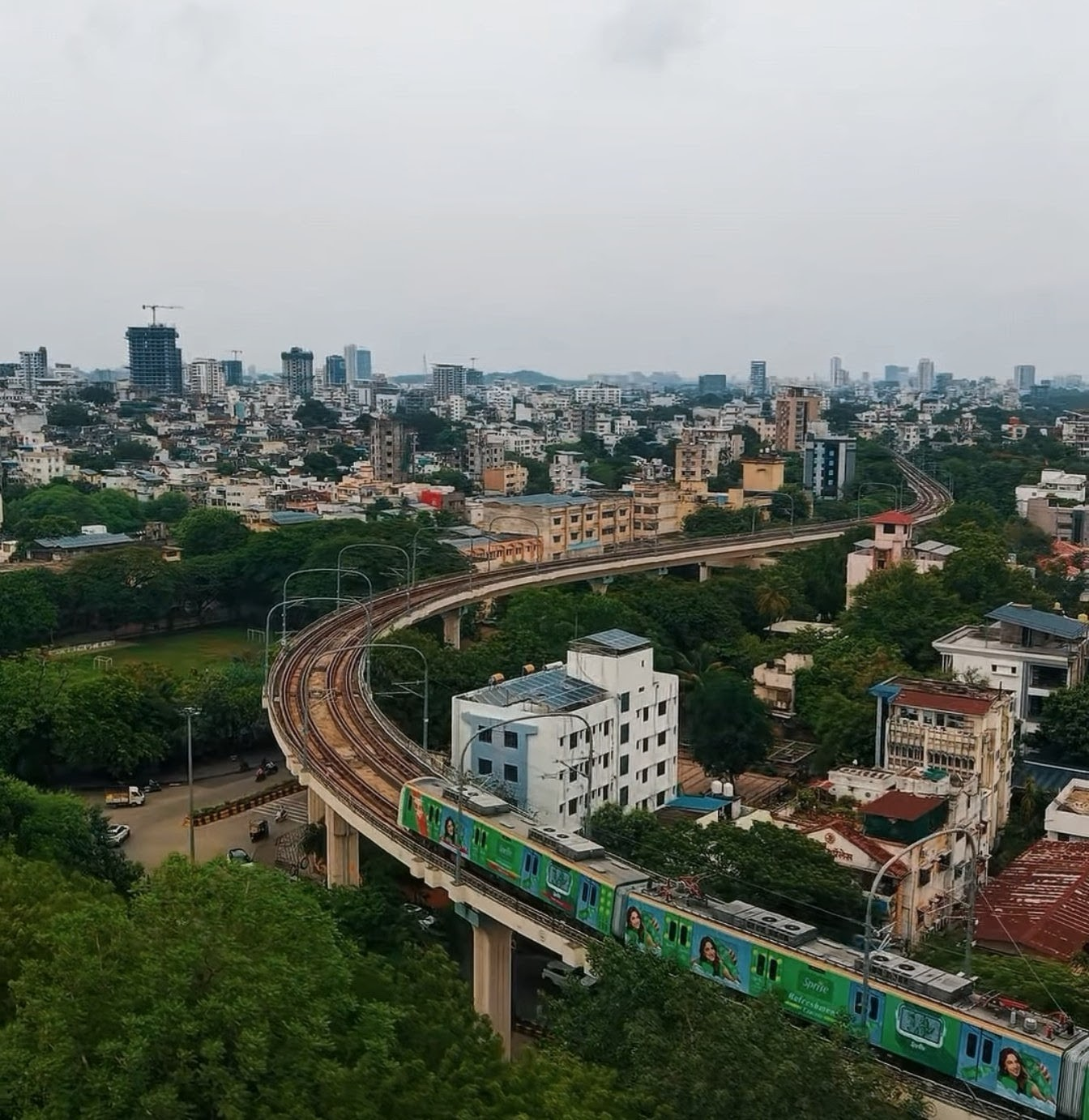
- Deekshabhoomi VNIT Nagpur Zero mile stone, the geographical center of India. Vidhan Bhavan, Nagpur General Post Office Dragon Palace Temple Nagpur Metro Nagpur Skyline
- Nicknames: Orange city The heart of India; Tiger capital of India; Tiger gateway of India
- Interactive map of Nagpur
- Location within Maharashtra Location within India
- Coordinates: 21.1498°N 79.0806°E
- Country: India
- State: Maharashtra
- Region: Vidarbha
- District: Nagpur
- Founded: 1702
- Founder: Bakht Buland Shah
- Named for: Nag River

Government
  - Type: Municipal corporation
  - Body: Nagpur Municipal Corporation; Nagpur Metropolitan Region Development Authority; Nagpur Improvement Trust
  - MP: Nitin Gadkari (BJP)
  - Mayor: Neeta Thakre (BJP)
  - Municipal Commissioner: Vipin Itankar (IAS)
  - Police Commissioner: Vishwas Nangare Patil (IPS)

Area
  - Nagpur Metro: 393.50 km^{2} (151.93 sq mi)
  - Nagpur City: 227.36 km^{2} (87.78 sq mi)
- Elevation: 310 m (1,020 ft)

Population (2011)
  - Nagpur Metro: 2,405,665
  - Estimate (2021): 3,127,000
  - Rank: India: 13th Maharashtra : 3rd Vidarbha: 1st
  - Density: 6,113.5/km^{2} (15,834/sq mi)
  - Metro: 2,497,870
  - Metro rank: 13th
- Demonym(s): Nagpurkar, Nagpurians
- Time zone: UTC+5:30 (IST)
- Pin code(s): 440 xxx
- Telephone code: +91-712
- Vehicle registration: MH-31 (Nagpur West); MH-49 (Nagpur East); MH-40 (Nagpur Rural)
- Nominal GDP (Nagpur district): ₹230,750 crore (US$24 billion) (2024-25)
- GDP Per Capita: ₹367,805 (US$3,800)
- Budget (Nagpur City): ₹6,202.99 crore (US$640 million)
- Sex ratio: 951 ♀ / 1000 ♂
- HDI: ▲0.786 (high)
- Official language: Marathi
- UN/LOCODE: IN NAG
- Literacy: 89.52%
- Airport: Dr. Babasaheb Ambedkar International Airport
- Rapid transit system: Nagpur Metro
- Website: www.nagpur.gov.in

Nagpur (Note: Marathi: Nāgapura, pronounced [nɐːɡᵊpʊɾᵊ]) is the largest and most populous city in central India. It is the second capital and the third-largest city of the Indian state Maharashtra. Also known as the "Orange City", Nagpur is the 13th largest city in India by population. Nagpur is the seat of the annual winter session of the Maharashtra state assembly, and is a major commercial and political centre of the Vidarbha region of Maharashtra. The regional branch of the Bombay High Court is also situated within the city.

The city was founded in 1702 by the Gond king Bakht Buland Shah of Deogarh and later became a part of the Maratha Empire under the Bhonsle dynasty. The British East India Company took over Nagpur in the 19th century and made it the capital of the Central Provinces and Berar. After the first re-organisation of states, the city lost its status as the capital. Following the informal Nagpur Pact between political leaders, it was made the second capital of Maharashtra.

Nagpur is famous for Nagpur oranges and is sometimes known as the Orange City for being a major trade centre of oranges cultivated in a large part of the region. It has been called the Tiger Capital of India or the Tiger Gateway of India as many tiger reserves are located in and around the city and also hosts the regional office of National Tiger Conservation Authority. The city derives unique importance from being a key location for the Dalit Buddhist movement and the headquarters for the right-wing Hindu-nationalist organisation Rashtriya Swayamsevak Sangh (RSS). Nagpur is also known for the Deekshabhoomi, which is graded an A-class tourism and pilgrimage site, the largest hollow stupa out of all of the Buddhist stupas in the world.

According to an Oxford's Economics report, Nagpur is projected to be the fifth fastest growing city in the world from 2019 to 2035 with an average growth of 8.41%. It has been proposed as one of the Smart Cities in Maharashtra and is one of the top ten cities in India in Smart City Project execution. In a survey by ABP News-Ipsos, Nagpur was identified as the best city in India topping in livability, greenery, public transport, and Health Care indices in 2013. The city was adjudged the 20th cleanest city in India and the top mover in the western zone as per Swachh Sarvekshan 2016. It was awarded as the best city for innovation and best practice in Swachh Sarvekshan 2018. It was also declared as open defecation free in January 2018 under Swachh Bharat Mission. In addition, it is one of the safest cities for women in India. Furthermore, the city ranked 25th in Ease of Living index 2020 among 111 cities in India. It was also ranked the 8th most competitive city in the country by the Institute for Competitiveness for the year 2017.

== Etymology ==
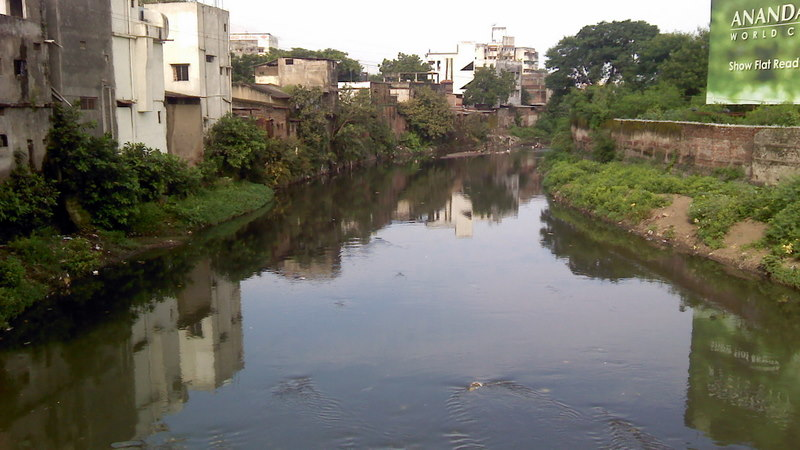
Nag River

Nagpur is named after the Nag River which flows through the city. The old Nagpur city (today called 'Mahal') is situated on north banks of the river Nag. Pur means "city" in many Indian languages.

== History ==
One of the earlier names of Nagpur was "Fanindrapura". It derives its origin from the Marathi word phaṇa (transl. hood of a cobra). Nagpur's first newspaper was named Fanindramani, which means a jewel that is believed to be suspended over a cobra's hood. It is this jewel that lights up the darkness, hence the name of the newspaper. B. R. Ambedkar claimed that both the city and the river are named after the 'Nags' who were opponents of the Indo-Aryans. During British rule, the name of the city was spelt and pronounced as "Nagpore".

=== Early and medieval history ===
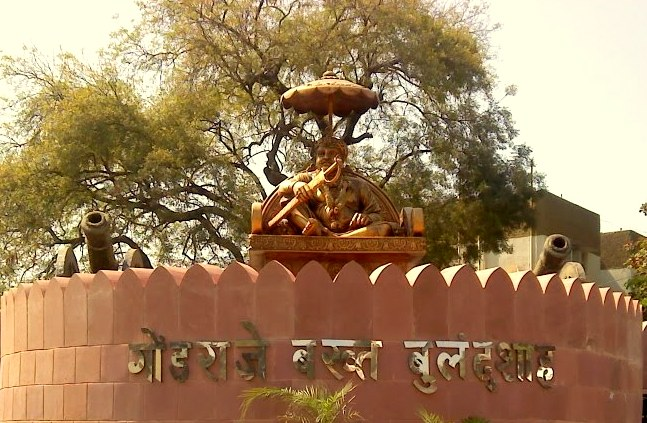
Statue of Bakht Buland Shah in Nagpur

Human existence around present-day Nagpur can be traced back 3000 years to the 8th century BCE. Mehir burial sites at the Drugdhamna (near the Mhada colony) indicate that the megalithic culture existed around Nagpur and is still followed. The first reference to the name "Nagpur" is found in a 10th-century copper-plate inscription discovered at Devali in the neighbouring Wardha District. The inscription is a record of the grant of a village situated in the Visaya (district) of Nagpura-Nandivardhana during the time of the Rastrakuta king Krsna III in the Saka year 862 (940 CE).

Towards the end of the 3rd century, King Vindhyasakti is known to have ruled the Nagpur region. In the 4th century, the Vakataka Dynasty ruled over the Nagpur region and surrounding areas and had good relations with the Gupta Empire. The Vakataka king Prithvisena I moved his capital to Nagardhan (ancient name Nandivardhana), 38 km (24 mi) from Nagpur. After the Vakatakas, the region came under the rule of the Hindu kingdoms of the Badami Chalukyas, the Rashtrakutas. The Paramaras or Panwars of Malwa appear to have controlled the Nagpur region in the 11th century. A prashasti inscription of the Paramara king Lakshmadeva (r. c. 1086–1094) was found at Nagpur. Subsequently, the region came under the Yadavas of Devagiri. In 1296, Allauddin Khilji invaded the Yadava Kingdom after capturing Deogiri, after which the Tughlaq Dynasty came to power in 1317.

In the 17th century, the Mughal Empire conquered the region, however during Mughal era, regional administration was carried out by the Gond kingdom of Deogarh in the Chhindwara district of the modern-day state of Madhya Pradesh. In the 18th century, Bhonsles of the Maratha Empire established the Nagpur kingdom based in the city.

=== Modern history ===
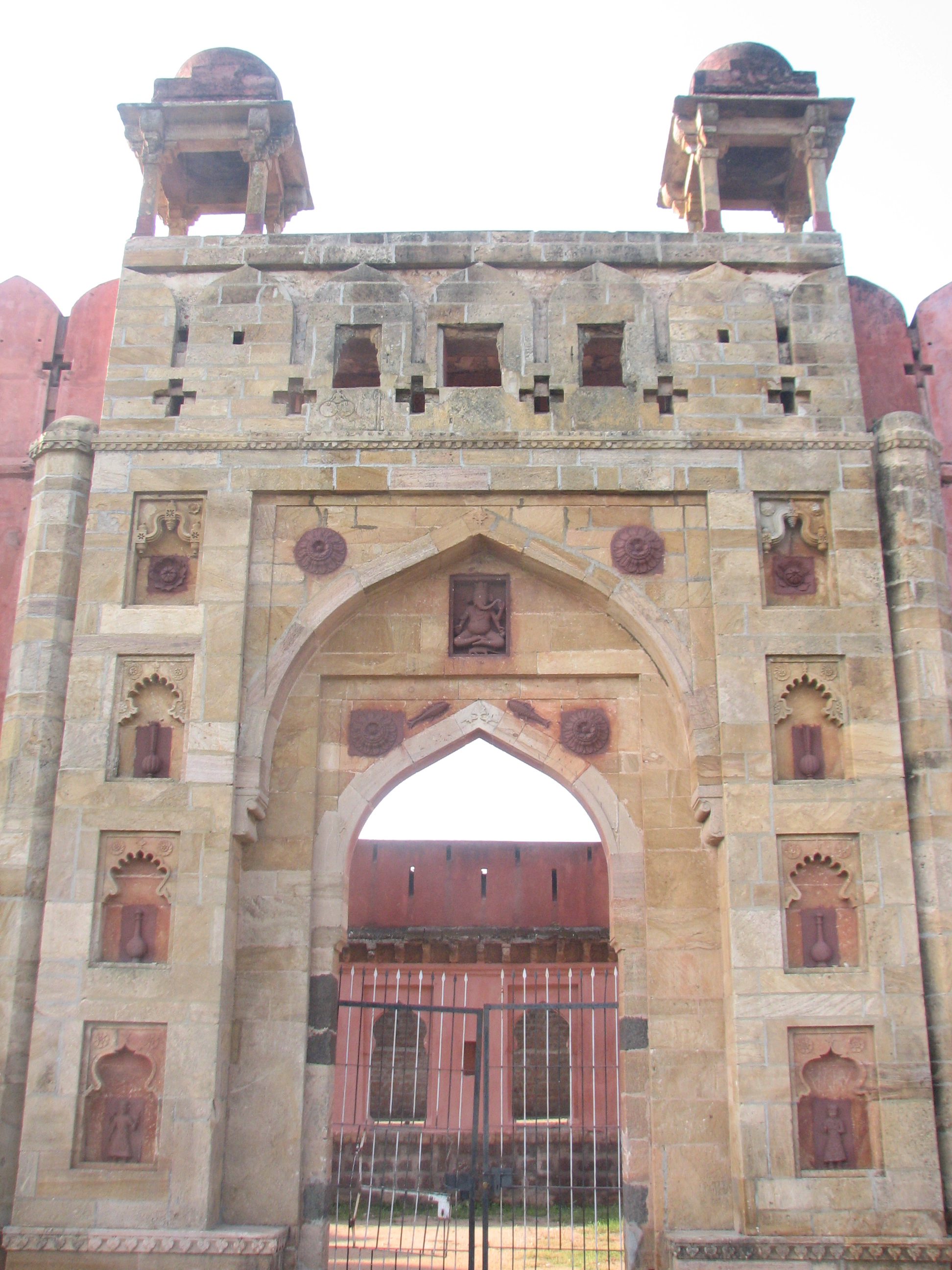
Main entrance of the Nagardhan Fort, commissioned by Raghuji Bhonsle of the Bhonsale dynasty of the Maratha Empire in the 18th century

The Gond king Bakht Buland Shah founded the city of Nagpur in 1702 by joining the twelve small villages formerly known as Rajapur Barsa or Barasta. An able administrator, he incentivised large-scale immigration of Marathi Hindu cultivators to increase economic activity. After Bhakt Buland Shah, the next Raja of Deogarh was Chand Sultan, who resided principally in the country below the hills, fixing his capital at Nagpur, which he turned into a walled town. On Chand Sultan's death in 1739, Wali Shah, an illegitimate son of Bakht Buland, usurped the throne and Chand Sultan's widow invoked the aid of the Maratha leader Raghoji Bhosale of Berar in the interest of her sons Akbar Shah and Burhan Shah. The usurper was put to death and the rightful heirs were placed on the throne. After 1743, a series of Maratha rulers came to power, starting with Raghoji Bhosale, who conquered the territories of Deogarh, Chanda and Chhattisgarh by 1751.

Nagpur was burnt substantially in 1765 and again partially in 1811 by marauding Pindaris. However, the development of the city of Nagpur continued. In 1803 Raghoji II Bhosale joined the Peshwa against the British in the Second Anglo-Maratha War, but the British prevailed. After Raghoji II's death in 1816, his son Parsaji was deposed and murdered by Mudhoji II Bhosale. Despite the fact that he had entered into a treaty with the British in the same year, Mudhoji joined the Peshwa in the Third Anglo-Maratha War in 1817 against the British but suffered a defeat at Sitabuldi in present-day Nagpur. The fierce battle was a turning point as it laid the foundations of the downfall of the Bhosales and paved the way for the British acquisition of Nagpur city. Mudhoji was deposed after a temporary restoration to the throne, after which the British placed Raghoji III Bhosale, the grandchild of Raghoji II, on the throne. During the rule of Raghoji III (which lasted until 1840), the region was administered by a British resident. In 1853, the British took control of Nagpur after Raghoji III died without leaving an heir.

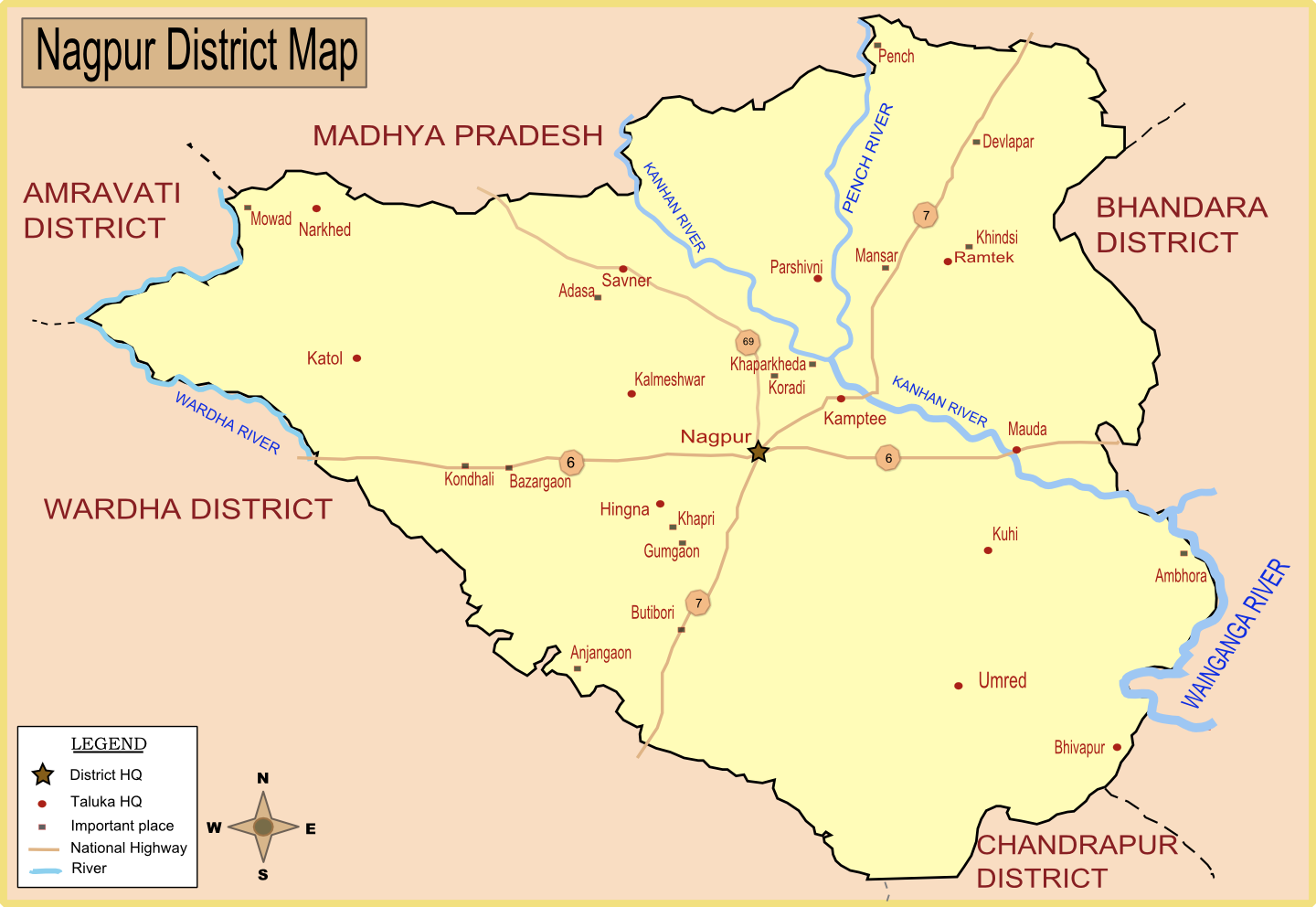
Map of Nagpur district with major towns and rivers

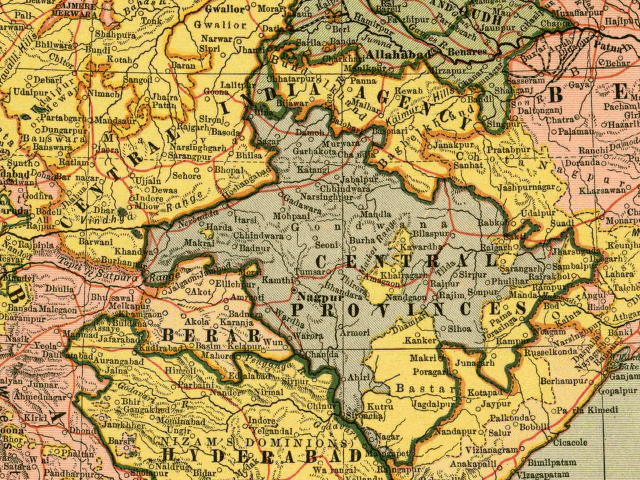
Central Provinces and Berar, 1903. Princely states are shown in yellow.

From 1853 to 1861, the Nagpur Province (which consisted of the present Nagpur region, Chhindwara, and Chhattisgarh) became part of the Central Provinces and Berar and came under the administration of a commissioner under the British central government, with Nagpur as its capital. Berar was added in 1903. The advent of the Great Indian Peninsula Railway (GIP) in 1867 spurred its development as a trade centre. Tata group started its first textile mill at Nagpur, formally known as Central India Spinning and Weaving Company Ltd. The company was popularly known as "Empress Mills" as it was inaugurated on 1 January 1877, the day queen Victoria was proclaimed Empress of India.

The non-co-operation movement was launched in the Nagpur session of 1920. The city witnessed a Hindu–Muslim riot in 1923 which had profound impact on K. B. Hedgewar, who in 1925 founded the Rashtriya Swayamsevak Sangh (RSS), a public serves organisation in Mohitewada Mahal, Nagpur with an idea of creating a Hindu Rashtra. After the 1927 Nagpur riots RSS gained further popularity in Nagpur and the organisation grew nationwide.

=== After Indian independence ===
After India gained independence in 1947, Central Provinces and Berar became a province of India. In 1950, the Central Provinces and Berar was reorganised as the Indian state of Madhya Pradesh, with Nagpur as its capital. When the Indian states were reorganised along linguistic lines in 1956, Nagpur and Berar regions were transferred to the state of Bombay, which was split into the states of Maharashtra and Gujarat in 1960. At a formal public ceremony held on 14 October 1956 in Nagpur, B. R. Ambedkar and his supporters converted to Buddhism, which started the Dalit Buddhist movement that is still active. In 1994, the city of Nagpur witnessed its most violent day in modern times: in the Gowari stampede, police fired on Gowari protestors demanding Scheduled Tribe status and caused a mass panic.

Nagpur completed 300 years of establishment in the year 2002. A big celebration was organised to mark the event.

== Geography ==
=== Topography ===
Nagpur is located at the exact centre of the Indian subcontinent, close to the geometric centre of the quadrilateral connecting the four major metros of India, viz. Chennai, Mumbai, New Delhi and Kolkata. The city has the Zero Mile Stone locating the geographical centre of India, which was used by the British to measure all distances within the Indian subcontinent. The city lies on the Deccan Plateau of the Indian subcontinent and has a mean altitude of 310.5 meters above sea level. The underlying rock strata are covered with alluvial deposits resulting from the flood plain of the Kanhan River. In some places, these give rise to granular, sandy soil. In low-lying areas, which are poorly drained, the soil is alluvial clay with poor permeability characteristics. In the eastern part of the city, crystalline metamorphic rocks such as gneiss, schist and granites are found, while in the northern part, yellowish sandstones and clays of the lower Gondwana formations are found. Nagpur city is dotted with natural and artificial lakes. The largest lake is Ambazari Lake. Other natural lakes include Gorewada Lake and Telankhedi lake. Sonegaon and Gandhisagar Lakes are artificial, created by the city's historical rulers. Nag river, Pilli Nadi, and nallas form the natural drainage pattern for the city. Nagpur is known for its greenery and was adjudged the cleanest and second greenest in India after Chandigarh in 2010.

=== Climate ===
Nagpur has tropical wet and dry climate (Aw in Köppen climate classification) with dry conditions prevailing for most of the year. It receives about 163 mm of rainfall in June. The amount of rainfall is increased in July to 294 mm. Gradual decrease of rainfall has been observed from July to August (278 mm) and September (160 mm). The highest recorded daily rainfall was 304 mm on 14 July 1994. Summers are extremely hot, lasting from March to June, with May being the hottest month. Winter lasts from November to February, during which temperatures occasionally drop to 10 °C (50 °F). The highest recorded temperature in the city was 47 °C on 30 May 2024, while the lowest was 3.1 °C on 29 December 2018.

==== Extreme weather ====
The average number of heat wave days occurring in Nagpur in the summer months of March, April and May is 0.5, 2.4 and 7.2 days, respectively. May is the most uncomfortable and hottest month with, for example, 20 days of heat waves being experienced in 1973, 1988 and 2010. The summer season is characterised by other severe weather activity like thunderstorms, dust storms, hailstorms and squalls. Generally, hailstorms occur during March and dust storms during March and April. These occur infrequently (1 per 10 days). Squalls occur more frequently, with 0.3 per day in March and April rising to 0.8 per day in May. Due to the heat waves in the city the Indian Government with the help of New York-based National Resources Defense Council has launched a heat wave program since March 2016.

Climate data for Nagpur (1991–2020, extremes 1901–2020)
Month	Jan	Feb	Mar	Apr	May	Jun	Jul	Aug	Sep	Oct	Nov	Dec	Year
Record high °C (°F)	36.6 (97.9)	39.2 (102.6)	45.0 (113.0)	47.1 (116.8)	47.9 (118.2)	47.7 (117.9)	40.6 (105.1)	37.8 (100.0)	38.9 (102.0)	39.5 (103.1)	35.6 (96.1)	39.7 (103.5)	47.9 (118.2)
Mean daily maximum °C (°F)	28.9 (84.0)	31.9 (89.4)	36.4 (97.5)	40.6 (105.1)	43.1 (109.6)	38.1 (100.6)	31.9 (89.4)	30.8 (87.4)	32.4 (90.3)	33.2 (91.8)	31.3 (88.3)	29.3 (84.7)	34.0 (93.2)
Daily mean °C (°F)	20.8 (69.4)	23.9 (75.0)	28.1 (82.6)	32.3 (90.1)	35.5 (95.9)	32.1 (89.8)	28.1 (82.6)	27.3 (81.1)	27.8 (82.0)	26.7 (80.1)	23.6 (74.5)	20.9 (69.6)	27.3 (81.1)
Mean daily minimum °C (°F)	14.1 (57.4)	16.0 (60.8)	19.7 (67.5)	25.1 (77.2)	28.1 (82.6)	26.6 (79.9)	24.4 (75.9)	23.5 (74.3)	23.4 (74.1)	21.4 (70.5)	17.1 (62.8)	13.2 (55.8)	21.1 (69.9)
Record low °C (°F)	3.9 (39.0)	5.0 (41.0)	8.3 (46.9)	13.9 (57.0)	19.4 (66.9)	20.0 (68.0)	19.4 (66.9)	18.3 (64.9)	16.6 (61.9)	11.6 (52.9)	6.7 (44.1)	3.5 (38.3)	3.5 (38.3)
Average rainfall mm (inches)	14.9 (0.59)	13.1 (0.52)	20.4 (0.80)	12.5 (0.49)	19.1 (0.75)	190.6 (7.50)	347.7 (13.69)	277.2 (10.91)	183.7 (7.23)	53.3 (2.10)	13.1 (0.52)	5.5 (0.22)	1,151.2 (45.32)
Average rainy days	1.0	1.1	1.8	1.4	1.7	8.9	14.7	13.5	9.1	2.9	0.9	0.2	57.1
Average relative humidity (%) (at 17:30 IST)	43	34	27	23	24	50	75	78	73	63	56	49	50
Mean monthly sunshine hours	263.5	265.6	291.4	282.0	294.5	186.0	114.7	111.6	177.0	257.3	255.0	260.4	2,759
Mean daily sunshine hours	8.5	9.4	9.4	9.4	9.5	6.2	3.7	3.6	5.9	8.3	8.5	8.4	7.6
Average ultraviolet index	7	9	12	12	12	12	12	12	12	10	8	7	10
Source 1: India Meteorological Department (sun 1971–2000)
Source 2: Tokyo Climate Center (mean temperatures 1991–2020) Weather Atlas

Nagpur has been ranked 15th best “National Clean Air City” (under Category 1 >10L Population cities) in India according to 'Swachh Vayu Survekshan 2024 Results'

== Demographics ==
=== Population ===
Historical population
Year	Pop.	±%
1981	1,219,500	—
1991	1,664,000	+36.4%
2001	2,052,066	+23.3%
2011	2,405,665	+17.2%
Source: Census of India

As of the 2011 census, Nagpur municipality has a population of 2,405,665. The total population constitute, 1,225,405 males and 1,180,270 females. The total children (ages 0–6) are 247,078, of whom 128,290 are boys and 118,788 are girls. Children form 10.27% of total population of Nagpur. The total number of slums number 179,952, in which 859,487 people reside. This is around 35.73% of the total population of Nagpur. The municipality has a sex ratio of 963 females per 1,000 males and child sex ratio of 926 girls per 1,000 boys. 1,984,123 people are literate, of whom 1,036,097 are male and 948,026 are female. Average literacy rate of Nagpur city are 91.92%. Men are 94.44% and women are 89.31% literate.

Year	Male	Female	Total Population	Change
2001	1059765	992301	2052066	-
2011	1225405	1180260	2405665	17.231

=== Religion ===
Religion in Nagpur City (2011)
Religion	Percent
Hinduism	69.46%
Buddhism	15.57%
Islam	11.95%
Others	1.88%
Christianity	1.15%

Hinduism is the majority religion in Nagpur city with 69.46% followers. Buddhism is the second most popular religion in Nagpur city with 15.57% following it. Nagpur is known for the Buddhist site of Deekshabhoomi. In Nagpur city, Islam is followed by 11.95%, Christianity by 1.15%, Jainism by 0.90% and Sikhism by 0.68%. Around 0.10% stated 'Other Religion' and approximately 0.20% stated 'No Particular Religion'.

=== Language ===
Languages in Nagpur (2011)
1. Marathi (60.6%)
2. Hindi (22.7%)
3. Urdu (6.36%)
4. Chhattisgarhi (2.29%)
5. Sindhi (1.79%)
6. Gujarati (1.16%)
7. Punjabi (0.91%)
8. Others (4.12%)

Marathi is the most-spoken language, spoken by 60.63% of the population. Hindi and Urdu are the second and third largest languages, spoken by 22.74% and 6.36% of the population respectively. Other languages spoken in Nagpur include Chhattisgarhi (2.29%), Sindhi (1.79%), Gujarati (1.16%) and Punjabi (0.91%). There are also small numbers of Telugu, Bengali and Gondi speakers in the city.

== Administration ==
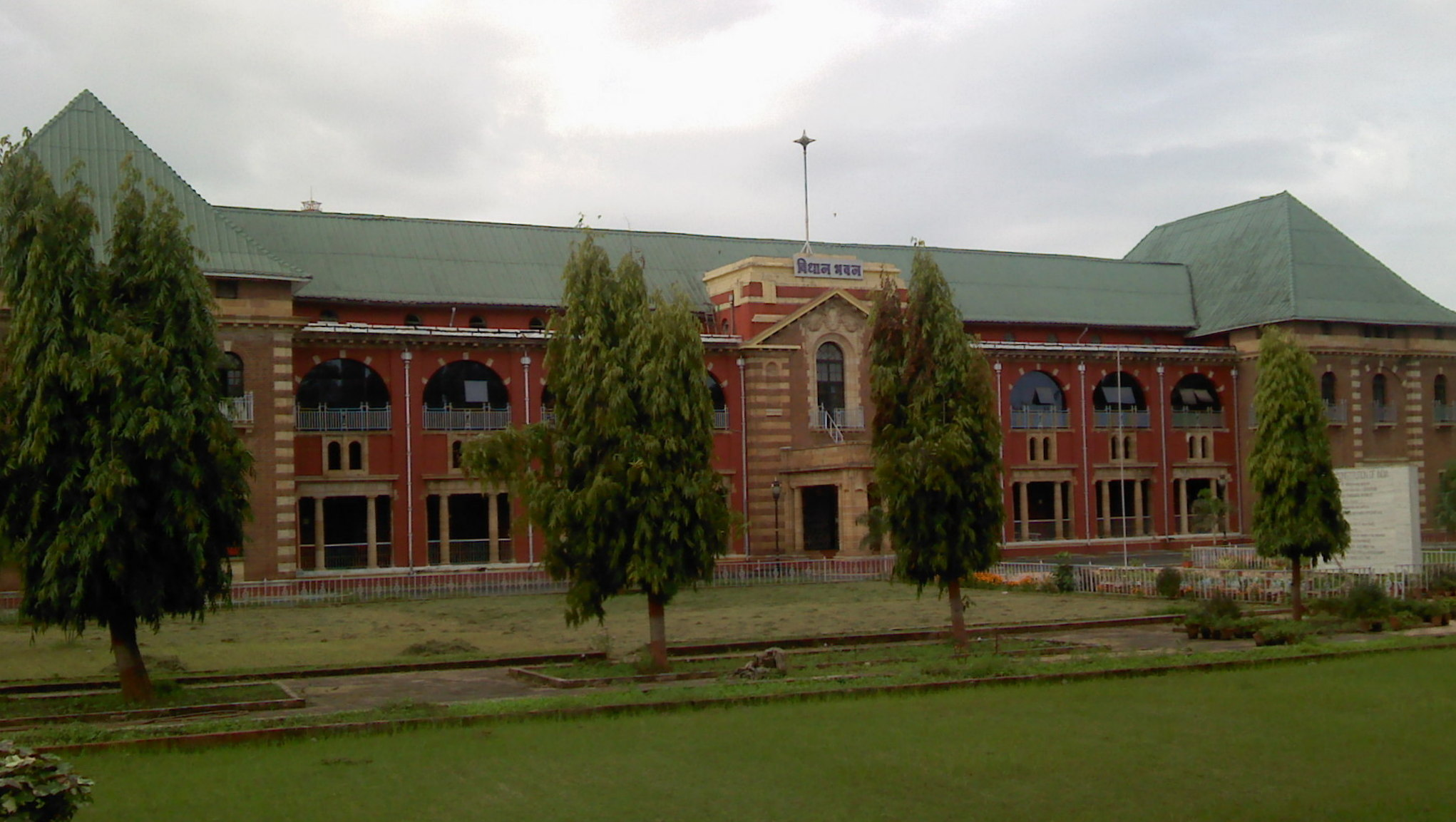
Vidhan Bhavan (State Legislative Assembly) Nagpur

Nagpur was the capital of Central Provinces and Berar for 100 years. After the State Reorganisation in 1956, Nagpur and Vidarbha region become part of the new Maharashtra State. With this Nagpur lost the capital status and hence a pact was signed between leaders, the Nagpur Pact. According to the pact, one session of state legislature and the state legislative council takes place in Vidhan Bhavan, Nagpur. Usually the winter session takes place in the city exception being in 1966, 1971 and 2018 when the monsoon session took place in the city. Nagpur has a district court and its own bench of the Bombay High Court which was established on 9 January 1936. The city consists of six Vidhan Sabha constituencies namely Nagpur West, Nagpur South, Nagpur South West, Nagpur East, Nagpur North and Nagpur Central. These constituencies are part of the Nagpur Lok Sabha constituency.

=== Local government ===
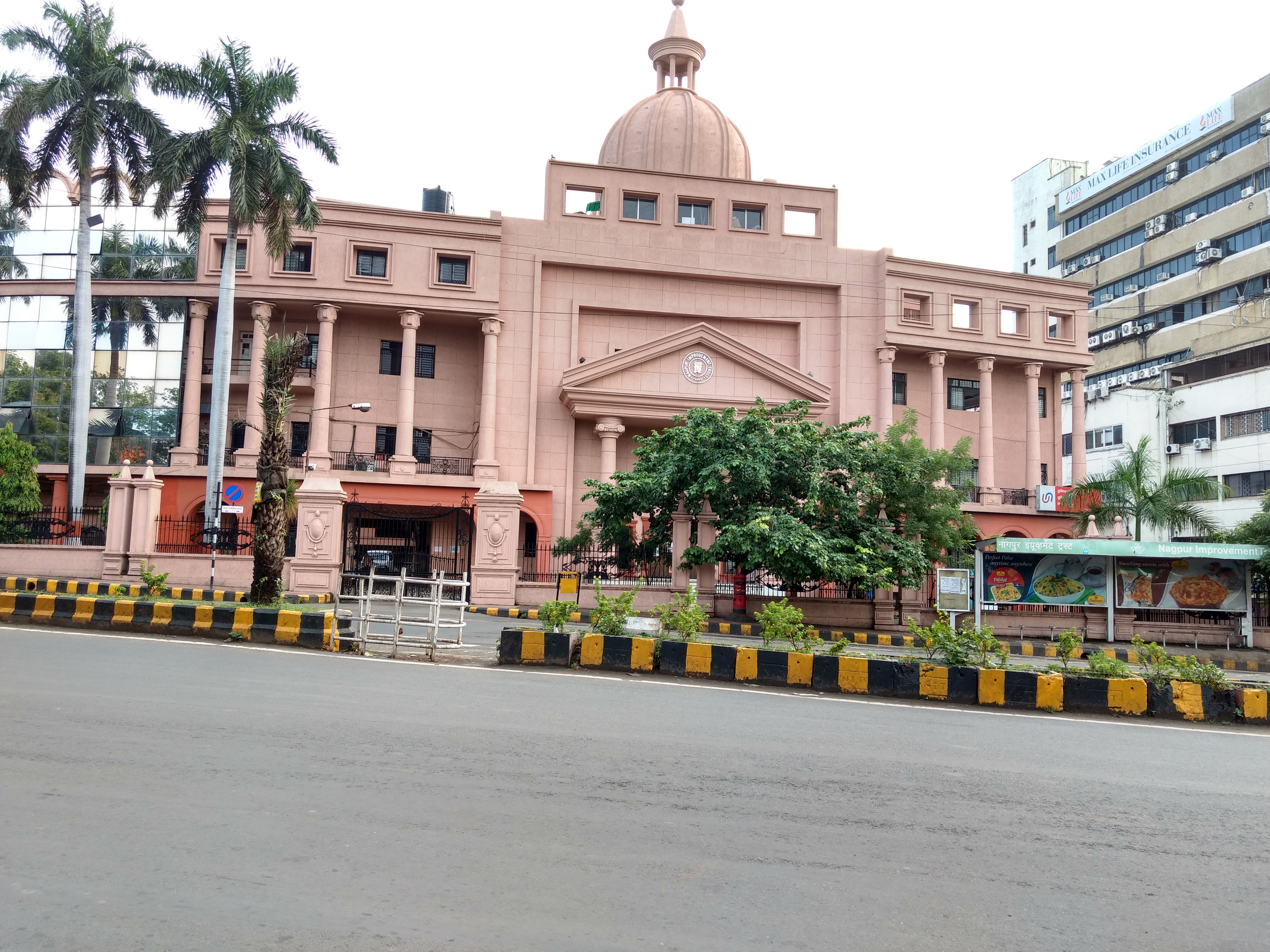
NIT- Nagpur Improvement Trust

The Municipal Council for Nagpur was established in 1864. At that time, the area under the jurisdiction of the Nagpur Municipal Council was 15.5 km^{2} and the population was 82,000. The duties entrusted to the Nagpur Municipal Council were to maintain cleanliness and arrange for street lights and water supply with government assistance. The Municipal Corporation came into existence in March 1951. Nagpur is administered by the Nagpur Municipal Corporation (NMC), which is a democratically elected civic governing body. The Corporation elects a Mayor who along with a Deputy Mayor heads the organisation. The mayor carries out the activities through various committees such as the Standing Committee, health and sanitation committee, education committee, water works, public works, public health and market committee. The administrative head of the corporation is the Municipal Commissioner, an Indian Administrative Service (IAS) officer appointed by the state government. The Municipal Commissioner along with the Deputy Municipal Commissioners, carry out various activities related to engineering, health and sanitation, taxation and its recovery. Various departments such as public relations, library, health, finance, buildings, slums, roads, street lighting, traffic, establishment, gardens, public works, local audit, legal services, waterworks, education, octroi and fire services manage their specific activities. The activities of NMC are administered by its zonal offices. There are 10 zonal offices in Nagpur – Laxmi Nagar, Dharampeth, Hanuman Nagar, Dhantoli, Nehru Nagar, Gandhi Baugh, Sataranjipura, Lakkadganj, Ashi Nagar and Mangalwari. These zones are divided into 145 wards. Each ward is represented by a corporator, a majority of whom are elected in local elections. NMC has various departments including healthcare, education, and a fire brigade dedicated for each service and project of the city.

According to financial data published on the CityFinance Portal of the Ministry of Housing and Urban Affairs, the Nagpur Municipal Corporation reported total revenue receipts of ₹2,551 crore (US$307 million) and total expenditure of ₹2,267 crore (US$273 million) in 2022–23. Tax revenue accounted for about 9.0% of the total revenue, while the corporation received ₹1,677 crore in grants during the financial year.

Nagpur Improvement Trust (NIT) is a local planning authority which works with the NMC and carries out the development of the civic infrastructure and new urban areas on its behalf. NIT is headed by a chairman, an Indian Administrative Service Officer appointed by the state government. Since the 1990s the urban agglomeration had rapidly expanded beyond the city's municipal boundaries. This growth had presented challenges for the future growth of the city and its fringes in an organised manner. With a view of achieving balanced development within the region, the Nagpur Improvement Trust (NIT) was notified as the Special Planning Authority (SPA) for the Nagpur Metropolitan Area (NMA) and entrusted with the preparation of a Statutory Development Plan as per provisions of the MRTP Act, 1966. The notified NMA comprises areas outside the Nagpur city and includes 721 villages under 9 tehsils of the Nagpur District spreading across an area of 3,567 km^{2}. In 1999, the government of Maharashtra declared that the Nagpur Metropolitan Area shall comprise all of Nagpur city, Nagpur Gramin (rural areas near Nagpur), Hingna, Parseoni, Mauda and Kamptee Taluka and parts of Savner, Kalmeshwar, Umred and Kuhi. The boundaries of the "Metro region" around the municipal corporation limits of the city have been defined as per the notification. In 2002, the government extended the jurisdiction of the Nagpur Improvement Trust (NIT) by 25 to 40 kilometres. This new area was defined under clause 1(2) of NIT Act-1936 as "Nagpur Metropolitan Area". Maharashtra State Cabinet in 2016 had paved the way for NIT to become Nagpur Metropolitan Region Development Authority (NMRDA) NMRDA was notified by the Government of Maharashtra in March 2017. NMRDA has been made on the lines of Mumbai Metropolitan Region Development Authority. NMRDA has been mandated to monitor development in the metropolis comprising 721 villages across nine tehsils in the district. The body is headed by Metropolitan Commissioner, an Indian Administrative Service Officer appointed by the state government as was with the NIT chairman. Currently, NIT is the planning authority for developing projects around the city in land owned by it.

The Maharashtra government had appointed Larsen & Toubro (L&T) as the implementation partner to convert Nagpur into the country's first large scale, integrated, smart city. The state government had also decided to develop the city complete with five hubs, from textile centres to defence sector. Nagpur was selected from Maharashtra among other cities under Government of India's Smart Cities Mission. City was selected in the third round of selection. For the implementation of the projects under Smart Cities Mission a special purpose vehicle was formed which was named Nagpur Smart and Sustainable City Development Corporation Ltd.

Nagpur Police is headed by a Police Commissioner who is of the rank of Additional Director General of Police of Maharashtra Police. Nagpur Police is divided into 5 Zones, each headed by a Deputy Commissioner of Police, while traffic zones are divided into eleven zones each headed by an inspector. The State C.I.D Regional Headquarter, State Reserve Police Force and Regional Police Training School are situated at Nagpur.

=== Utility services ===
Originally, all the utility services of the city were carried out by NMC departments, but from 2008 onwards privatisation had started for major utility services. The Orange City Water Private Limited (OCW), a joint venture of Veolia Water India Pvt. Ltd and Vishwaraj Infrastructure Ltd., manages the water supply for the city as well as Nagpur Municipal Corporation's water treatment plants at Gorewada, all the elevated service reservoirs, ground service reservoirs, master balancing reservoirs commonly known as water tanks. This joint venture was established in November 2011 and was awarded the contract to execute 24x7 water supply project and operational and maintenance of waterworks for 25 years. Kanak Resources Management Ltd. was awarded the contract for garbage collection in the city as per Nagpur Bin Free Project in 2009 by NMC. It was replaced by AG Enviro Infra Project Pvt Ltd and BVG India in 2019. In electricity supply, which was first managed by MSEB was then replaced by MSEDCL. Nagpur Fire Brigade has nine fire stations at various locations in the city. India Post which is a governmental postal department has two head post offices and many post offices including sub-post offices at various locations in the city and are part of the logistics services in the city along with various other private operators.

=== Health care ===
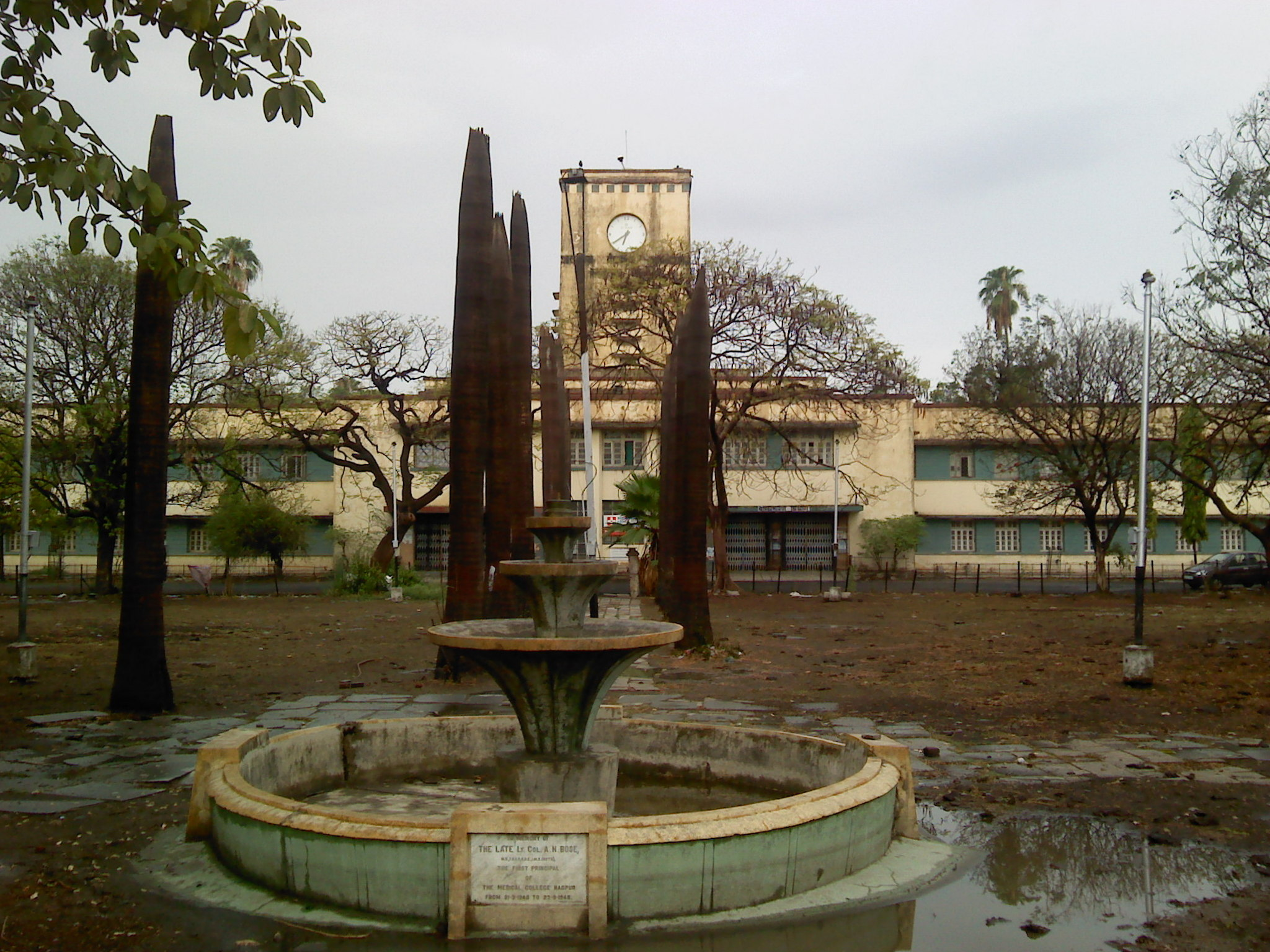
Government Medical College and Hospital, Nagpur

NMC in collaboration with Central Government, State Government, UNICEF, World Health Organization and Non-governmental organisation conducts and maintains various health schemes in the city. City health line is an initiative started by NMC dedicated to the health of citizens of Nagpur. This includes providing computerised comparative information and action in the field to local citizens. NMC runs three indoor patient hospitals including Indira Gandhi Rugnalaya at LAD square, Panchpaoli Maternity Hospital in Panchpaoli and Isolation Hospital in Immamwada. Besides, the civic body runs three big diagnostic centres at Mahal, Sadar and also at Indira Gandhi Rugnalaya. Apart from these, NMC has 57 outpatient dispensaries (OPDs), including 23 health posts sanctioned under Union Government's schemes, 15 allopathy hospitals, 12 ayurvedic hospitals, three homoeopathy hospitals, three naturopathy hospitals and one Unani hospital. In 2013, ABP News-Ipsos declared Nagpur the country's best city for health care services. The city is home to numerous hospitals, some run by the government and some private and consists of various super-specialty and multi-specialty ones. Recently various cancer speciality hospitals providing treatment until tertiary care for cancer patients have been established in the city making it a natural medical hub for nearby areas and boosting healthcare system in the city. Nagpur is a health hub for Central India and caters to a large geographical area arbitrarily bounded by Delhi in the north, Kolkata in the east, Mumbai-Pune in the west and Hyderabad in the south. People from Madhya Pradesh, Chhattisgarh, Uttar Pradesh, Orissa, Andhra Pradesh and Telangana regularly come to Nagpur for their health needs. Nagpur boasts of super-specialty physicians and surgeons serving its population in both public sector government-run hospitals and well equipped private hospitals catering to all strata of society. AIIMS has also been established in MIHAN, Nagpur.

According to 2005 National Family Health Survey, Nagpur has a fertility rate of 1.9 which is below the replacement level. The infant mortality rate was 43 per 1,000 live births, and the mortality rate for children under five was 50 per 1,000 live births. About 57% slum and 72% non-slum children have received all the mandatory vaccines which include BCG, measles and full courses of polio and DPT. In Nagpur, 78 per cent of poor children are anaemic, including 49 per cent who have moderate to severe anaemia. About 45% of children under five years of age and 31% of women are underweight. The poor people from the city mostly cite the reason of the lack of a nearby facility, poor quality of care and excessive waiting time for not visiting any government hospitals for treatment. According to the National Family Health Survey (NFHS-4) of 2015-16 for Nagpur, households having improved drinking water source is 95.3%, households having improved sanitation facility is 77.3% and households having clean fuel for cooking is 87.6%. Health Insurance coverage among households in the city are 19.5%. Female sterilisation is more prominent than male sterilisation in Nagpur. Institutional births in the city is 97%. Children below 5 years who are anaemic are 43.50%, while women and men in the age group of 15 to 49 years who are anaemic are 45.00% and 21.20%, respectively.

The availability of MRI scanning has also increased in the city, with tertiary hospitals and accredited diagnostic centres offering imaging for neurological, spinal and whole-body evaluations as part of routine clinical care.

=== Military establishments ===
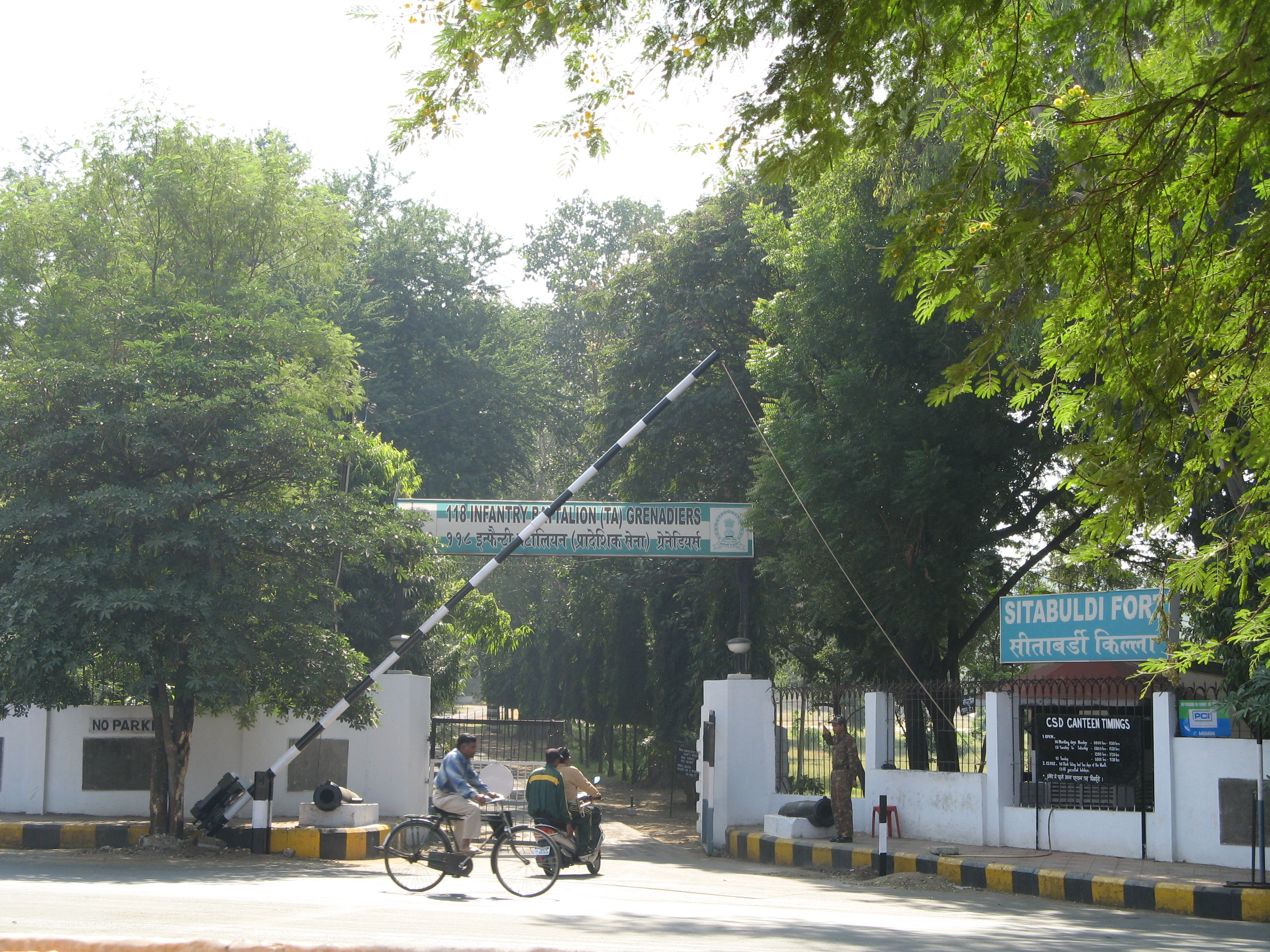
Sitabuldi fort is home to Indian Army's 118th infantry battalion.

Nagpur is an important city for the Indian armed forces. Maintenance Command of Indian Air Force has its current headquarters at Vayusena Nagar in Nagpur. It houses Mi-8 helicopters and the IAF carriers IL-76 and handles the maintenance, repair, and operations of all aircraft, helicopters and other equipment.

The ordnance factory and staff college of ordnance factory Ambazari and National Academy of Defence Production for Group A officer of ordnance factories are in the western part of the city. Sitabuldi Fort is managed by the Uttar Maharashtra and Gujarat sub area hq.of the Indian Army and citizens are allowed to visit the premises on Republic day, Maharashtra day and Independence day.

The 'raison d'être' for Kamptee, the military cantonment, is still operational. Kamptee Cantonment houses the Officers Training Academy for National Cadets Corps, which is the only one of its kind. It is also the regimental centre of one of the oldest and most respected regiments in the Indian Army, the Brigade of the Guards. Guards, located at Kamptee, are the only regiment in the Indian Army which have won two PVC (Param Veer Chakra), the highest gallantry awarded to soldiers for wartime operations. There are also other military establishments and a well equipped military hospital to care for the health of the armed forces personnel. The Army Postal Service centre is also operational in the cantonment since 1948, to provide training to personnel of Department of Post who volunteer themselves for the Army. Nagpur's National Civil Defence College provides civil defence and disaster management training to pupils from all over India and abroad. Indian Air Force's IL-76 transport planes nicknamed "Gajraj" are also based in Nagpur.

== Economy ==
Nagpur is an emerging metropolis. Nagpur's nominal GDP was estimated to be around ₹230,750 crore (US$24 billion) in 2024-25, making it the largest economic centre in entire central India. Nagpur district has a per-capita GDP of ₹367,805 (US$3,800) as of 2024-25 financial year, being the highest in the central India In 2004, it was ranked the fastest-growing city in India in terms of the number of households with an annual income of ₹10 million or more. Nagpur has been the main centre of commerce in the region of Vidarbha since its early days and is an important trading location. Although, Nagpur's economic importance gradually declined relative to Mumbai and Pune after the merging of Vidarbha into Maharashtra because of a period of neglect by the state government, the city's economy later recovered.

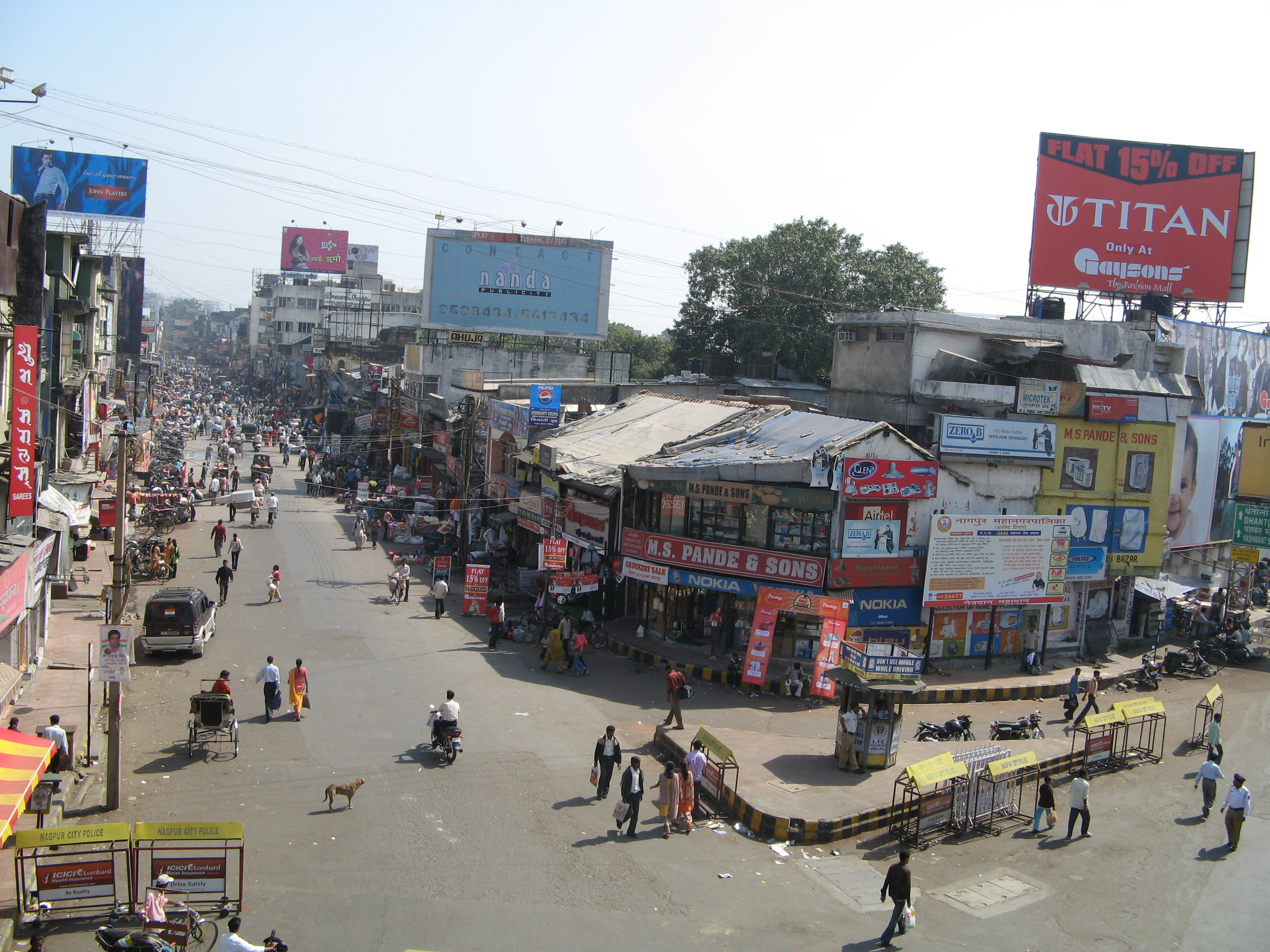
Sitabuldi Market, one of the busiest commercial areas of Nagpur

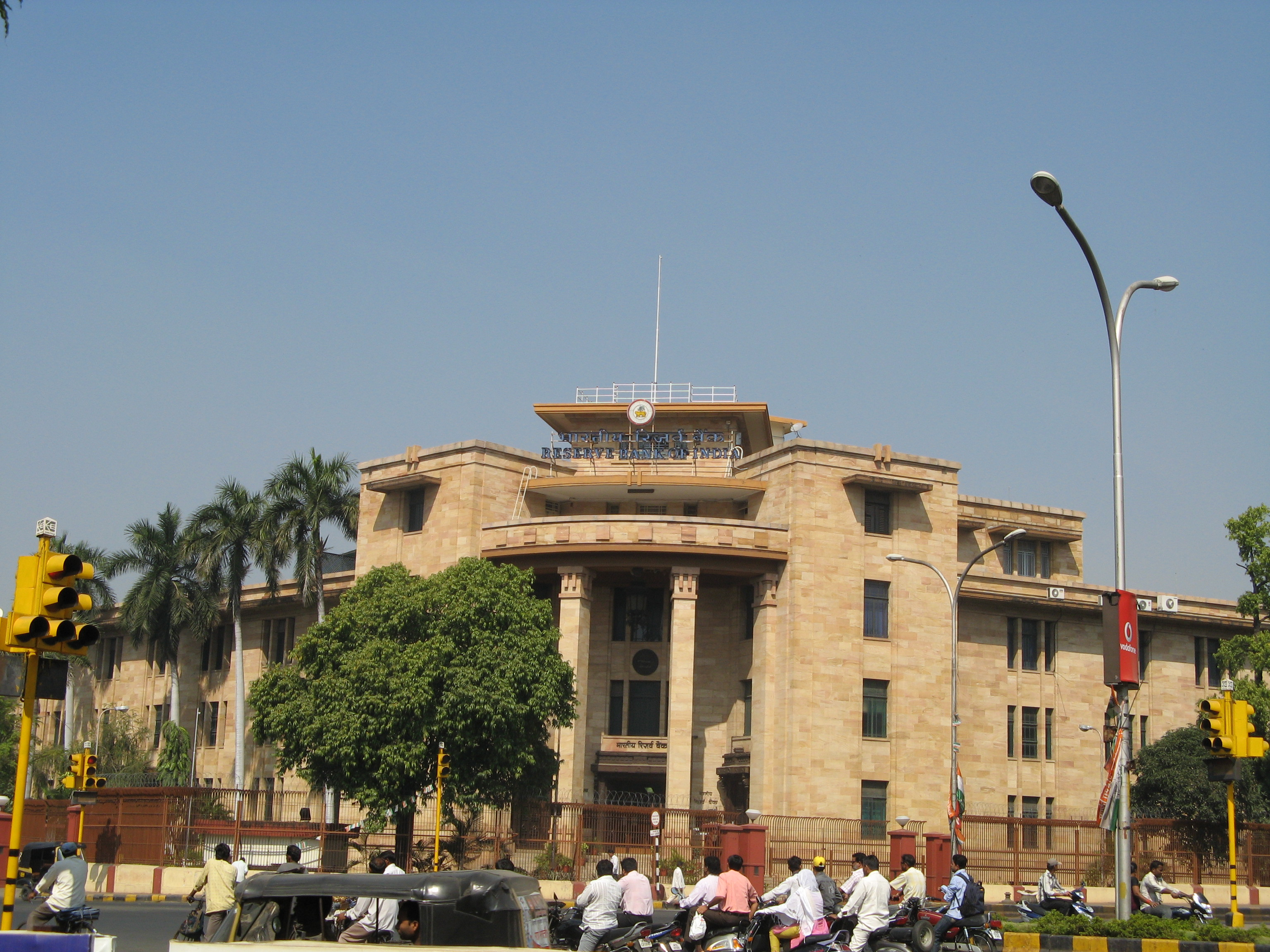
Nagpur branch of the Reserve Bank of India

The city is important for the banking sector as it hosts the regional office of Reserve Bank of India, which was opened on 10 September 1956. The Reserve Bank of India has two branches in Nagpur, one of which houses India's entire gold assets. Sitabuldi market in central Nagpur, known as the heart of the city, is the major commercial market area.

Nagpur is home to ice-cream manufacturer Dinshaws, Indian dry food manufacturer Haldiram's, Indian ready-to-cook food manufacturer Actchawa, spice manufacturer Suruchi International, Ayurvedic products company Vicco, Baidyanath, Vithoba, & Aroma, Water Tank & Pipe manufacturing company R C Plasto and Explosives & Ammunition company Solar Industries.

For centuries, Nagpur has been famous for its orange gardens in the country, hence the name "Orange City". Orange cultivation has been expanding and it is the biggest marketplace for oranges in the country. The Maharashtra Agro Industrial Development Corporation has its multi fruit processing division called Nagpur Orange Grower's Association (NOGA) which has an installed capacity of 4,950 MT of fruits per annum. Orange is also exported to various regions in the country as well to other countries. Nagpur is also famous for the cotton and silk which is woven by its large Koshti population of handloom weavers which are around 5,000.

Nagpur and the Vidarbha region have a very prominent power sector as compared to the rest of Maharashtra. Koradi Thermal Power Station and Khaparkheda Thermal Power Station are two major thermal power stations located near Nagpur and operated by MSPGCL. NTPC has a super thermal power plant called Mauda Super Thermal Power Station at Mauda around 40 km from Nagpur and Adani Power is situated at Butibori.

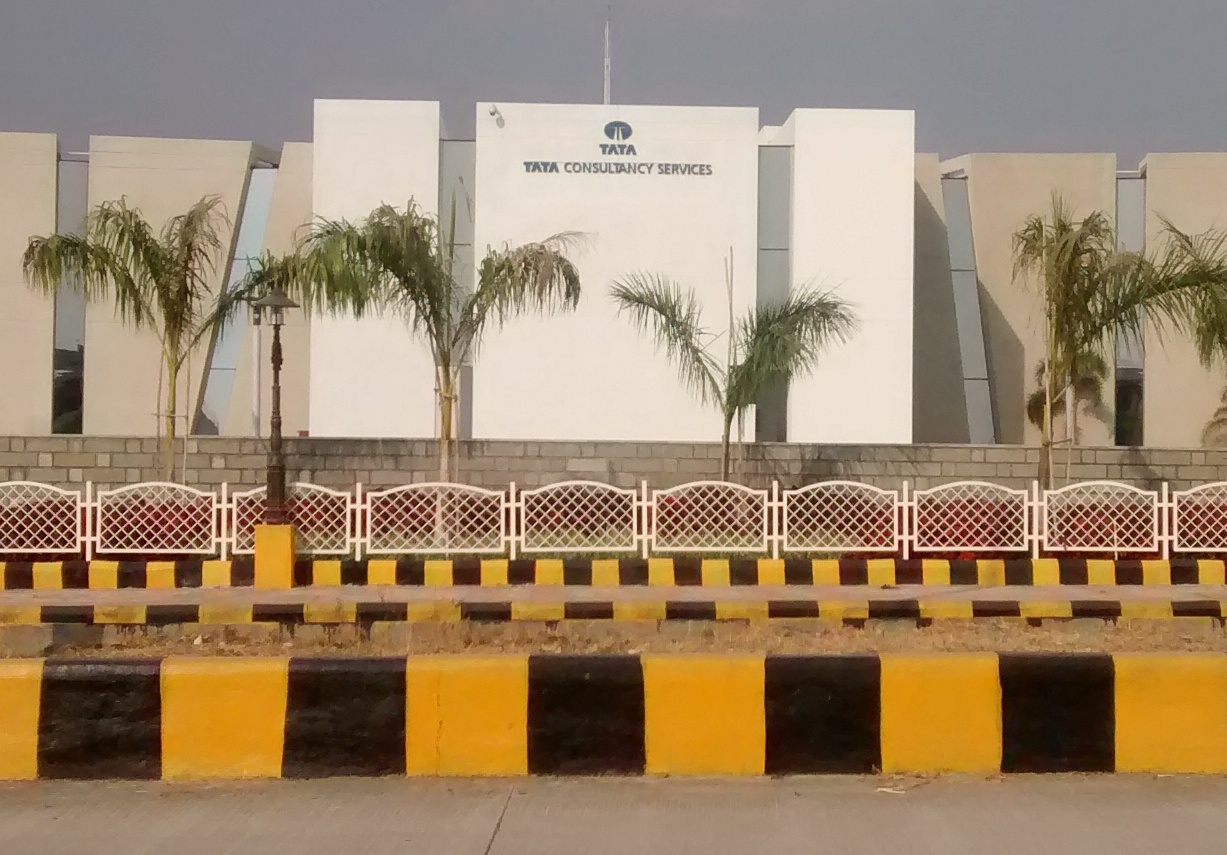
TCS Campus in MIHAN Nagpur

The Multi-modal International Hub Airport at Nagpur (MIHAN) is an ongoing project for the Dr. Babasaheb Ambedkar International Airport, Nagpur. The government of Maharashtra formed a special purpose entity, Maharashtra Airport Development Company, for the development of MIHAN.

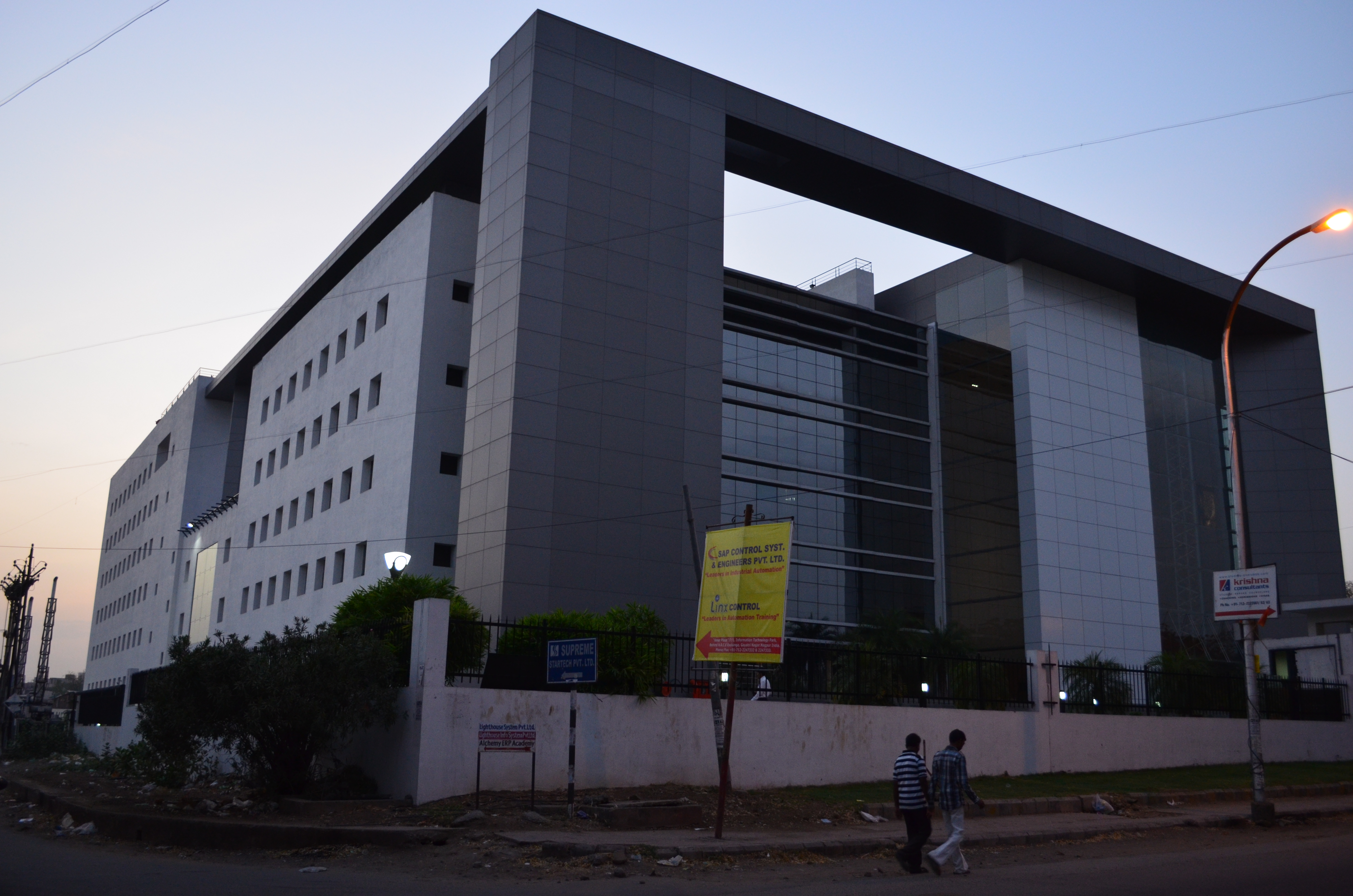
Persistent Campus at IT Park, Parsodi

Prominent Information Technology companies such as TCS, Tech Mahindra, HCL, GlobalLogic, Persistent Systems, Infosys, T-Systems, Ebix, LTIMindtree,Accenture, Zoho, Perficient, Hexaware etc. are located at various IT parks in Nagpur. Tata Advanced Systems, erstwhile TAL Manufacturing Solutions, has its facility in the SEZ for manufacturing structural components for Boeing and Airbus. Air India Engineering Services Limited and AAR-Indamer have their MRO Facility in the SEZ. Dassault Reliance Aerospace Limited (DRAL), Thales Reliance Defence System and pharmaceutical company Lupin also have their manufacturing facilities in MIHAN.

Apart from MIHAN SEZ the city has three prominent MIDC areas nearby. Prominent Industries located at various industrial areas are Indo Rama Synthetics, Gammon India Limited, KEC International, Calderys India, CEAT Tyres, Mahindra and Mahindra, Candico, Pix Transmissions, JSW Steel, ESAB India Ltd, Johnson Lifts, Sintex, Grindwell Norton, Berger Becker Coatings, Horiba India, RCCPL, Adani Wilmar, Mother Dairy, Air Liquide North India, Patanjali Foods, UltraTech Cement, Hindalco Industries, Reliance Industries, Parker Hannifin, Elkem South Asia etc.

The city also has a well developed defence industry with the major public sector defense company, Yantra India, located in the city. Also private sector defence companies such as BrahMos Aerospace, Solar Industries and Economic Explosives Limited are located in the city.

The city is also fast growing as a logistics hub and houses three Inland Container Depot, one each of Container Corporation of India, Distribution Logistics Infrastructure and Adani Logistics.

Owing to rich natural resources in the region, mining is a major activity. Several government organisations related to the mining industry are based or located in Nagpur, which includes Western Coalfields Limited (one of the eight fully owned subsidiaries of Coal India Limited), MOIL, Mineral Exploration and consultancy Limited, Geological Survey of India and Indian Bureau of Mines.

== Culture ==
=== Cultural events and literature ===
The city contains people from other Indian states as well as people belonging to the world's major faiths, and yet is known for staying calm during communal conflicts in India. Nagpur plays host to cultural events throughout the year. Cultural and literary societies in Nagpur include Vidarbha Sahitya Sangh (for development of Marathi), Vidarbha Rashtrabhasha Prachar Samiti (promotion and spreading Hindi) and Vidarbha Hindi Sahitya Sammelan (for promoting Hindi). Marathi Sahitya Sammelan, the conference on Marathi Literature were held twice in Nagpur city. Nagpur also hosts the annual Orange City Literature festival since 2019 and Vidarbha Literary Fest since 2020, featuring local and international authors. Nagpur is the head office of Aadim Samvidhan Sanrakshan Samiti (working for the rights of scheduled tribes).

The South-Central Zone Cultural Centre also sponsors cultural events in Nagpur city, such as the Orange City Craft Mela and Folk Dance Festival, Vidarbha which is noted for its numerous folk-dances such as the human tiger. Newspapers are published from Nagpur in Marathi, English and Hindi. In addition, the Government of Maharashtra organises a week-long Kalidas Festival, a series of music and dance performances, by national level artists. Nagpur Municipal Corporation in partnership with Maharashtra Tourism Development Corporation organises Nagpur Mohotsav at Yeshwant Stadium, in which many distinguish artists participate. The Nagpur Municipal Corporation also organises the Orange City International Film Festival (OCIFF) annually, in association with Saptak, Pune Film Foundation, Vidarbha Sahitya Sangh, and Rashtrasant Tukadoji Maharaj Nagpur University (RTMNU).

The Nagpur Central Museum (est. 1863) maintains collections are mainly for Vidarbha region. Three brothers Ghulam Ali (Kotwal), Mohammad Saaduddin (Subedar) and Mohammad Saladuddin (Minister and Kotwal) from Jhajjar are remembered as great scholars of Urdu and Persian during the reign of Maharaja Senasaheb Subha Chhatrapati Raghuji Bapusaheb Bhonsle III. They founded 'Jhajjar Bagh' at Hansapuri (Now Mominpura). In this location, they built their residence 'Aina-e Mahal', a well and a Masjid (now Masjid Ahle Hadith). 'Jhajjar Bagh' also known as 'Subedar ka Bada' was located where nowadays Mohammad Ali Road at Mominpura, Jamia Masjid, Mohammad Ali Sarai and Furqania Madrasa are located.

In 2013 NMC erected the gigantic Namantar Shahid Smarak in memory of Namantar Andolan martyrs. The Orange City LGBTQ Pride March is also held annually in Nagpur, along with the Nagpur LGBT Queer Carnival during the pride month

=== Religious places and festivals ===
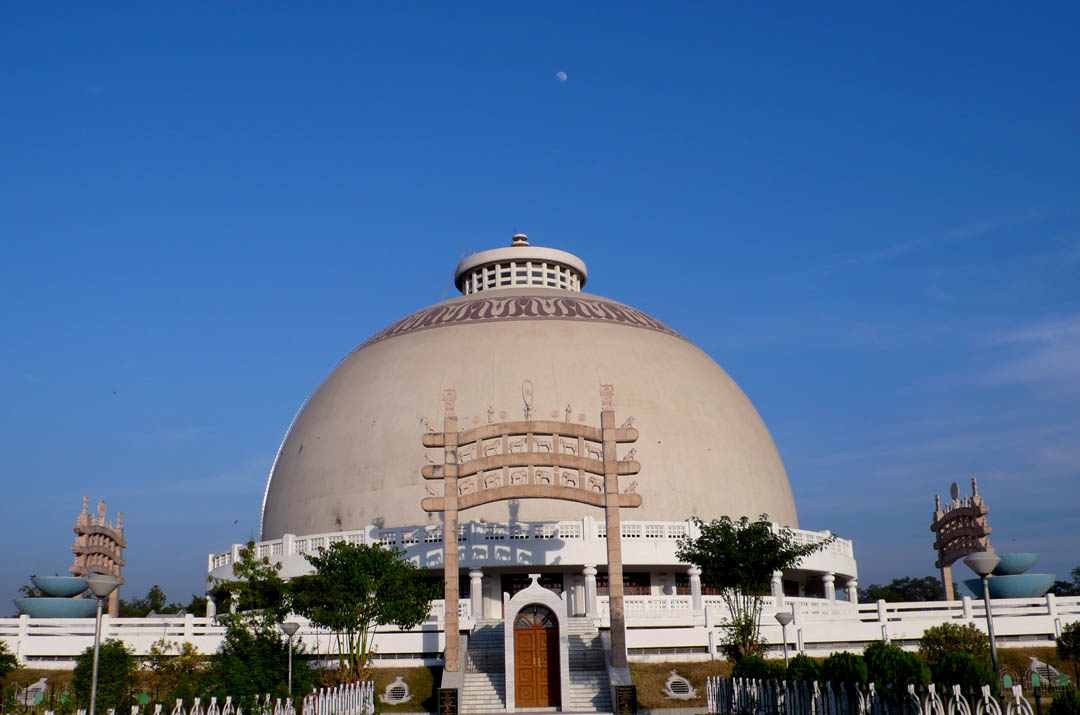
Deeksha Bhoomi

Deekshabhoomi, the largest hollow stupa, and an important place of the Buddhist movement is located in Nagpur. Every year on the day of Vijayadashami, i.e. Dussehra, followers of Ambedkar visit Deekshabhoomi to mark the conversion ceremony of Ambedkar and his followers in Nagpur into Buddhism that took place on 14 October 1956. In March 2016, the Maharashtra Government ranked it as an 'A' grade tourist place. 14 April, which is the birthdate of Ambedkar, is celebrated as Ambedkar Jayanti.

Jainism has a large presence in Nagpur. There are nearly 30 Jain temples. The old ones are Sengan Jain temple Ladpura, Parwarpura Jain temple, Kirana oli Jain temple, and Juna oli Jain temple. Situated in western Nagpur is also the Shri 1008 Shantinath Digamber Bhagwan temple.

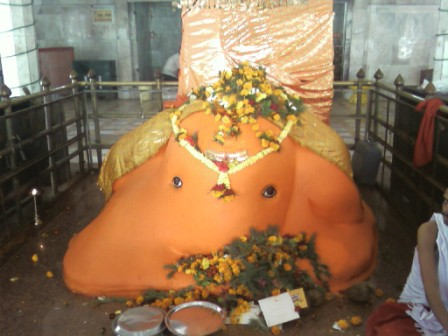
Shri Ganesh

The most famous temple in Nagpur is Tekdi Ganesh Mandir, and is said to be one of the Swayambhu ("self-manifested") temples in the city. Sri Poddareshwar Ram Mandir Koradi Shree Mahalaxmi Jagdamba Mata Mandir, popularly known as Koradi Devi Temple, is located in Koradi City near Nagpur. It is one of the famous devi temples in Vidarbha. There are 51 Shakti-peeths of Devi. The Koradi Devi Temple is considered as one of the Shakti-peeths. On Navratri more than 50,000 lamps were lighted at the temple premises.

Religious events are observed in the city throughout the year. Ram Navami is celebrated in Nagpur with shobha yatra with a procession of floats depicting events from the Ramayana. Processions are also held on important festivals of other religions such as Dhamma Chakra Pravartan Din, Vijayadashami, Mawlid, Guru Nanak Jayanti, Mahavir Jayanti, Durga Puja, Ganesh Chaturthi and Muharram. Like the rest of India, Nagpurkars celebrate major Hindu festivals like Diwali, Holi and Dussera with enthusiasm. Celebrations lasting for several days are held on Ganesh Chaturthi and Durga Puja festivals in virtually every small locality in the city.

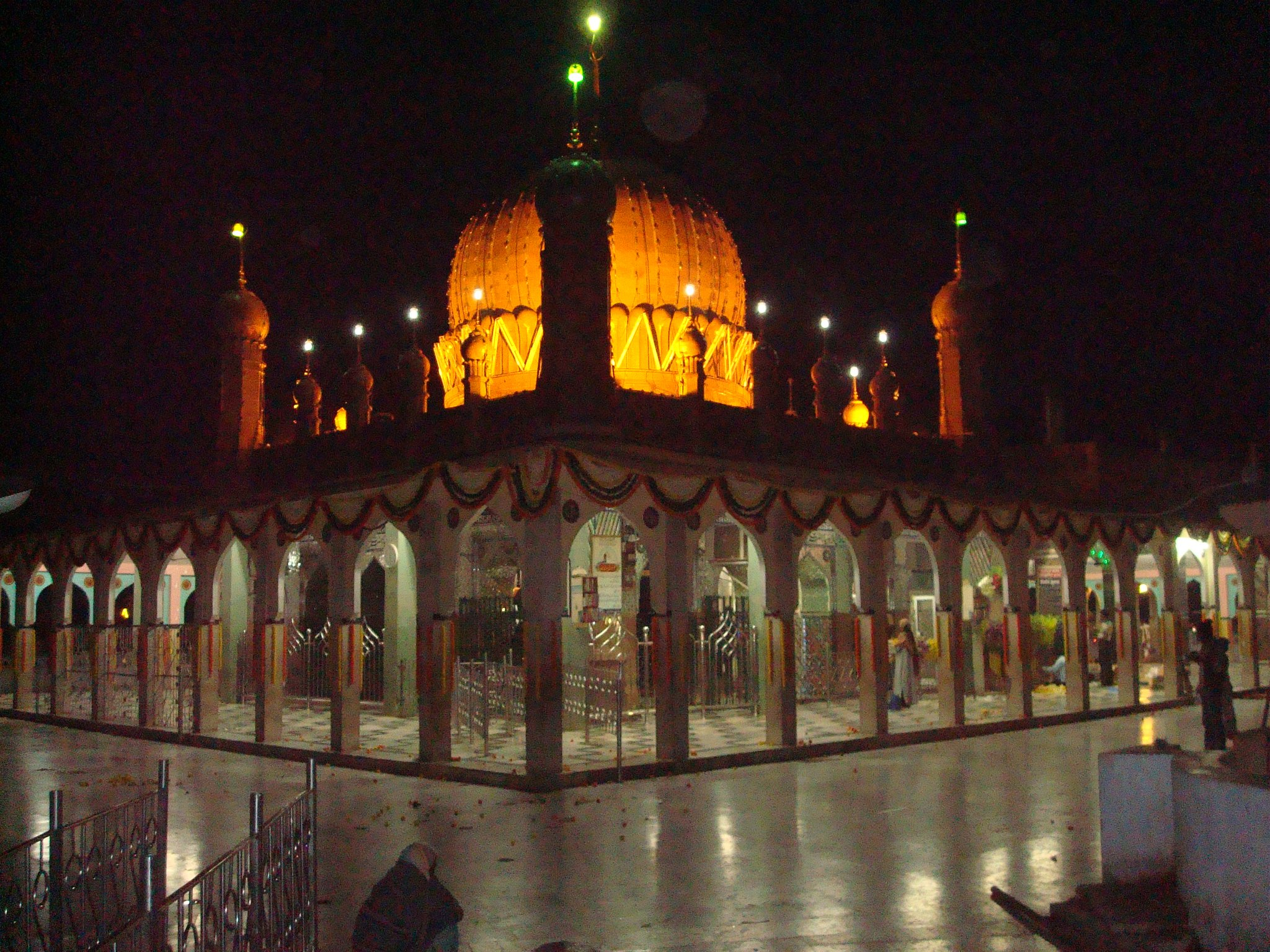
Dargah Baba Tajuddin

The city also contains a sizeable Muslim population, and famous places of worship for Muslims include the Jama Masjid-Mominpura and Bohri Jamatkhana-Itwari. The most famous shrine (dargah) of Tajuddin Muhammad Badruddin is at Tajabad. Annual Urs is celebrated in great enthusiasm and unity on 26th of Muharram. Nagpur Is also called as Tajpur as the holy shirine of Sufi Saint Baba Tajuddin.

The St. Francis De Sales Cathedral is located in Sadar as well as the All Saints Cathedral church. There are many south Indian temples in Nagpur like Sarveshwara Devalayam, where all south Indian festivals are celebrated like Sitarama Kalyanam, Radha Kalyanam Dhanurmasa celebration with Andal Kalyanam, Balaji temple in seminary hills where every year Bramhotsavam to Lord Balaji and Lord Kartikeya is celebrated here. There are 2 Ayyapa temples, one at Ayyapa Nagar and the other at Harihara Nagar, Raghvendraswami Mutt, Murugananda Swami Temple at Mohan Nagar, Nimishamba Devi temple Subramanyiam devastanam at Sitabuldi and many more such south Indian temples are here in Nagpur as there is quite a good populations of south Indians in Nagpur.

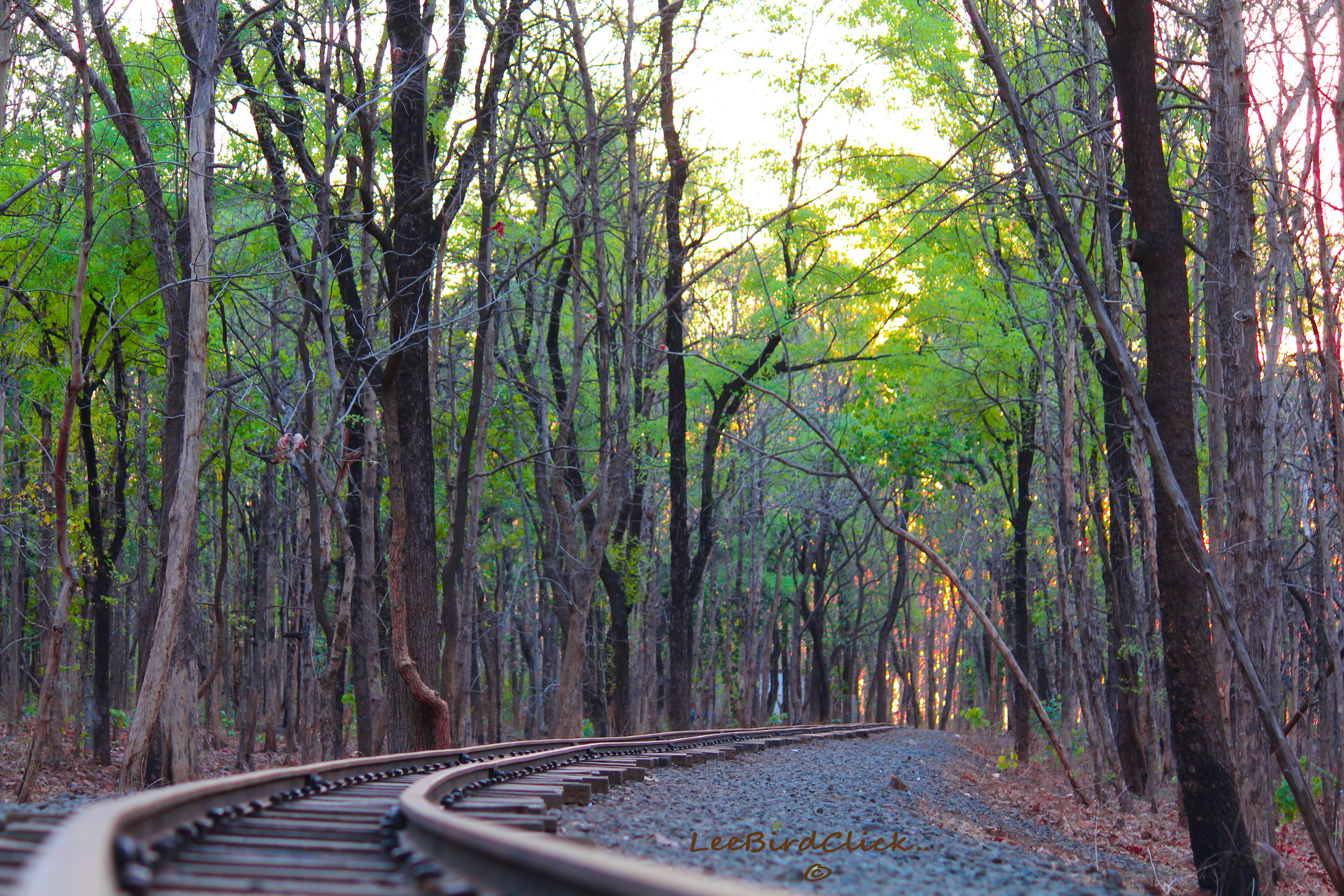
Seminary Hills of Nagpur

Marbat Festival is a unique festival for Nagpur and is organised every year a day after the bullock festival of 'Pola'. The tradition of taking out the Marbat processions of 'kali' (black) and 'pivli' (yellow) Marbats (idols), started in 1880 in the eastern part of the city. A number of 'badgyas' (Marathi) (Meaning Mascots in English), representing contemporary symbols of evil, comprise another feature of the annual processions. This festival dates back to the 19th century when the Bhonsla dynasty ruled.

There is a Parsi Zoroastrian Agiary (Dar-e-Meher) in Nagpur, where the Parsi New Year is celebrated by the Parsi community in Nagpur.

=== Arts and crafts ===
The tradition of painting in Nagpur was patronised by the Royal House of the Bhonsales as well as common people. Illustrated manuscripts, including of the Bhagavat, Jnaaneshwari, Shakuntala, and Geeta, and the folk patachitras related to some festivals are available besides murals. The community of artists was called chitaris (painters), and this community has today turned to sculpt.

Textile was once an important industry in Nagpur. Good quality cotton was produced in abundant quantities thanks to a suitable soil and climate. With the introduction of the railways, cotton sales and goods transport flourished. Besides cotton textiles, silk and wool weaving was also practised in the district. Silk sarees and pagota, patka, dhoti, and borders were woven with the silk thread.

Every year Nagpur celebrates Orange City Literature Festival in the month of November.

=== Cuisine ===
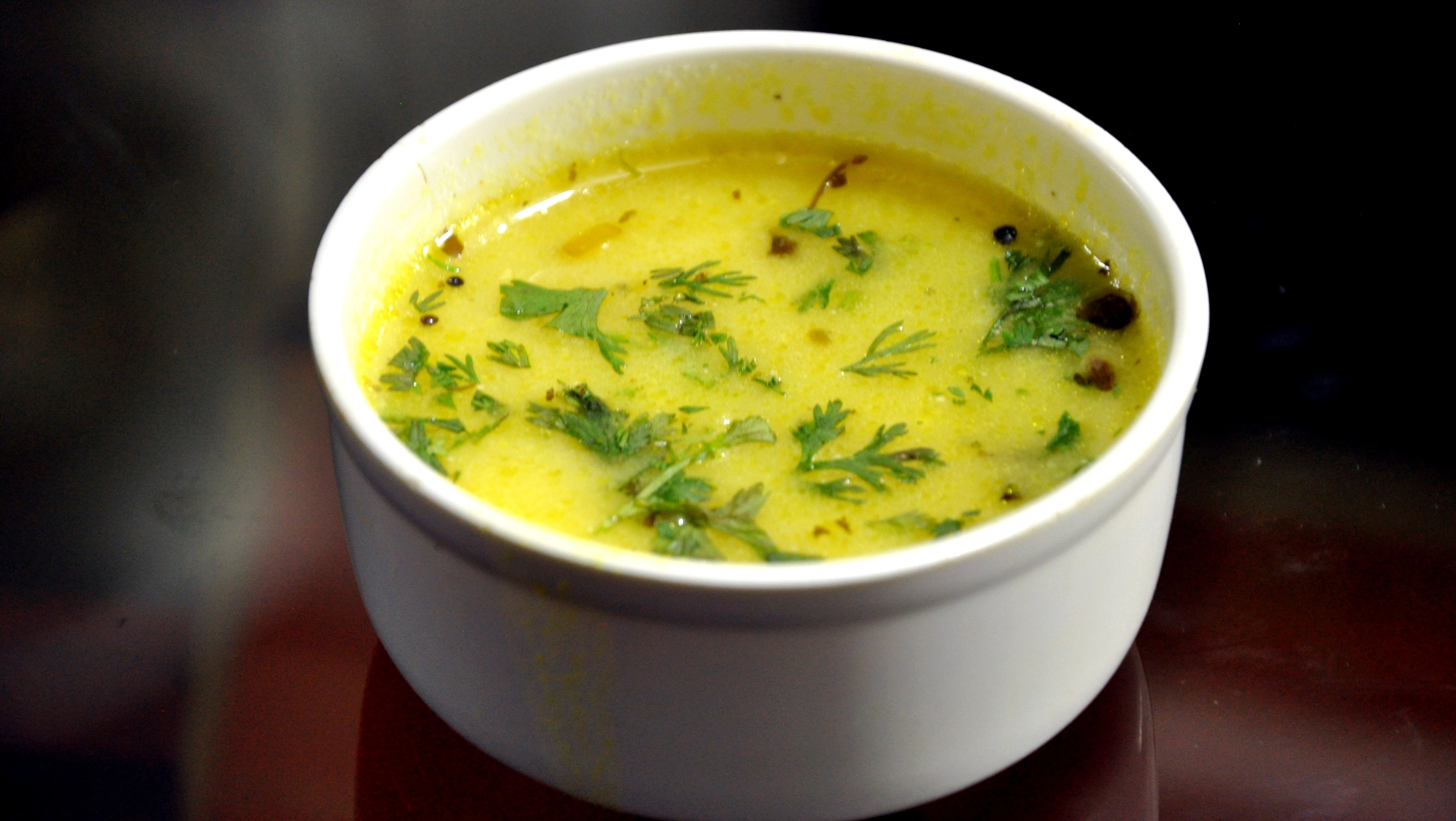
Kadhi-Traditional dish of Nagpur

The Vidharbha region has its own distinctive cuisine known as the Varhadi cuisine or Saoji cuisine. Saoji or Savji cuisine was the main cuisine of the Savji community. This traditional food is known for its spicy taste. The special spices used in the gravy include black pepper, dry coriander, bay leaves, grey cardamom, cinnamon, cloves, and ample use of poppy seeds. Non-vegetarian food especially chicken and mutton are commonly eaten in Saoji establishments in Nagpur. There are numerous Savji bhojanalays in Nagpur which are so popular in Maharashtra that the Indian chef Sanjeev Kapoor once featured Savji mutton on one of his TV shows and the recipe is listed on his website. Nagpur is also famous for its oranges, which have some typical qualities have recently begun to attract international attention. Numerous beverages are made out of the oranges. Santra Barfi is also a famous dish, arising from orange which is produced locally in Nagpur. Mominpura is a majority Muslim area of the city and it is famous for its Mughal dishes and Biryani. The city is also famous for rare black chickens called Kadaknath Chicken which are cooked in varhadi style.

Nagpur is also famous for tarri poha, a variety of flattened rice, with a spicy chana curry and has many food joints; each having their own way of preparing and serving it. Samosas are also famous in Nagpur and is available at many restaurants and food spots. Another famous food is Patodi and Kadhi.

== Tourism ==
=== Tiger reserves ===
Nagpur is surrounded by many tiger reserves and acts as a gateway, hence called Tiger capital of India. Tiger reserves such as Pench Tiger Reserve is situated around 100 km from the city and can be reached through NH44 in Nagpur Jabalpur road. Tadoba National Park is situated south of the city and is around 141 km from the city. Umred Karhandla Wildlife Sanctuary, Bor Wildlife Sanctuary, Navegaon National Park, Melghat Tiger Reserve and Kanha Tiger Reserve are the other tiger reserves which are located at a radius of 200 km from the city. The city has its own reserved forest area at Seminary Hills and Gorewada.

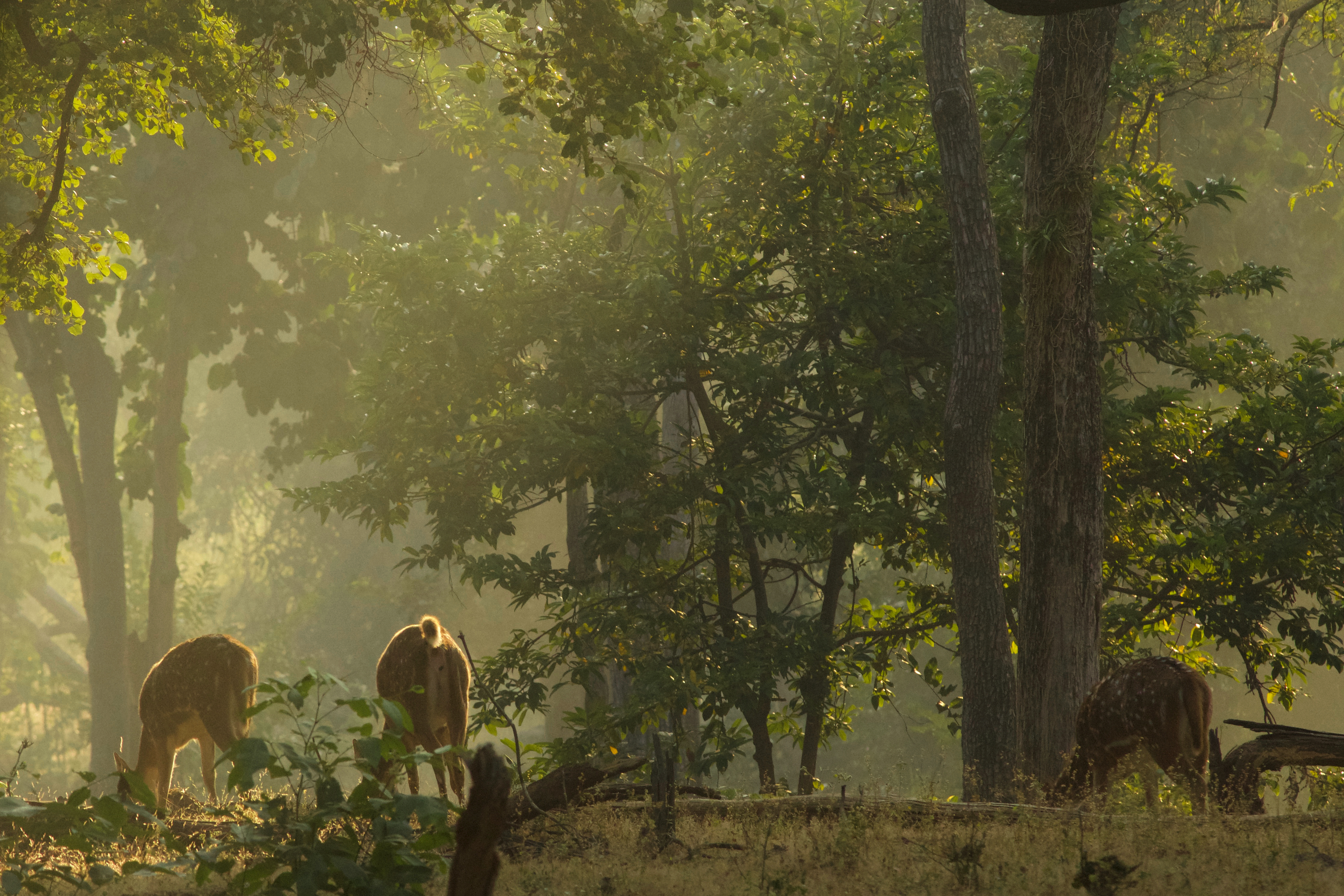
Pench Tiger reserve

=== Zoos, gardens and lakes ===
Maharajbagh zoo is an existing zoo which is located in the heart of the city near Sitabuldi and consists of a variety of animals. Balasaheb Thackeray Gorewada International Zoological Park is an international zoo which has been set up beside Gorewada Lake and offers Wildlife Safari

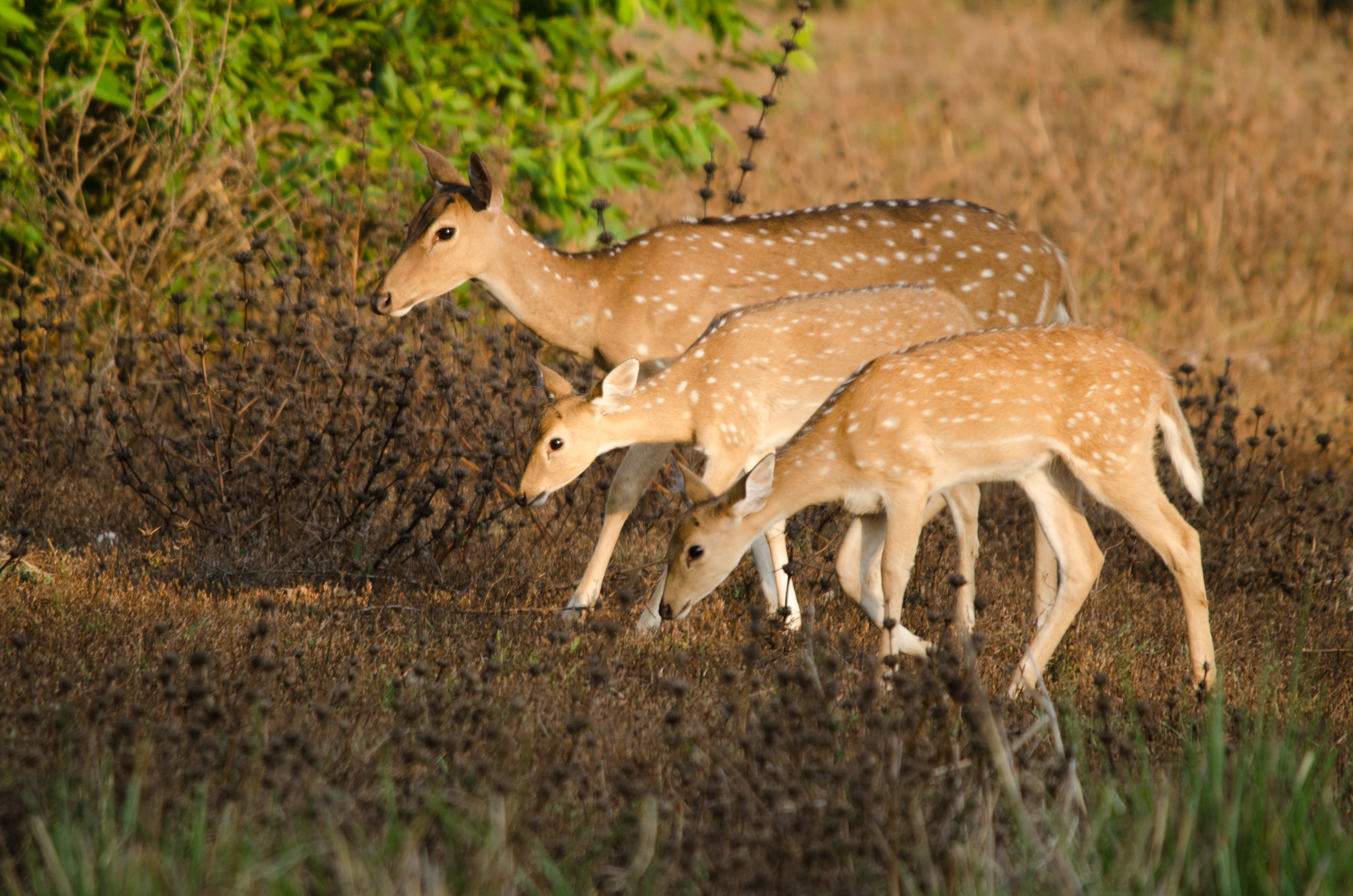
Tadoba Andhari tiger reserve

The city consist of various natural and man made lakes. Khindsi Lake, Ambazari Lake and Gorewada Lake are the natural lakes of the city while Futala Lake, Shukrawari Lake, Sakkardara Lake, Zilpi Lake and Sonegaon lake are the man made lakes. Futala Lake is being redeveloped as the world's second largest Lighting and Musical fountain which would be available for public show on tickets. The city also has various gardens which consist of Ambazari Garden, Telankhedi Garden, Satpuda Botanical Garden, Japanese Garden and Children's Traffic Park. Apart from gardens the city also consists of various water parks.

Virendra Kumar, Union Minister of Social justice and Empowerment 26 August 2022 announced that the central government with the help of the state government will create Maharashtra's First ever "Divyang Park" and the procedure in this endeavour has started. This park will be peculiar and will have different types of facilities for Divyangjans such as textiles pathways, smell, and touch gardens, sensory gardens, Skill training facilities, sports, rehabilitation facilities, and infotainment.

=== Religious places ===
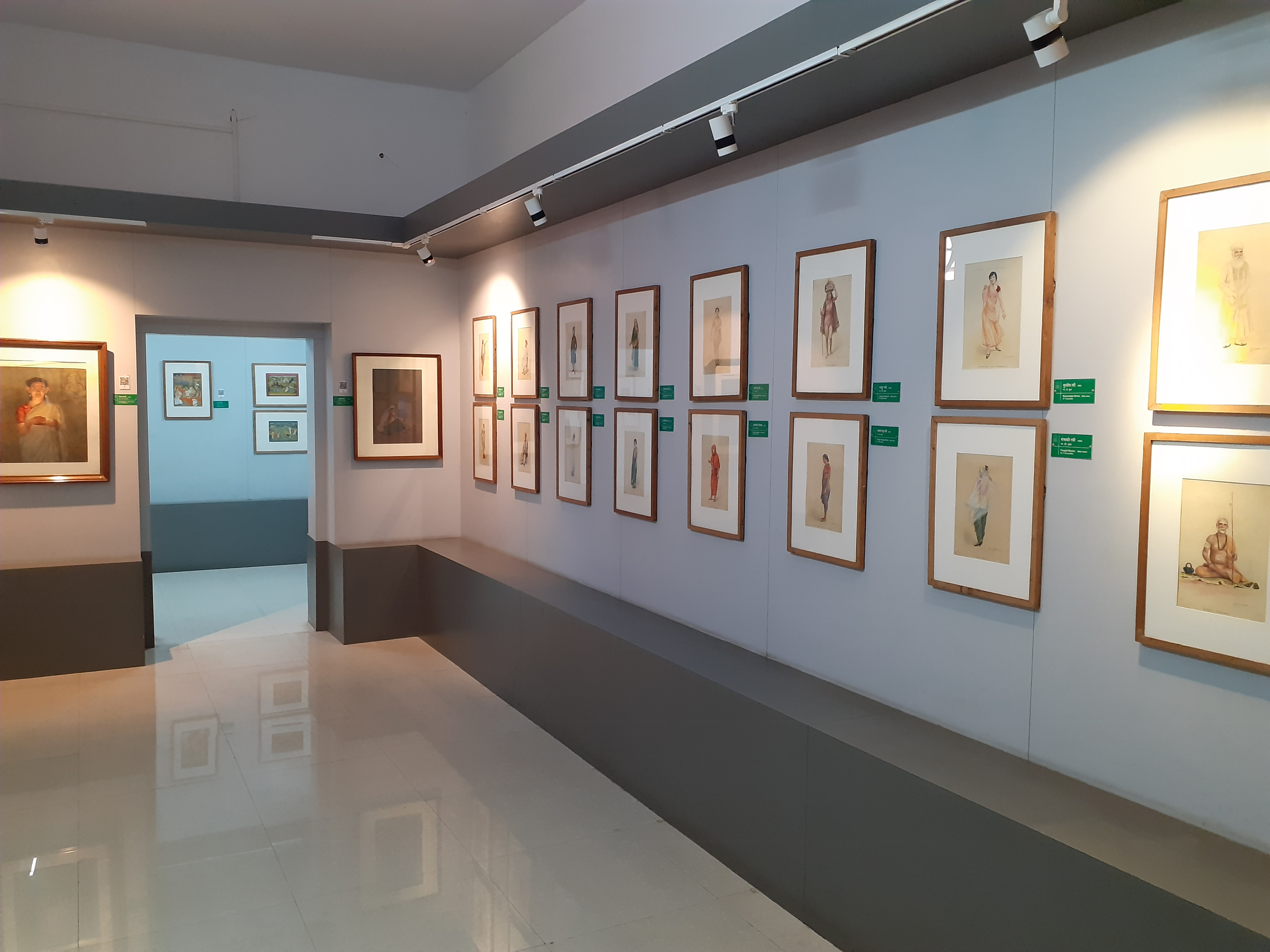
Nagpur Central Museum

Nagpur boasts many religious structures that hold importance for differing religious beliefs. Deekshabhoomi and Dragon Palace are important religious places for Buddhists across India and the world. Deekshabhoomi is the place where B. R. Ambedkar with millions of his followers embraced Buddhism in the year 1956. Dragon Palace Temple is situated at Kamptee which is around 15 km (9.3 mi) from the city. It also has a state of the art Vipassana centre which was inaugurated by President of India Ram Nath Kovind on 22 September 2017. Other prominent religious structures include Ramtek Fort Temple at Ramtek which is a temple built inside a fort and is 55 km (34 mi) away from Nagpur, Adasa Ganpati Temple located near Savner is one of the eight Ashta Vinayaks in Vidarbha, Baba Tajjuddin Dargah, Shri Shantinath Digambar Jain Mandir at Ramtek, Shree Ganesh Mandir Tekdi, located near Nagpur Railway Station and one of the Swayambhu temple of Lord Ganesha, Sai Baba Mandir at Wardha road, Telankhedi Hanuman Temple, Swaminarayan Temple, Koradi Temple, located at Koradi, Shri Poddareshwar Ram Temple, Balaji Temple, Siddhivinayak Temple at Zilpi, Hingna, Shri Devguru Brihaspati Dham Kshetra Chowki, at Chowki Vangram under Sawali Bibi Gram Panchayat in Hingna, All Saints Cathedral and Gurudwara Guru Nanak Darbar.

=== Museums ===
The city also has several museums, such as the Nagpur Central Museum and the Narrow Gauge Rail Museum.The Raman Science Centre is a science museum and planetarium in Central India, that holds many interactive scientific installations and a facility called the Science on a Sphere.

== Transport ==
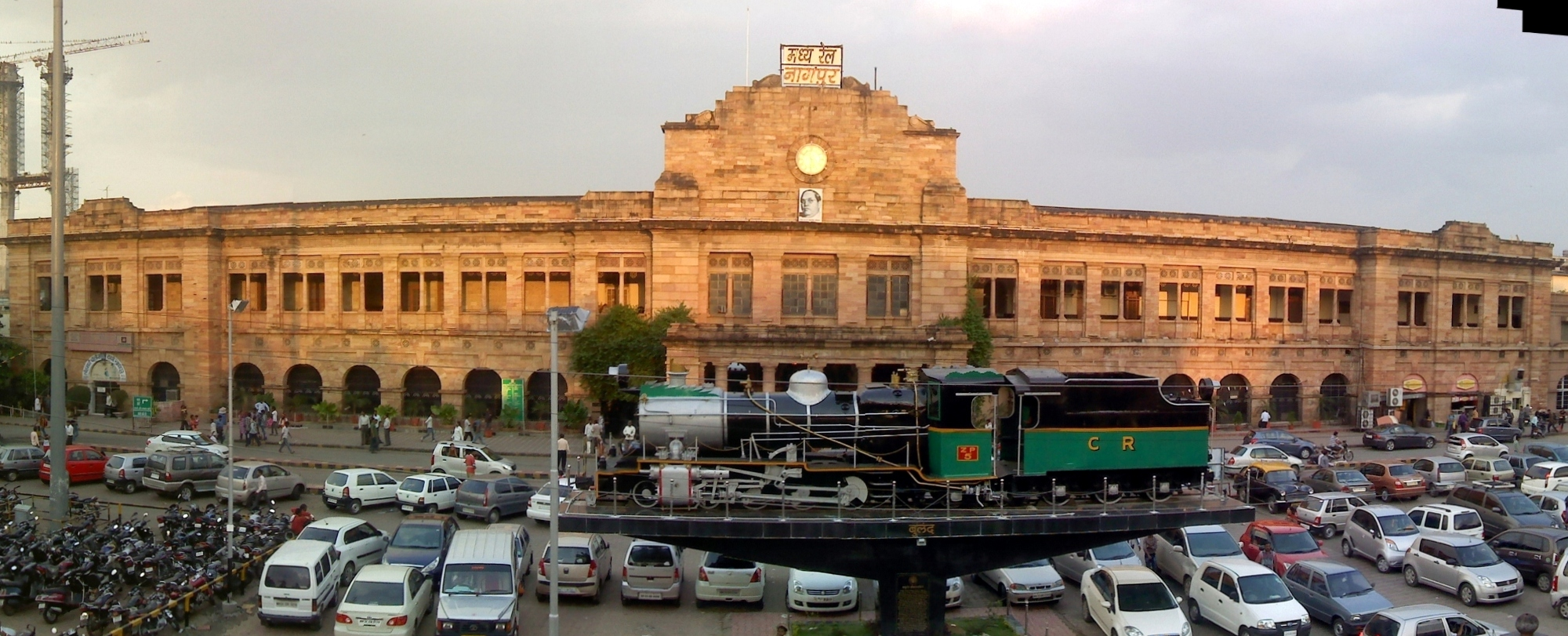
Nagpur Junction Railway Station building

=== Rail ===
In 1867, the first railway in Nagpur started operations, when a portion of the Bombay-Bhusaval-Nagpur line was opened for traffic. A train service from Nagpur to Calcutta was started in 1881. Today, a total of 254 trains stop at Nagpur railway station. These include Passenger, Express/Mail, Duronto, Rajdhani, Garib Rath, Humsafar Express, Vande Bharat Express trains. Of these 65 are daily trains and 22 terminate/originate from Nagpur. Almost 160,000 passengers patron Nagpur Railway Station. It is one of the oldest and busiest stations in India, and was inaugurated in its present on 15 January 1925 by the then Governor Sir Frank. Apart from the Nagpur railway station, Ajni railway station and Itwari railway station are the important stations in the city. Other railway stations in the city include Motibagh, Kamptee, Kalamna, Khapri and Godhani. Nagpur-Ajni rail route which is just three km (1.9 mi) long, is the shortest train run in Indian Railways primarily meant for crew to travel from Nagpur station to the workshop at Ajni.

The city is the divisional headquarters for the Central Railway and South East Central Railway Zone of Indian Railways. Nagpur is a city with two divisional headquarters, a rare distinction it shares with Lucknow, which has headquarters for two different divisions in Northern Railway zone and North Eastern Railway zone.

=== Nagpur Metro Rail ===
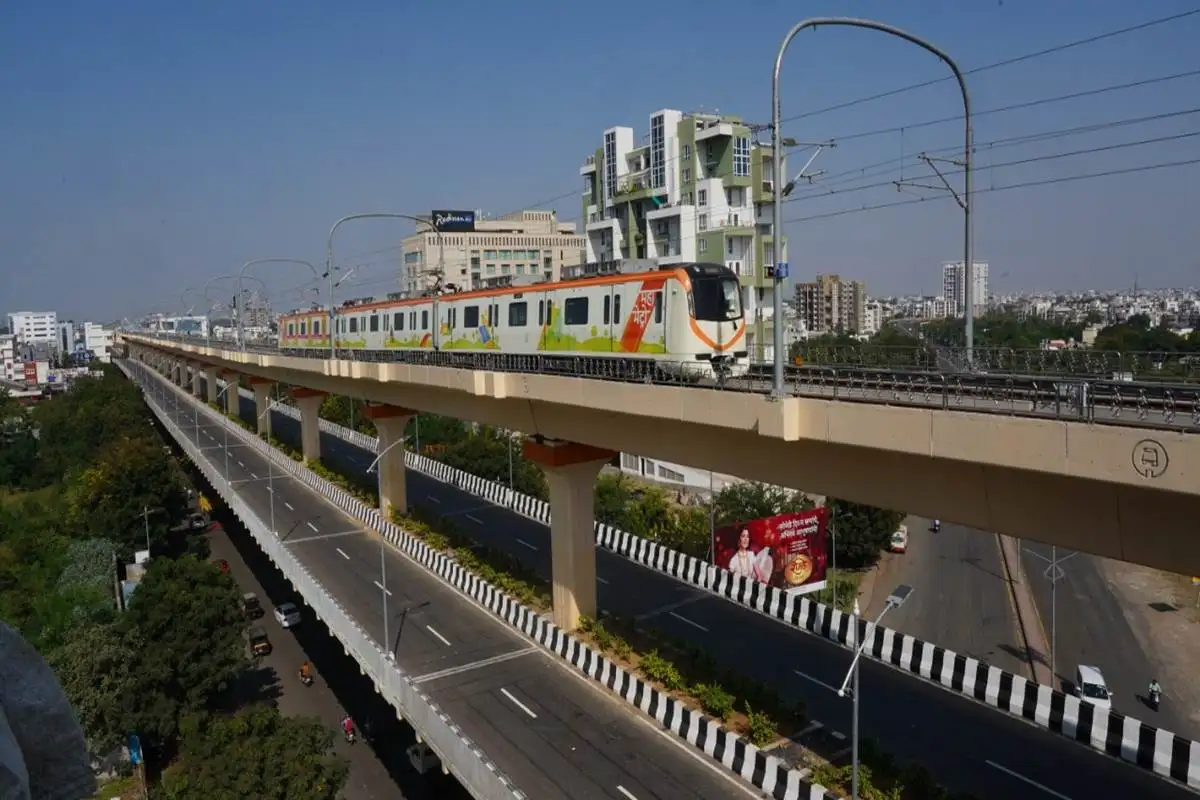
Nagpur Metro

Nagpur Metro is a rapid transit system of the city which is operated by Maharashtra Metro Rail Corporation Limited (erstwhile Nagpur Metro Rail Corporation Ltd.) and started its operations on 8 March 2019. Full-fledged operation of the Phase I was inaugurated by Prime Minister Narendra Modi on 11 December 2022. On 1 January 2023, Nagpur Metro made the record for single-day ridership of 2,02,608 passengers. Construction of Phase II has also started. The social impact of the project has also been discussed in literature. Journalist Sarita Kaushik, in her book Better Than the Dream: A People's Story, describes the Nagpur Metro as an example of urban infrastructure shaping everyday mobility and social life in the city.

=== Road ===
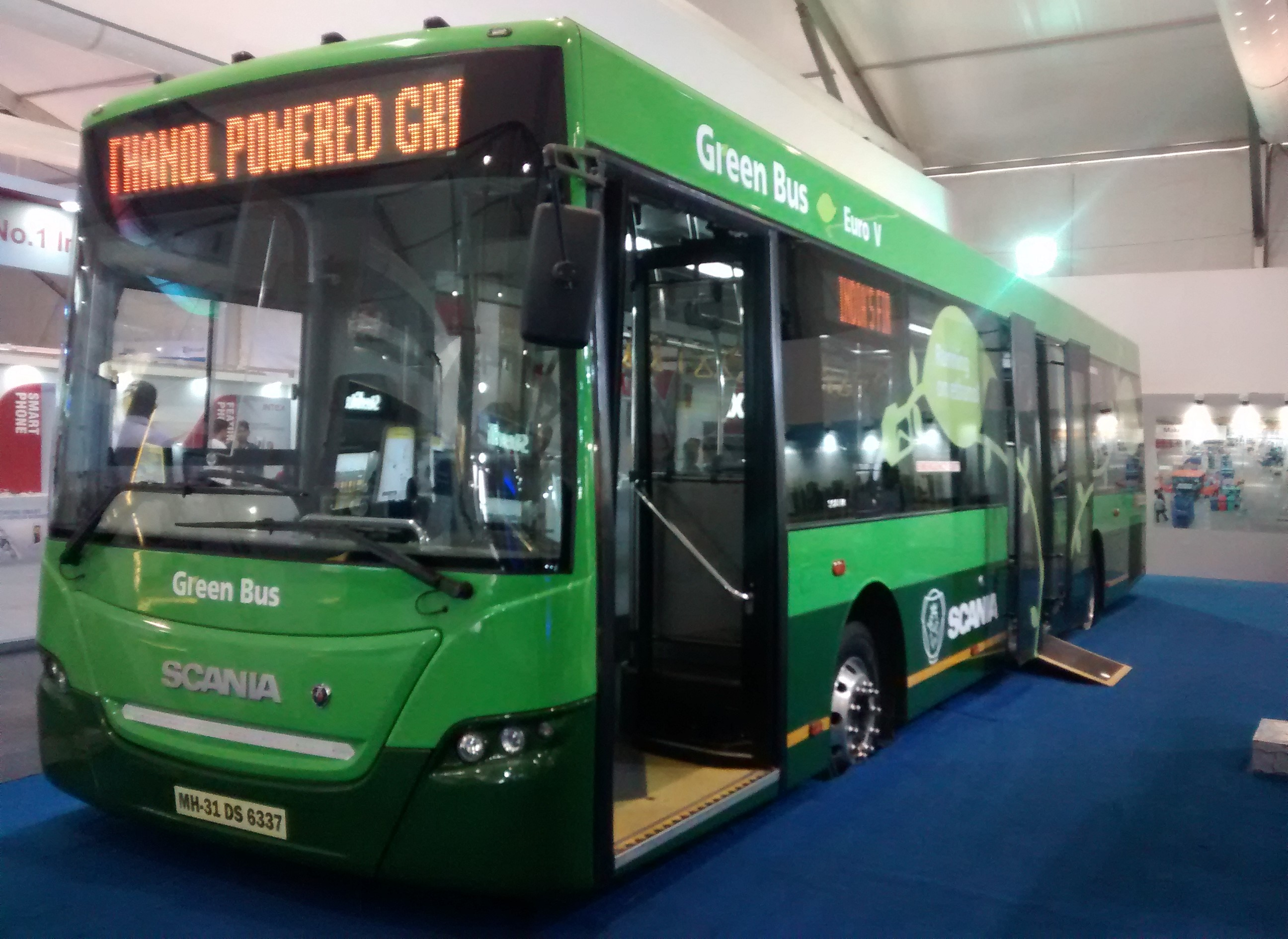
Green Bus in Nagpur

Nagpur is a major junction for roadways as India's two major national highways, Srinagar-Kanyakumari (National Highway 44) and Mumbai-Kolkata (National Highway 53) pass through the city. National Highway 47 connects Nagpur to Bamanbore in Gujarat. Nagpur is at the junction of two Asian Highways namely AH43 Agra to Matara, Sri Lanka and AH46 connecting Kharagpur, India to Dhule, India. The highway to Mumbai via Aurangabad, a shorter route, was re-built on the national highway basis. This highway significantly reduces the distance travelled by NH 6 and NH 3 between two cities. In 2009, NHAI announced the extension of the existing NH 204 to Nagpur via Kolhapur-Sangli- Solapur-Tuljapur-Latur-Nanded-Yavatmal-Wardha and connecting it to the NH-44 at Butibori near Nagpur. The entire NH 204 highway has been included in the national highway mega projects for upgradation to 4-lanes, which is now completed. One more national highway NH-547 Savner-Chhindwara-Narsinghpur has connected with NH 47 at Savner near Nagpur providing another optional connectivity with the northern part of India.

Maharashtra State Road Transport Corporation (MSRTC) runs cheaper transport service for intercity, interstate, and intrastate travel. It has two bus stations in Nagpur: Nagpur Bus Sthanak (CBS-1) at Ganeshpeth and MorBhawan (CBS-2) at Jhansi Rani Square, Sitabuldi. It operates 1600 daily services from CBS-1 to long and short distances within the state and to places in other surrounding states. It also operates 750 daily services from CBS-2 to short distances within Vidarbha.

The Nagpur Municipal Corporation through its bus operators (three red and one green) plies 730 buses, by which over 200,000 people commute. The city bus operation is named as Aapli Bus (your bus). The operators consist of diesel, ethanol and CNG run buses. A total of 124 routes are covered by city buses. A common mobility card, called MAHA-CARD, has also been issued which will help people commute with buses and the metro rail. A Green bus project featuring India's first ethanol-powered buses was established in August 2014.

Nagpur is connected directly with the state capital, Mumbai with the help of Mumbai–Nagpur Expressway. Other expressways which will link Nagpur in the coming years are Nagpur–Goa Expressway, Nagpur–Hyderabad–Bengaluru Expressway, Nagpur-Bhandara-Gondia Expressway, Bhandara–Gadchiroli Expressway and Nagpur-Chandrapur Expressway.

Other local transport include Autorickshaws and private taxi operators under Ola Cabs, Rapido and Uber cabs.

=== Air transport ===
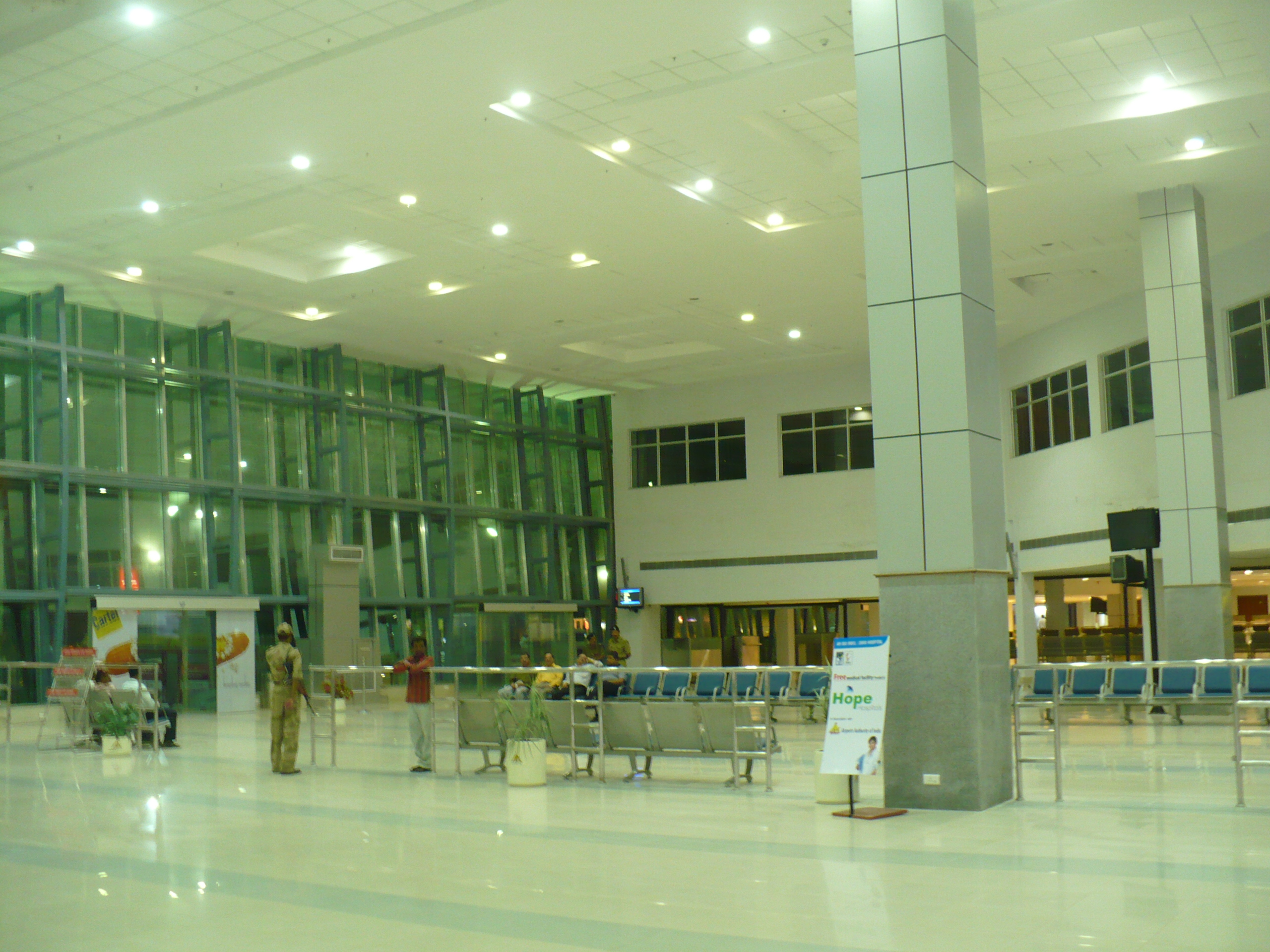
Nagpur International Airport has the busiest air traffic control room in India.

Dr. Babasaheb Ambedkar International Airport (IATA: NAG, ICAO: VANP) is operated by GMR and owned by Airports Authority of India.

Nagpur's Air Traffic Control (ATC) is the busiest in India, with more than 300 flights flying over the city every day in 2004. In October 2005, Nagpur's Sonegaon Airport was declared an international airport and was renamed Dr. Babasaheb Ambedkar International Airport.

Nagpur is well connected by direct flights to Mumbai, New Delhi, Hyderabad, Kolkata, Bangalore, Pune, Indore, Ahmedabad, Goa, Kishangarh and Nanded. These flights are operated by Air India, IndiGo and Star Air. Air Arabia operates a four times a week to and fro flight between Nagpur and Sharjah and Qatar Airways operates a daily direct flight to and from Doha.

The Nagpur Airport has received Special Achievement Award 2012–2013 from Airports Authority of India. Nagpur became the first airport in India to commission the INDRA system and also has ADS-B system. No other airport in the country had commissioned INDRA yet. Nagpur Airport became the first airport in the country to receive an ISO 27000 certificate. In fact, Nagpur is not only the first in India but also the first in world to be certified for Air navigation service provider (ANSP). There are seven airports in the world which have ISO 27000, but none of them have it for ANSP.

The government of India has identified Nagpur Airport as one of the safe airports for diverted flights and emergency landing. In fact, many flights have used the airport during emergencies. This is because all international and domestic airlines had already been informed by the government to go to Nagpur during emergencies. The availability of excellent fire fighting equipment, air traffic control equipment with latest radar, along with availability of good hospitals and hotels in the city, made the airport a good choice during emergencies.

Nagpur Airport has an annual capacity of 1 million passengers, but it handles more passengers than its capacity.

== Education ==
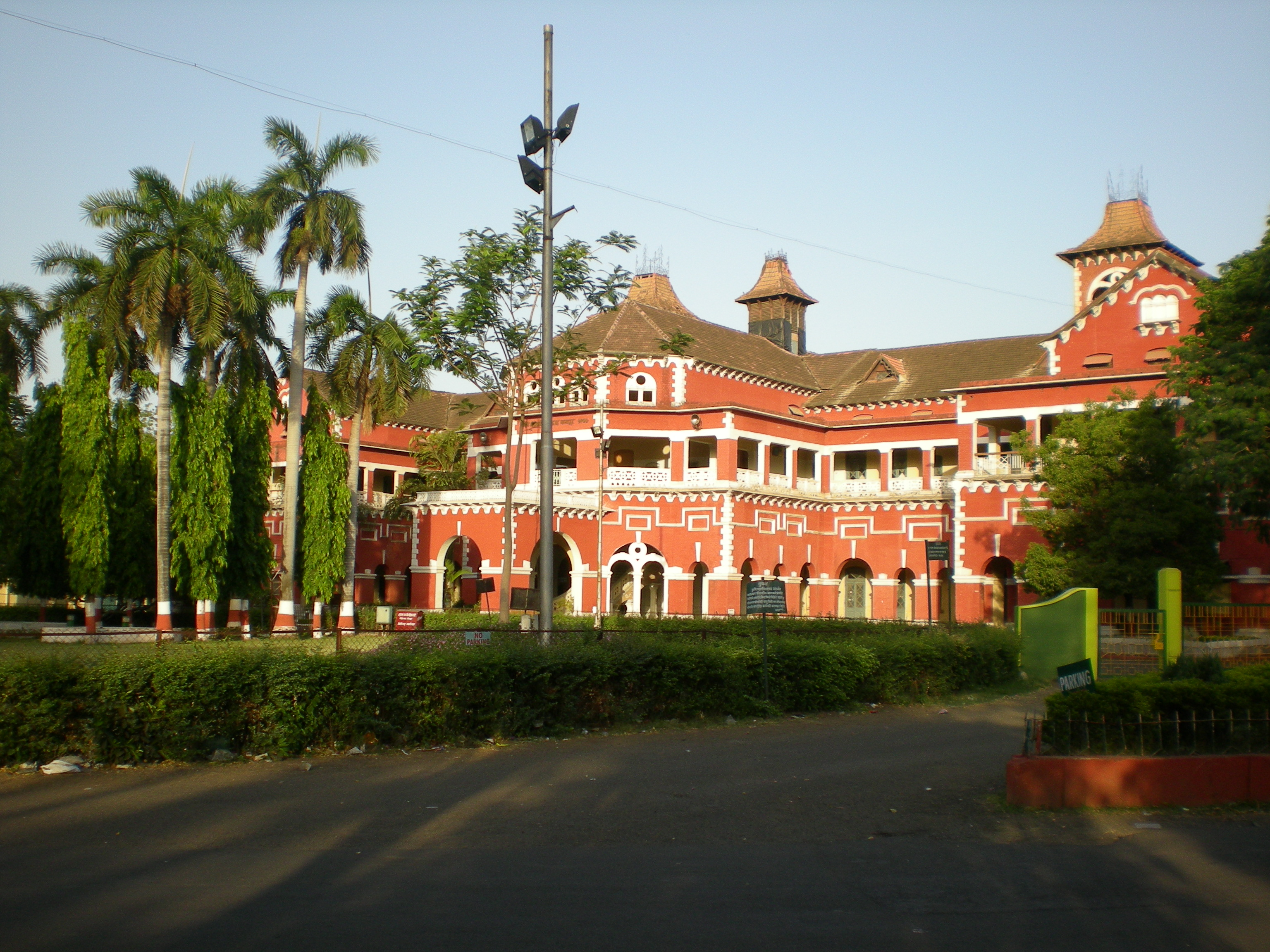
College of Agriculture, Nagpur

Nagpur is a major education hub in Central India.

There are two types of schools in the city. NMC (government) run schools and private schools run by trusts. These schools follow the 10+2+3/4 plan (15 years of schooling leading to the first degree), the first ten years constituting school education consisting of four years primary level, three years of upper primary level and three years of high school level with a public examination at the end of tenth class and 12th class constituting the Secondary and Higher Secondary Board Examination, respectively. This is followed by either a general degree course in a chosen field of study or a professional degree course, such as law, engineering and medicine. These schools are governed by either of the following boards: Maharashtra State Board of Secondary and Higher Secondary Education, Central Board of Secondary Education (CBSE), Indian Certificate of Secondary Education (ICSE), International General Certificate of Secondary Education (IGCSE) and International Baccalaureate (IB).

Admission to professional graduation colleges in Nagpur is through MHT-CET, JEE (Main), CAT, CLAT, GATE, CMAT, GMAT, GPAT and NEET.

Nagpur has five state universities: Rashtrasant Tukadoji Maharaj Nagpur University (RTMNU) (founded in 1923 as Nagpur University, one of the oldest in the country and having more than 400 affiliated colleges), Maharashtra Animal and Fishery Sciences University (MAFSU), Kavikulaguru Kalidas Sanskrit University (KKSU), Maharashtra National Law University (MNLU) & Laxminarayan Innovation Technological University (LITU) and two private university, Ramdeobaba University (RBU) and Lata Mangeshkar University (LMU). Symbiosis International University also has its campus in the city

Nagpur has five government medical colleges, Government Medical College, Indira Gandhi Government Medical College, Nagpur, Government Dental College, Government Ayurvedic College & All India Institute of Medical Sciences, and one private medical college, N.K.P. Salve Institute of Medical Sciences. Medical colleges in the city are affiliated to Maharashtra University of Health Sciences while AIIMS is an autonomous medical university.

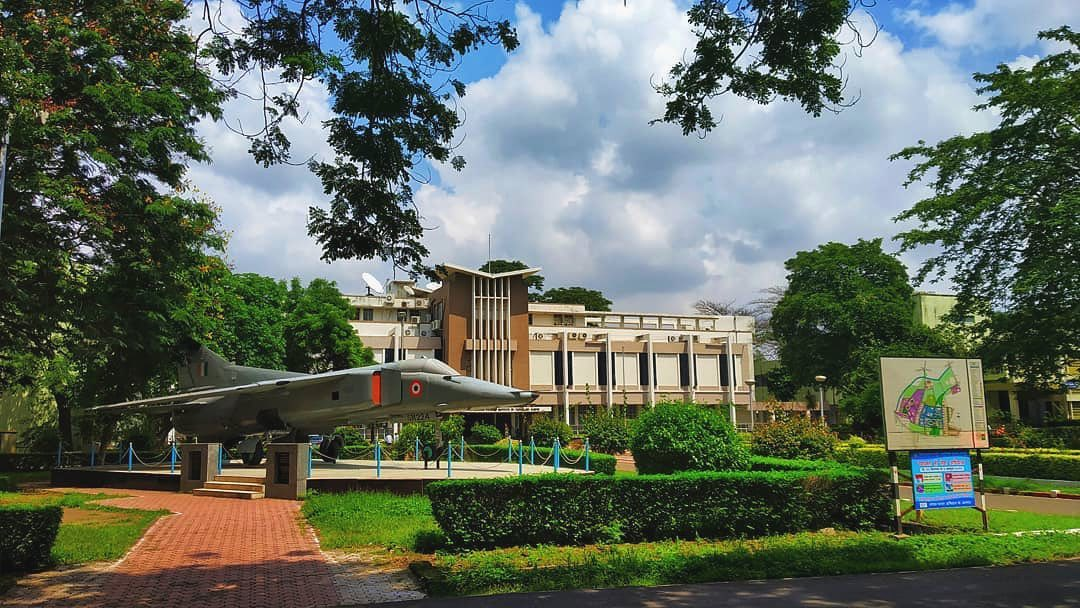
VNIT Nagpur

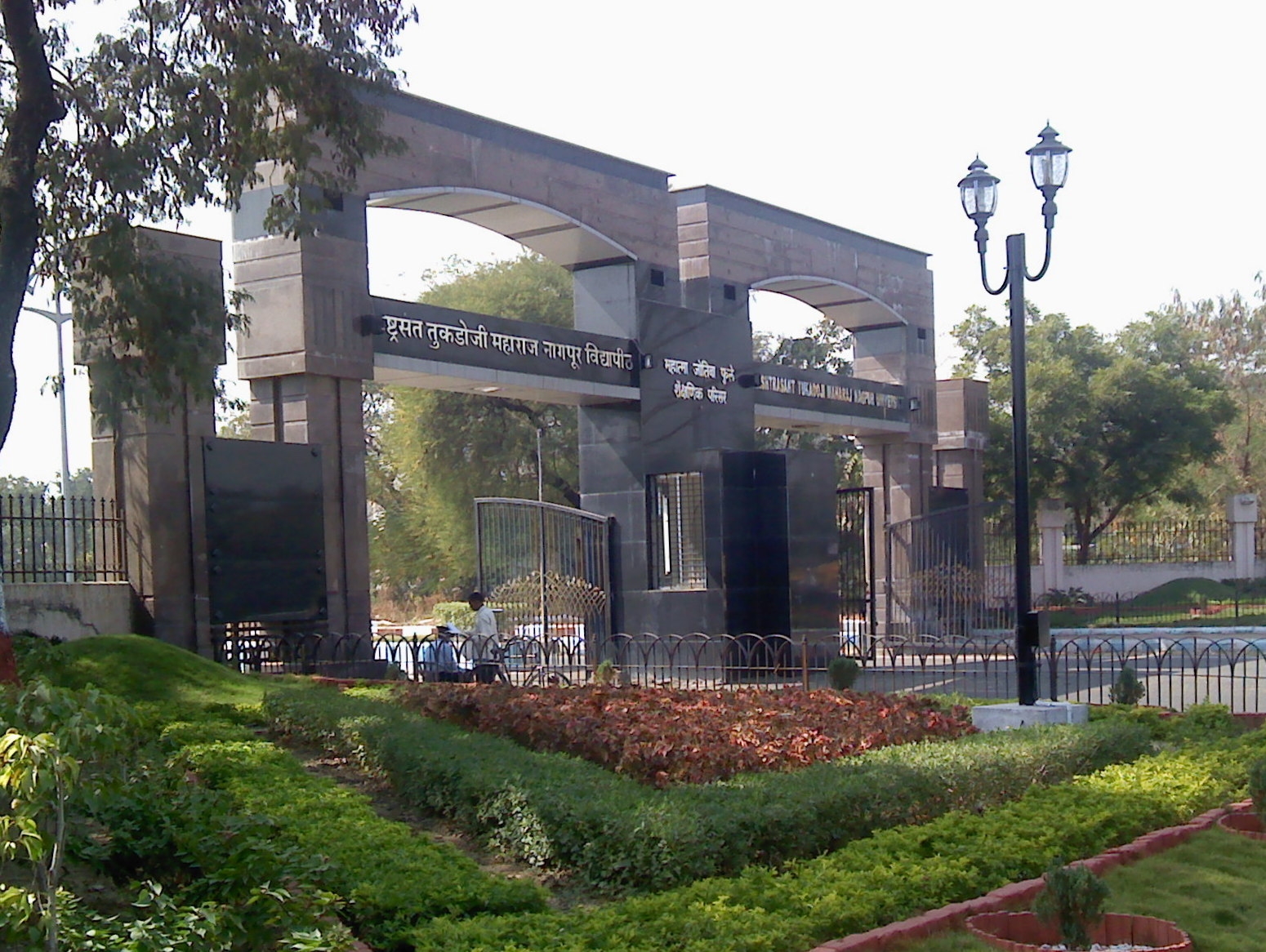
RSTM Nagpur University Campus

Most engineering colleges in the city are affiliated with RTMNU. Government Polytechnic, Nagpur (established 1914) is one of the oldest polytechnic in India. Visvesvaraya National Institute of Technology, located in the city, is the only NIT in Maharashtra. Indian Institute of Information Technology (IIIT) has been established as a PPP with TCS and Ceinsys (erstwhile ADCC Infocad) as industry partners in 2016. A Government College of Engineering started in the academic year 2016-17. National Fire Service College, under the Ministry of Home Affairs is also located in the city which was established in the year 1957.

Nagpur has two major law schools, Maharashtra National Law University, a National Law University established in 2016 and Department of Law, Nagpur University. Further many private law colleges, mostly affiliated to RTMNU, also offer legal education in the city.

Nagpur has two major management institutes, Indian Institute of Management (IIM) established in 2015 and Institute of Management Technology (IMT), private management college, established in 2004. College of Agriculture is an old college in the city and was one of the first five agriculture colleges in the country founded in 1906 by the then British Government.

Nagpur also has other centrally funded institutes like National Power Training Institute, Central Institute for Cotton Research, Central Institute of Mining and Fuel Research, Central Power Research Institute, National Academy of Direct Taxes, National Civil Defence College, National Research Centre for Citrus, Petroleum and Explosives Safety Organisation, Rajiv Gandhi National Institute of Intellectual Property Management, Jawaharlal Nehru Aluminium Research Development and Design Centre (JNARDDC), National Institute of Miners’ Health (NIMH), National Disaster Response Force Academy, National Academy of Defence Production and National Environmental Engineering Research Institute.

Nagpur also has an IGNOU and YCMOU regional centre.

== Media ==
Lokmat Marathi-language newspaper published in Maharashtra, India. Founded in 1971 by Jawaharlal Darda, it is the largest read Marathi-language newspaper in India. and has presence in print, digital, TV and events. The Hitavada is the largest selling broadsheet English daily newspaper of Central India. It was founded in 1911 by freedom fighter Gopal Krishna Gokhale in Nagpur. Other English dailies circulated in the city include The Times of India, The Indian Express, The Economic Times and Lokmat Times. Marathi dailies circulated in city are Nava Rashtra, Sakal, Tarun Bharat, Deshonatti, Maharashtra Times, Punya Nagari, Lokshahi, Divya Marathi and Loksatta. Hindi newspapers such as Nava Bharat, Dainik Bhaskar and Lokmat Samachar are also circulated. Employment News, which is published weekly, is also circulated in Hindi, English and Urdu. Online news portal such as Nagpur Today and The Live Nagpur are also available with special focus on local news.

All India Radio is the oldest radio broadcaster in the city and has its office in the Civil Lines area. Vividh Bharati, the entertainment radio station, and Gyan Vani, the educational radio station, are the FM radio stations of All India Radio and are available in the frequency 100.6 FM & 107.8 FM, respectively. Other private FM broadcasting channels with their frequencies include Radio City at 91.1 FM, Red FM at 93.5 FM, My FM at 94.3 FM, Radio Mirchi at 98.3 FM, Mirchi Love FM at 91.9 FM and Big FM at 92.7 FM.

Television broadcasting in Nagpur began on 15 August 1982 with the launch of Doordarshan, the Government of India's public service broadcaster. It transmits DD National and DD News, which are free-to-air terrestrial television channels and one regional satellite channel called DD Sahyadri. Private satellite channels started in the 1990s. Lord Buddha TV and Awaaz India TV are Free-to-air television which are based in the city and are available in various cable operators and DTH platforms Satellite TV channels are accessible via cable subscription, direct-broadcast satellite services or internet-based television. Cable TV operators or multi system operators in the city include UCN, GTPL, In Cable, BCN and Diamond Cable Network. All the DTH operators in the country are available in the city viz. Airtel digital TV, DD Free Dish, Dish TV, Sun Direct, D2h and Tata Play.The city also has its own Regional DTH operator, UCN, which serves the Vidarbha region of Maharashtra headquartered in the city itself.

Broadband Internet service is available in the city and is provided by various Internet service providers. Wi-Fi is available in major educational institutions and certain areas in the city, including government institutions under Smart City plan by NSSCDCL. As of 2026, 4G services in the city are provided by Airtel, Jio, Vodafone Idea Limited and BSNL. and 5G services in the city are provided by Airtel, Jio and Vodafone Idea Limited

== Sports ==
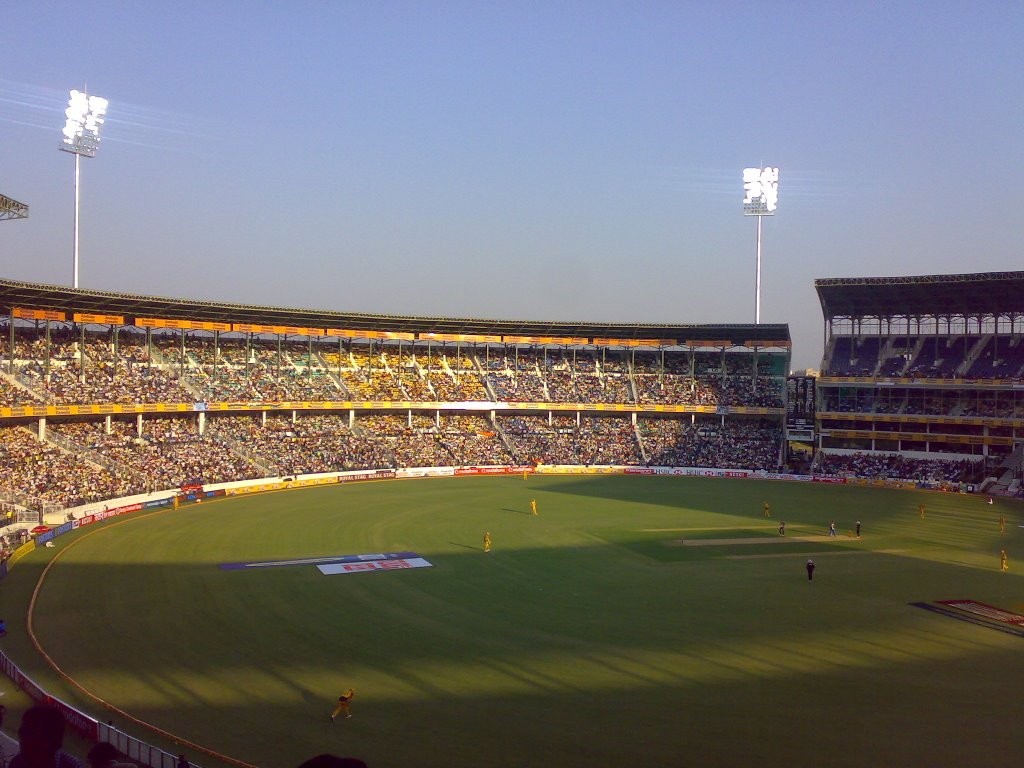
Vidarbha Cricket Association stadium, Nagpur

Nagpur is a big centre for cricket in Vidarbha owing to the presence of the Vidarbha Cricket Association. Vidarbha Cricket Association (VCA) is the governing body of cricket activities in the Vidarbha region in Maharashtra. It is affiliated to the Board of Control for Cricket in India. Nagpur is one of the few Indian cities that has more than one international cricket stadium, the older one being the Vidarbha Cricket Association Ground situated in Civil Lines, and the new one, the Vidarbha Cricket Association Stadium, inaugurated in 2008 is situated in Jamtha, Wardha Road on the outskirts of the city.

Vidarbha Cricket Association Stadium has been built on Wardha road with a seating capacity of 45,000 people at a cost of ₹750 million (US$7.8 million). It is one of the fifteen test cricket venues in the country. Vidarbha Cricket Association Ground has been the venue for the 1987 Reliance World Cup and 1996 Wills World Cup. Vidarbha Cricket Association Stadium has been the venue for the 2011 Cricket World Cup and 2016 ICC World Twenty20. The stadium also hosts certain matches of the Indian Premier League and had been the home city for the now defunct Deccan Chargers in the 2010 season and was also the home city for Kings XI Punjab along with Mohali in the 2016 season. Vidarbha Cricket Association also has a cricket academy at the main centre in Vidarbha Cricket Association Ground and three more centres. It also has its own cricket teams which play in various formats as mandated by BCCI. The Vidarbha cricket team had won the Ranji Trophy and Irani Cup consecutively in 2017–18 and 2018–19 season.

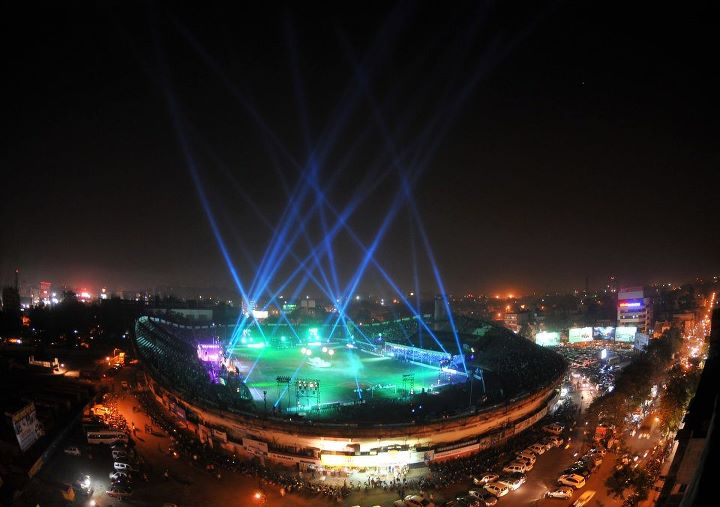
A view at NPL starting ceremony

Vidarbha Hockey Association is a body governing field hockey in the Vidarbha Region and is affiliated to Hockey India as an associate member. Vidarbha Hockey Association Stadium is the hockey ground owned and managed by Vidarbha Hockey Association.

Nagpur District Football Association(NDFA) is the district governing body for football in Nagpur, Maharashtra and is affiliated with the Western India Football Association, the state sports governing body. The Nagpur District Football Association is a district level football body and conducts various matches among the schools and clubs. It has its own league. NDFA Elite division Champions League, another football tournament, was held at Nagpur annually since 2010 until 2014 by Lokmat Group in Yeshwant Stadium. Indian Friends Football Club (IFFC), Rabbani, Rahul CLub and Young Muslim Football Club (YMFC) are notable football clubs in the city. Other clubs include, Rabbani Club, Rahul Club, City Police, South East Central Railway, Qidwai Club, SRPF, New Globe and City Club. Nagpur FC has its own Football Academy in Dhanwate National College, Congress Nagar. Slum Soccer is a social initiative started by Vijay Barse for young runaways and former drug addicts to rehabilitate them through football.

Badminton tournaments in the city are organised by Nagpur District Badminton Association (NDBA) which is affiliated to Maharashtra Badminton Association which in turn is a member of Badminton Association of India. Nagpur District Table Tennis Association organises table tennis tournaments at district level and is affiliated to Maharashtra Table Tennis Association. The city also has a divisional sports complex which consist of Indoor stadium and other gymnastic facilities.

The city's major indoor arena is Vivekananda Nagar Indoor Sports Complex located near Mankapur. The arena hosts several political events, concerts and sports events like badminton, basketball, lawn tennis.

The city also has various running events, for general public, organised by various institutions.

== Sister cities ==
- Jinan (China)

== See also ==
- MIHAN
- Nagpur Metro
- Nagpur District
- Make in Maharashtra
- List of Maratha dynasties and states
- List of forts
- Largest Indian cities by GDP
