= Climate change in London =

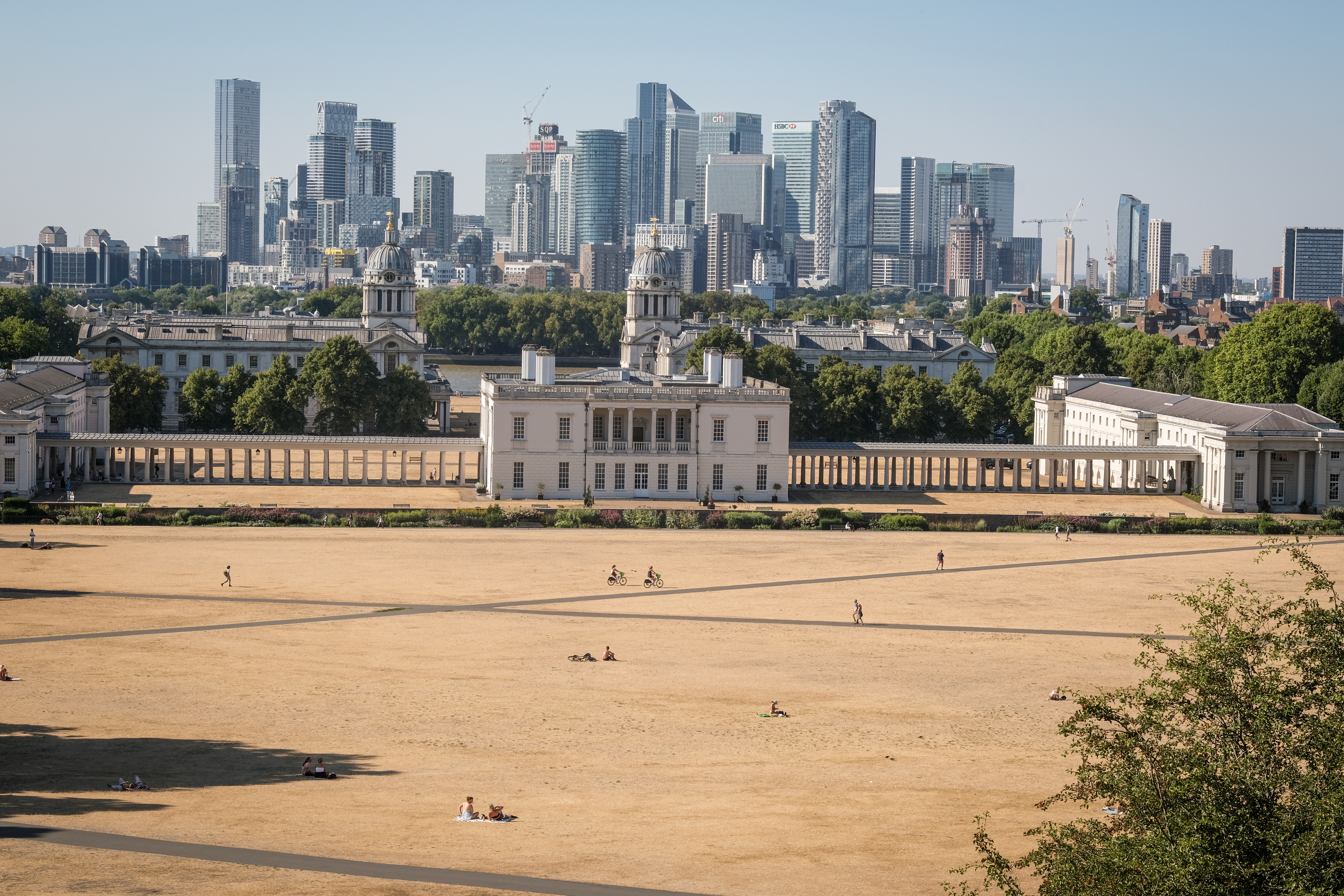
Greenwich Park during the 2022 United Kingdom heatwave.

Climate change in Greater London affects various environments and industries, including agriculture.

== Greenhouse gas emissions ==
In 2022, London's emissions amounted to 28.40 million tonnes.

== Impacts of climate change ==
=== Thames Barrier ===
The Thames Barrier would need to be half a metre taller to deal with rising sea levels.

=== Weather extremes ===
Weather extremes, including wildfires and flooding would become more frequent across London.

== Response ==
=== Policies ===
As Mayor of London, Sadiq Khan committed to London reaching net zero emissions by 2030.

==== London low emission zone ====
The London Low Emission Zone is an area of London in which an emissions standard based charge is applied to non-compliant commercial vehicles. Its aim is to reduce the exhaust emissions of diesel-powered vehicles in London. This scheme should not be confused with the Ultra Low Emission Zone (ULEZ), introduced in April 2019, which applies to all vehicles. Vehicles that do not conform to various emission standards are charged; the others may enter the controlled zone free of charge. The low emission zone started operating on 4 February 2008 with phased introduction of an increasingly stricter regime until 3 January 2012. The scheme is administered by the Transport for London executive agency within the Greater London Authority.

==== London Climate Change Agency ====
The London Climate Change Agency Limited, was a municipal company owned by the London Development Agency (LDA) that worked in partnership with private sector companies (notably EDF Energy) to design, finance, construct, own and operate decentralised low energy and zero-carbon projects for London, as well as providing services to others. It operated in the areas of energy, water, waste and transport. In 2009 it was integrated into the London Development Agency.

The Agency was launched on 20 June 2005 to implement a manifesto commitment by Ken Livingstone in the 2004 elections for the Mayor of London. Its budget for 2006–07 was £815,000, 63% of which was funded directly by the LDA. The Chief Executive Officer was Allan Jones, who previously led the development of the pioneering sustainable community energy system in Woking. The London Climate Change Agency plans to create a similar system for London.

As of 2006, London produced 7% of the UK's carbon emissions. The LCCA was seen as one of the key vehicles for delivering the Mayor's energy strategy, which targets cuts in these emissions of 20% by 2010 and 60% by 2050 (although achieving the first of these targets was unlikely). The Agency was also expected to play a role in ensuring that the 2012 Summer Olympics in London were the first to be powered by low carbon technology.

In 2007 the LCCA received planning permission for a number of renewable energy installations including: solar photovoltaic cells at City Hall, the UK's first combined photovoltaic and wind turbine system at the Palestra building, Blackfriars Road

==== Ultra Low Emissions Zone ====
The Ultra Low Emission Zone (ULEZ) is an area where an emissions standard based charge is applied to non-compliant road vehicles. Plans were announced by London Mayor Boris Johnson in 2015 for the zone to come into operation in 2020. Sadiq Khan, the subsequent mayor, introduced the zone early in 2019. The zone initially covered Central London, the same area as the existing London congestion charge; in 2021, Khan extended the zone to cover the area within the North Circular and South Circular roads. In 2023 it was further extended to all of Greater London, covering over 1,500 square kilometres (580 sq mi) and approximately 9 million people.

==== Superloop ====
The Superloop is an express bus network in London, England, that forms part of the London Buses network and connects Outer London town centres, railway stations and transport hubs.

During the 2024 London mayoral election, Mayor of London Sadiq Khan proposed an additional 10 Superloop routes across London, as well as an express bus route via Old Kent Road prior to construction of the Bakerloo line extension taking place.

Proposals for an expansion, Superloop 2, with routes BL1, SL11 and SL12 were announced in January 2025.

== See also ==
- Climate change in the United Kingdom
- Climate change and cities
