= Climate change and cities =

Jakarta was listed as the most vulnerable city to climate change in a 2021 Verisk Maplecroft study.

Climate change and cities are deeply connected. Cities are one of the greatest contributors and likely best opportunities for addressing climate change. Cities are also one of the most vulnerable parts of the human society to the effects of climate change, and likely one of the most important solutions for reducing the environmental impact of humans. The UN projects that 68% of the world population will live in urban areas by 2050. In the year 2016, 31 mega-cities reported having at least 10 million in their population, 8 of which surpassed 20 million people. However, secondary cities - small to medium size cities (500,000 to 1 million) are rapidly increasing in number and are some of the fastest growing urbanizing areas in the world further contributing to climate change impacts. Cities have a significant influence on construction and transportation—two of the key contributors to global warming emissions. Moreover, because of processes that create climate conflict and climate refugees, city areas are expected to grow during the next several decades, stressing infrastructure and concentrating more impoverished peoples in cities.

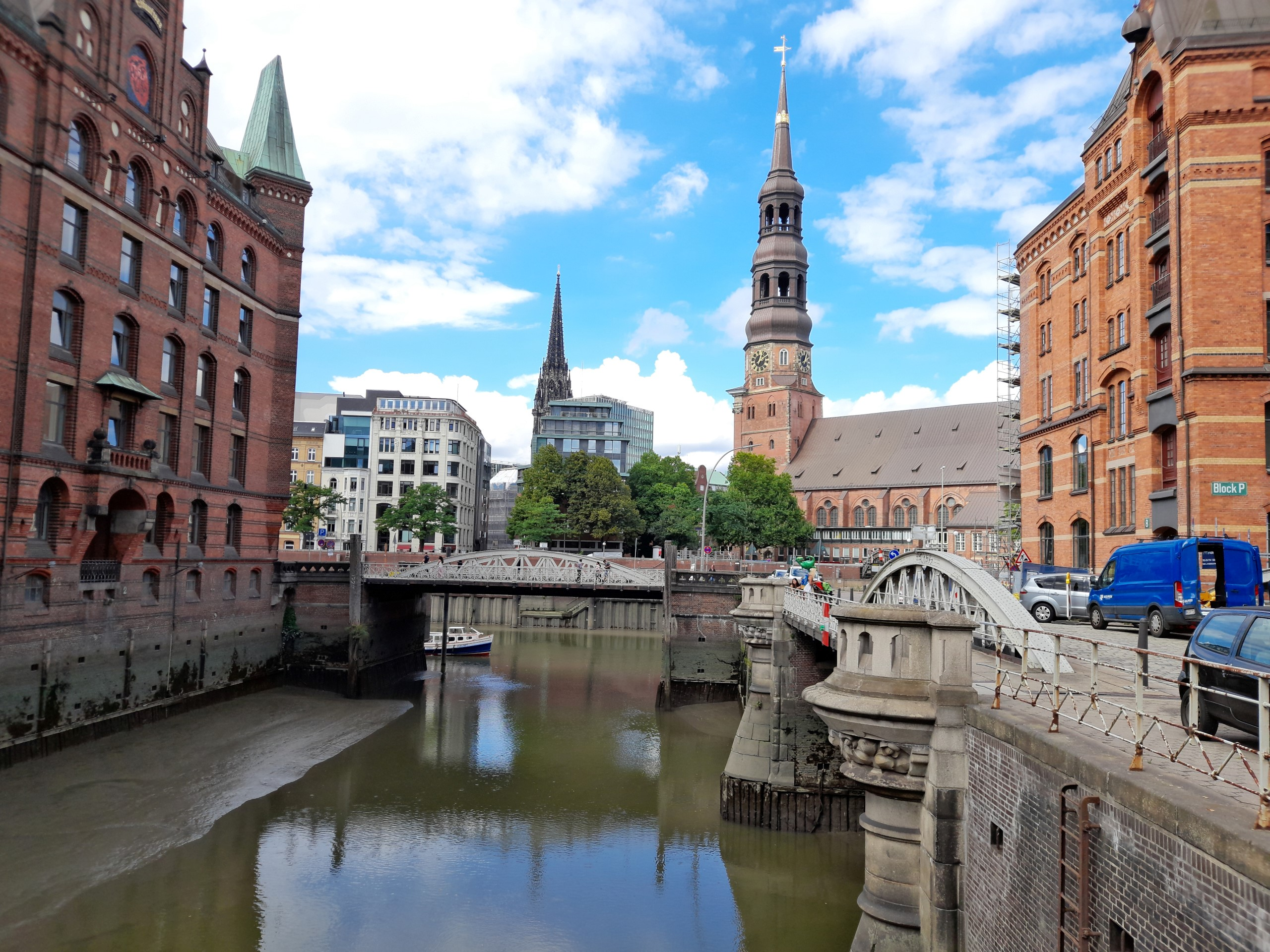
Hamburg, Germany, is a large city that has experienced multiple droughts throughout the years, which has led to decreased economic productivity.

High density and urban heat island effect are examples of weather changes that impact cities due to climate change. It also causes exacerbating existing problems such as air pollution, water scarcity, and heat illness in metropolitan areas. Moreover, because most cities have been built on rivers or coastal areas, cities are frequently vulnerable to the subsequent effects of sea level rise, which cause flooding and erosion; these effects are also connected with other urban environmental problems, such as subsidence and aquifer depletion.

A report by the C40 Cities Climate Leadership Group described consumption based emissions as having significantly more impact than production-based emissions within cities. The report estimates that 85% of the emissions associated with goods within a city is generated outside of that city. Climate change adaptation and mitigation investments in cities will be important in reducing the impacts of some of the largest contributors of greenhouse gas emissions: for example, increased density allows for redistribution of land use for agriculture and reforestation, improving transportation efficiencies, and greening construction (largely due to cement's outsized role in climate change and improvements in sustainable construction practices and weatherization).

== Climate change and urbanization ==
In the most recent past, increasing urbanization has also been proposed as a phenomenon that has a reducing effect on the global rate of carbon emission primarily because with urbanization comes technical prowess which can help drive sustainability. Lists of high impact climate change solutions tend to include city-focused solutions; for example, Project Drawdown recommends several major urban investments, including improved bicycle infrastructure, building retrofitting, district heating, public transit, and walkable cities as important solutions.

In order to activate and focus attention on climate change solutions, the international community has formed coalitions of cities such as C40 Cities Climate Leadership Group and ICLEI) as well as policy goals, Sustainable Development Goal 11 ("sustainable cities and communities”). Currently, in 2022, there is a deterioration in the progress of the goal. There is limited progress on making cities and human settlements more appropriate to live in Sub-Saharan Africa, Latin America and the Caribbean and the Pacific Island countries. There is fair progress in Central and Southern Asia and Eastern and South-Eastern Asian. However, it has been achieved in Developed countries.

There is an ongoing paradigm shift in urban planning that is focused on development of climate friendly and resilience by using climate urbanism. Climate urbanism aims to protect physical and digital infrastructures of urban economies from the hazards associated with climate change. Being that cities bring in 80% of the world's revenue, it is important for the infrastructure and planning of these urban areas to be planned out using carbon management and climate resilient infrastructure.

== Background ==
More than half of the world's population is in cities, consuming a large portion of food and goods produced outside of cities. The UN projects that 68% of the world population will live in urban areas by 2050. In the year 2016, 31 mega-cities reported having at least 10 million in their population, 8 of which surpassed 20 million people. However, secondary cities - small to medium size cities (500,000 to 1 million) are rapidly increasing in number and are some of the fastest growing urbanizing areas in the world further contributing to climate change impacts.

== Emissions ==
Cities globally house half of the world's people, consume 80% of the world's energy and 70% of its natural resources, and contribute more than 70% of global CO_{2} emissions. Cities and regions are also particularly vulnerable to climate-related hazards and pollution. Climate danger and pollution also disproportionately affect the poor, increasing inequality. With half of the world population residing in urban areas, there will be an increase in energy usage that comes with Climate Change. One of these will be AC, since climate change comes with higher temperatures many people will start needed more cooling systems, so this results in more air conditioning and newer models of cooling systems. Although more people are living in cities which can result in shortages, cities actually emit less carbon than rural areas since house sizes are smaller, more gas heat over propane is used, less carbon fueled transportation is used, and more people share communal spaces such as laundry rooms and kitchens. While cities create some problems, it is important to realize that the denser population creates less carbon emissions which benefits climate change. New policies now focus on the reduction of emissions from coal-fired power plants as well as increasing motor vehicle efficiency.

With regard to methods of emissions counting cities can be challenging as production of goods and services within their territory can be related either to domestic consumption or exports. Conversely the citizens also consume imported goods and services. A recent study discovered that 40% of strategies focus on reducing emissions from municipal operations that account for 1–5% of total urban emissions, while neglecting imported goods and industrial activities. To avoid double counting in any emissions calculation it should be made clear where the emissions are to be counted: at the site of production or consumption. This may be complicated given long production chains in a globalized economy. Moreover, the embodied energy and consequences of large-scale raw material extraction required for renewable energy systems and electric vehicle batteries is likely to represent its own complications – local emissions at the site of utilization are likely to be very small but life-cycle emissions can still be significant.

== Field of study ==
The research perspective of cities and climate change, started in the 1990s as the international community became increasingly aware of the potential impacts of climate change. Urban studies scholars Michael Hebbert and Vladmir Jankovic argue that this field of research grew out of a larger body of research on the effects of urban development and living on the environment starting as early as the 1950s. Since then, research has indicated relationships between climate change and sustainable urbanization: increase employment cities reduces poverty and increases efficiencies.

Two international assessments have been published by the Urban Climate Change Research Network at The Earth Institute at Columbia University. The first of which was published in, the first of which (ARC3.1) was published in 2011, and the second of which (ARC3.2) was published in 2018. These papers act as summaries of the scholarship for the field similar to the Intergovernmental Panel on Climate Change reports. A third report is to be published between 2023 and 2025.

=== Cities as laboratories ===
Cities are good subjects for study because they can invest heavily in large-scale experimental policies that could be scaled elsewhere (such as San Diego's advanced urban planning practices which could be applied elsewhere in the United States). Multiple scholars approach this in different ways, but describe this "urban laboratory" environment good for testing a wide variety of practices. For example, the book Life After Carbon documents a number of cities which act as "urban climate innovation laboratories". These cities as laboratories offer an efficient way to detect climate change by looking at the effects of the greenhouse effect on rooftops, street trees, and other environmental variables within a city setting. Though this method of looking at the heat waves effects in cities, it will offer a way of seeing the problem of the effect of heat that will be solved by cities within the future.

=== Health impacts ===
Climate change has been observed to have caused impact on human health and livelihoods in urban settings. Urbanization commonly occurs in cities with low and middle income communities that have high population density and a lack of understanding of how climate change, which degrades their environment, is affecting their health. Within urban settings, multiple climate and non-climate hazards impact cities which magnify the damages done to human health. For example, heatwaves have intensified in cities due to the combination of multiple factors adding to climate change. With heatwaves constantly increasing temperatures in cities, it has caused many heat-related illnesses such as heat stroke or heat cramps. The rise of temperatures due to climate change have also changed the distribution of diseases from mosquitoes, causing a rising rate of infectious diseases. Alongside infectious diseases and heatwaves, climate change can create natural hazards such as floods, droughts, and storms due to rising sea levels. It also harms those even more who have COVID-19, asthma, illnesses, etc. Hospitals and other healthcare places are also a big contributor to climate change with them being responsible for 4-5% global carbon dioxide emissions. They are due to medications, such as asthma inhalers, anesthetic gasses, patient and staff transportation, electricity, HVAC, and waste management. The impacts on human health in urban settings is more profound in economically and socially marginalized urban residents. Low-income and remote populations are more vulnerable to physical hazards, undernutrition, diarrheal and other infectious diseases, and the health consequences of displacement. Urban neighborhoods burdened by heat islands and other climate change problems can also experience clusters of violence, amplifying intersecting vulnerabilities in these communities.

== Urban resilience ==
The Intergovernmental Panel on Climate Change (IPCC) defines resilience as "the ability of a social or ecological system to absorb disturbances while retaining the same basic structure and ways of functioning, the capacity of self-organization, and the capacity to adapt to stress and change." One of the most important notions emphasized in urban resiliency theory is the need for urban systems to increase their capacity to absorb environmental disturbances. By focusing on three generalizable elements of the resiliency movement, Tyler and Moench's urban resiliency framework serves as a model that can be implemented for local planning on an international scale.

The first element of urban climate resiliency focuses on 'systems' or the physical infrastructure embedded in urban systems. A critical concern of urban resiliency is linked to the idea of maintaining support systems that in turn enable the networks of provisioning and exchange for populations in urban areas. These systems concern both physical infrastructure in the city and ecosystems within or surrounding the urban center; while working to provide essential services like food production, flood control, or runoff management. For example, city electricity, a necessity of urban life, depends on the performance of generators, grids, and distant reservoirs. The failure of these core systems jeopardizes human well-being in these urban areas, with that being said, it is crucial to maintain them in the face of impending environmental disturbances. Societies need to build resiliency into these systems in order to achieve such a feat. Resilient systems work to "ensure that functionality is retained and can be re-instated through system linkages" despite some failures or operational disturbances. Ensuring the functionality of these important systems is achieved through instilling and maintaining flexibility in the presence of a "safe failure." Resilient systems achieve flexibility by making sure that key functions are distributed in a way that they would not all be affected by a given event at one time, what is often referred to as spatial diversity, and has multiple methods for meeting a given need, what is often referred to as functional diversity. The presence of safe failures also plays a critical role in maintaining these systems, which work by absorbing sudden shocks that may even exceed design thresholds. Environmental disturbances are certainly expected to challenge the dexterity of these systems, so the presence of safe failures almost certainly appears to be a necessity.

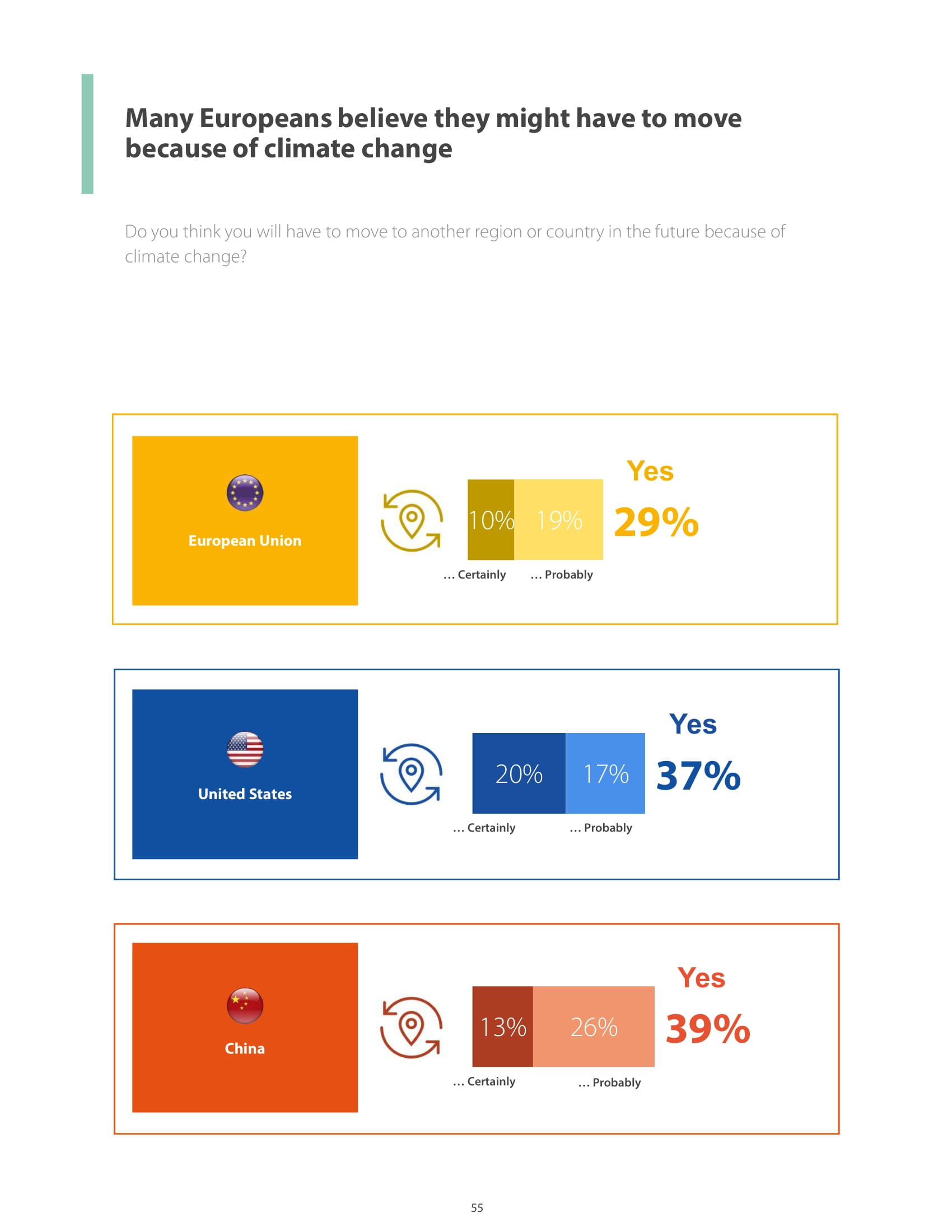
Many European respondents to a survey on climate believe they might have to move regions or countries because of climate change.

Further, another important component of these systems is bounce-back ability. In the instance where dangerous climatic events affect these urban centers, recovering or "bouncing-back" is of great importance. In fact, in most disaster studies, urban resilience is often defined as "the capacity of a city to rebound from destruction." This idea of bounce-back for urban systems is also engrained in governmental literature of the same topic. For example, the former government's first Intelligence and Security Coordinator of the United Kingdom described urban resilience as "the capacity to absorb shocks and to bounce back into functioning shape, or at the least, sufficient resilience to prevent...system collapse." Keeping these quotations in mind, bounce-back discourse has been and should continue to be an important part of urban climate resiliency framework. Other theorists have critiqued this idea of bounce-back, citing this as privileging the status quo, rather advocating the notion of 'bouncing forward', permitting system evolution and improvement.

The next element of urban climate resiliency focuses on the social agents (also described as social actors) present in urban centers. Many of these agents depend on the urban centers for their very existence, so they share a common interest of working towards protecting and maintaining their urban surroundings. Agents in urban centers have the capacity to deliberate and rationally make decisions, which plays an important role in climate resiliency theory. One cannot overlook the role of local governments and community organizations, which will be forced to make key decisions with regards to organizing and delivering key services and plans for combating the impending effects of climate change. Perhaps most importantly, these social agents must increase their capacities with regards to the notions of "resourcefulness and responsiveness. Responsiveness refers to the capacity of social actors and groups to organize and re-organize, as well as the ability to anticipate and plan for disruptive events. Resourcefulness refers to the capacity of social actors in urban centers to mobilize varying assets and resources in order to take action. Urban centers will be able to better fend for themselves in the heat of climatic disturbances when responsiveness and resourcefulness is collectively achieved in an effective manner.

== Regional and national differences ==
Cities in different parts of the world face different, unique challenges and opportunities in the face of climate change. However, one linking factor is their inevitable adherence to "Dominant global patterns of urbanization and industrialization" which often catalyzes "large-scale modification of the drivers for hydrologic and biogeochemical processes". Urbanization and industrialization patterns are particularly evident for regions such as Asia, Africa, and South America, regions that are currently understood as experiencing related rapid shifts in population and economic prowess. Beginning in the 2020s, a number of cities worldwide began creating Chief Heat Officer positions to organize and manage work counteracting the urban heat island effect.

=== Africa ===
Africa is urbanizing faster than any other continent, and it is estimated that by 2030, more than one billion Africans will live in cities. This rapid urbanization, coupled with the many interlinked and complex challenges as a result of climate change, pose a significant barrier to Africa's sustainable development. Much of this Urban Development is informal, with urban residents settling in informal settlements and slums often on the outskirts of cities. This phenomenon suggests that lower-income countries should be targeted in initiatives to increase infrastructural sustainability. A recent study found that in "countries with per capita incomes of below USD 15,000 per year (at PPP-adjusted 2011 USD) carbon pricing has, on average, progressive distributional effects" and that "carbon pricing tends to be regressive in countries with relatively higher income," indicating that carbon taxing and shifting carbon prices might incentivize governments to shift to green energy as the baseline energy consumption method for developing peri-urban areas. Although urbanization is seen in a positive light, the effects of it can be negative on those being urbanized. African cities are exposed to multiple climate threats including floods, drought, water stress, sea level rise, heat waves, storms and cyclones, and the related effects of food insecurity and disease outbreaks like cholera and malaria from floods and droughts.

Climate impacts in rural areas, such as desertification, biodiversity loss, soil erosion and declines in agricultural productivity, are also driving rural-urban migration of poor rural communities to cities. To achieve sustainable development and climate resilience in cities in Africa, and elsewhere, it is important to consider these urban-rural interlinkages. Increasing attention is being paid to the important role of peri-urban areas in urban climate resilience, particularly regarding the ecosystem services that these areas provide and which are rapidly deteriorating in Sub-Saharan Africa. Peri-urban ecosystems can provide functions such as controlling floods, reducing the urban heat island effect, purifying air and water, supporting food and water security, and managing waste.

=== Asia ===
==== China ====
China currently has one of the fastest-growing industrial economies in the world, and the effects of this rapid urbanization have not been without climate change implications. The country is one of the largest by land area, and so the most prominent region regarding urbanization is the Yangtze River Delta, or YRD, as it is considered "China's most developed, dynamic, densely populated and concentrated industrial area" and is allegedly "growing into an influential world-class metropolitan area and playing an important role in China's economic and social development". In this way urbanization in China could be understood as intimately related to not only the functionality of their economic system, but the society therein; something that makes climate change mitigation an intersectional issue concerning more than simply infrastructure.

The data show that "[h]igh-administrative-level cities had stronger adaptation, lower vulnerability, and higher readiness than ordinary prefecture-level cities." China's large-scale population migration to the Yangtze River Delta and agglomeration due to rapid urbanization, and blind expansion in the construction of eastern coastal cities due to population pressure is even more unfavorable for urban climate governance.

Historically, data has shown that "climate change has been shaping the Delta and its socio-economic development" and that such socio-economic development in the region "has shaped its geography and built environment, which, however, are not adaptable to future climate change". Thus, it has been stated that "It is imperative to adopt policies and programs to mitigate and adapt to climate change" in the YRD, specifically, policies that are aimed at reducing the impact of particular climate threats based on the YRD's geography. This includes the region's current infrastructure in the mitigation of flood disasters and promotion of efficient energy usage at the local level.

A national-level policy analysis done on the drylands of northern China presents the notion of "sustainable urban landscape planning (SULP)" that specifically aims to "avoid occupying important natural habitats and corridors, prime croplands, and floodplains". The research indicates that adopting SULPs moving into the future can "effectively manage the impacts of climate change on water resource capacity and reduce water stress" not only within the northern China experimental model but for "drylands around the world".

==== South Asia ====
South Asia's urban population grew by 130 million between 2001 and 2011—more than the entire population of Japan—and is poised to rise by almost 250 million by 2030. But, urbanization in South Asia is characterized by higher poverty, slums, pollution and crowding and congestion. At least 130 million South Asians—more than the entire population of Mexico—live in informal urban settlements characterized by poor construction, insecure tenure and underserviced plots. Despite being a water-rich zone, climate projection models suggest that by 2050, between 52 and 146 million people living in South Asia could face increased water scarcity due to climate change, accounting for 18% of the global population exposed to water scarcity. Urban water access is particularly critical in South Asia as it remains home to more than 40% of the world's poor (living on less than US$1.25 per day) and 35% of the world's undernourished. A study done of selected Himalayan cities in India and Nepal found that none of them have a robust system of water planning and governance to tackle the water challenges emerging from rapid urbanization and climate change. Indias urbanization is characterized by informal settlements or slums, which lack basic amenities and are oftentimes hazardous areas such as floodplains or steep slopes. Khulna, Bangladesh is also facing issues as well. As sea levels begin to rise, due to climate change, salinity will move inwards, reducing the amount of safe drinking water available to the people of Khulna. There are plans being put in place to make the quality of water in cities better, but this decreases the availability to those in the informal urban areas. As of now they rely on using on as little water as possible, specifically for their crops.

=== North and South America ===
==== Brazil ====
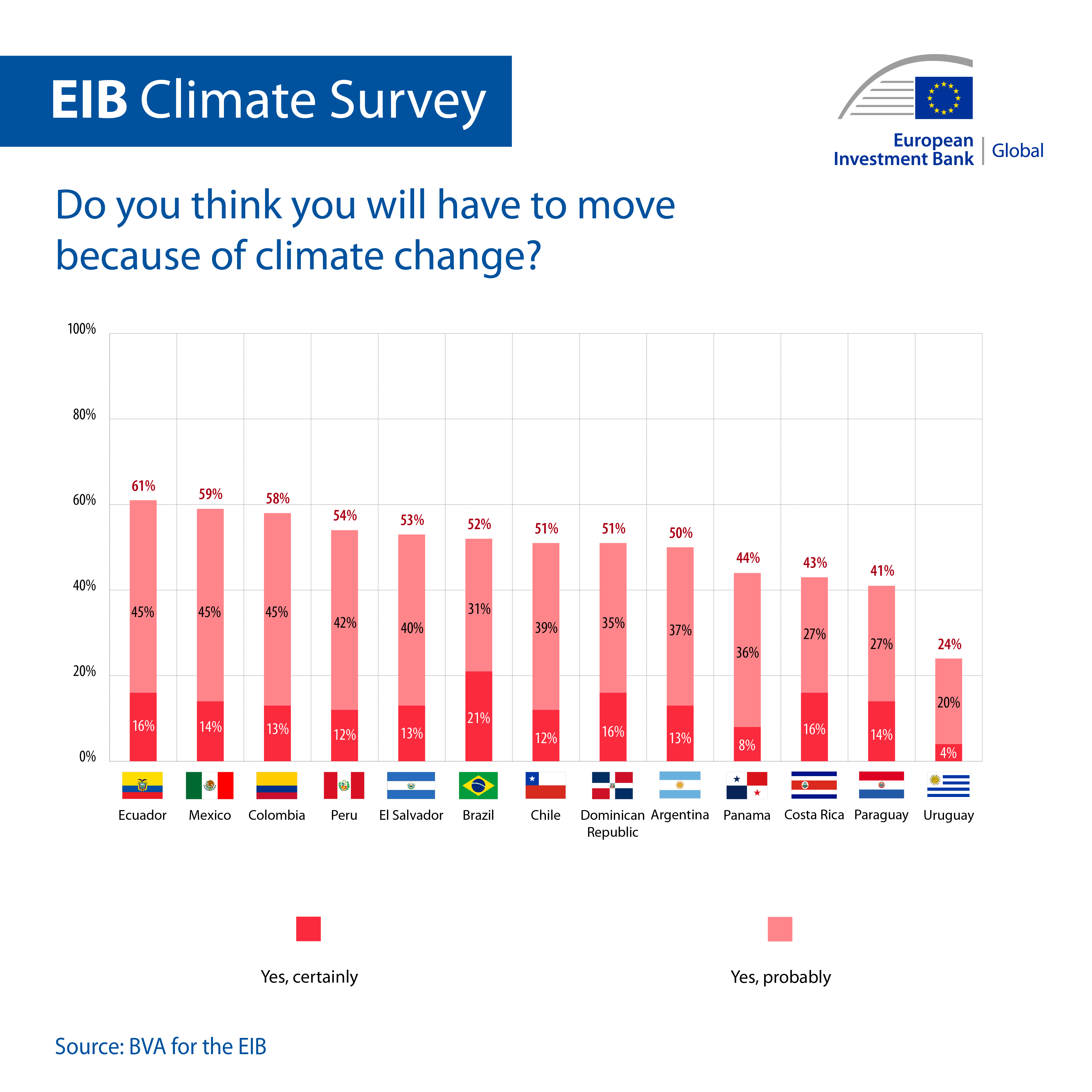
People in Brazil, Mexico, Ecuador, and other countries feel that they will have to move because of the effects of climate change.

Areas of South America were also cited in recent studies that highlight the dangers of urbanization on both local and transnational climates, and for a country like Brazil, one of the highest populated nations in the world as well as the majority holder of the Amazon rainforest. The United Nations Development Programme highlights the Amazon rainforest as serving a "key function in the global climate systems," granted its profound usefulness in capturing CO_{2} emissions. UN research has indicated that because of Brazil's climate being so intimately reliant on the health of the rainforest, deforestation measures are currently seen as having adverse effects on the rainforest's "natural adaptive capacities" towards extreme climate shifts, thus predisposing Brazil to what are expected to be increased volatility in temperature and rainfall patterns. More specifically, it is expected that if global warming continues on its current path without vast mitigation strategies being put in place, what is currently predicted to be an average 2 °C increase in temperature at the global scale could look like a 4 °C within Brazil and the surrounding Amazon region. Rapid urbanization in other countries will also result in higher need for resources. This includes resources that will cause further deforestation of the Amazon Rainforest to obtain. This will inevitably create a lot more climate issues, as we continue to lose more trees in the Amazon rainforest.

Issues of climate change in Brazil do not start and end at what has already been done with regards to urbanization; it is very much an issue rooted in socioeconomic contexts. Factor analysis and multilevel regression models sponsored by the U.S. Forest Service revealed that for all of Brazil, "income inequality significantly predicts higher levels of a key component of vulnerability in urban Brazilian municipalities" to flood hazards.

The future of Brazil's effect of climate is likely to change since though its NDC Brazil has made the commitment to lower their greenhouse gas emissions by 37% below their 2005 levels by 2025. This will likely serve as a challenge within the cities of Brazil since 86% of the whole countries population lives in the urban areas, and this is likely to increase to 92% by 2050. As for deforestation, since Brazil is home to the Amazon rainforest, Brazil has always had a high deforestation rate. Brazil's deforestation was at a high in 2004 with having 27.77 thousand kilometers of forest being destroyed, having a low in 2012 with only 4.57 thousand kilometers of forest being destroyed, and since then it has been back on the incline with 10.85 thousand kilometers of forest being destroyed.

==== United States ====
The United States, as one of the largest industrialized nations in the world, also has issues regarding infrastructural insufficiencies linked to climate change. Take a study of Las Vegas topology as an indicator. Research that created three land use/land cover maps, or LULC maps, of Las Vegas in 1900 (albeit hypothetical), 1992, and 2006 found that "urbanization in Las Vegas produces a classic urban heat island (UHI) at night but a minor cooling trend during the day". In addition to temperature changes in the city, "increased surface roughness" caused by the addition of skyscrapers/closely packed buildings in its own way were found "to have a mechanical effect of slowing down the climatological wind Windfield over the urban area". Cities in the United States that are heavily industrialized, such as Los Angeles, are responsible for a large number of greenhouse emissions due to the amount of transportation needed for millions of people living in one city. Such unnatural environmental phenomena furthers the notion that urbanization has a role in determining local climate, although researchers acknowledge that more studies need to be conducted in the field.

Cities play an important role in investing in climate innovation in the United States. Often local climate policies in cities, preempt larger policies pursued by the states or federal government. For example, following the United States withdrawal from the Paris Agreement a coalition of cities, under the banner of Mayors National Climate Action Agenda. A 2020 study of US cities found that 45 of the 100 largest cities in the U.S. had made commitments by 2017, which led to a reduction of 6% of U.S. emissions by 2020.

===== Clean Air Act =====
Since the Clean Air Act's passing in 1963 as a landmark piece of legislation aimed at controlling air quality at the national level, research has indicated that "the mean wet deposition flux... has decreased in the U.S. over time" since its enactment. Even then, however, the same research indicated that measurements in the amounts of chemical pollutants contaminating rain, snow, and fog "follows an exponential probability density function at all sites". Such a finding suggests that alleged variability in rainfall patterns is the likely driving factor for the study's seemingly promising results, as opposed to there being a clear significance stemming from the policy change. It is within this context that while beneficial, the Clean Air Act alone cannot stand as the only firm rationale for climate policies in the United States moving forward.

===== Mayors National Climate Action Agenda =====
Mayors National Climate Action Agenda, or Climate Mayors, is an association of United States mayors with the stated goal of reducing greenhouse gas emissions. Founded by Los Angeles mayor Eric Garcetti, former Houston mayor Annise Parker, and former Philadelphia mayor Michael Nutter, the group represents 435 cities and nearly 20% of the U.S. population.

Founded in 2014, the organization received one million dollars in start-up funding from the Clinton Global Initiative to support the founding mayors' efforts to organize cities in advance of the signing of the 2015 Paris Agreement.

The organization has stated its commitment to upholding the emissions goals of the Paris Agreement on climate change even if the United States withdraws from the agreement.

== International policy ==
Several major international communities of cities and policies have been formed to include more cities in climate action.

=== C40 ===
C40 Cities Climate Leadership Group is a group of 96 cities that represents more than ten percent of the world's population and 23 percent of the global economy. Created and led by cities, C40 is focused on fighting the climate crisis and driving urban action that reduces greenhouse gas emissions and climate risks, while increasing the health, wellbeing and economic opportunities of urban residents.

From 2023, Mayor of London, Sadiq Khan and Mayor of Freetown, Yvonne Aki-Sawyerr serve as C40's Co-Chair, former mayor of New York City Michael Bloomberg as Board President, and Mark Watts as Executive Director. All four work closely with the 13-member steering committee, the Board of Directors and professional staff. The rotating steering committee of C40 mayors provides strategic direction and governance. Steering committee members include: London, Freetown, Melbourne, Jakarta, Abidjan, Phoenix, Medellin, Copenhagen, Nairobi, Tokyo, Curitiba, Boston, Milan, Seoul, Oslo and Hong Kong.

Working across multiple sectors and initiative areas, C40 convenes networks of cities providing a suite of services in support of their efforts, including: direct technical assistance; facilitation of peer-to-peer exchange; and research, knowledge sharing & communications. C40 is also positioning cities as a leading force for climate action around the world, defining and amplifying their call to national governments for greater support and autonomy in creating a sustainable future.

=== SDG 11: Sustainable cities and communities ===
Sustainable Development Goal 11 (SDG 11 or Global Goal 11), titled "sustainable cities and communities", is one of 17 Sustainable Development Goals established by the United Nations General Assembly in 2015. The official mission of SDG 11 is to "Make cities inclusive, safe, resilient and sustainable". The 17 SDGs take into account that action in one area will affect outcomes in other areas as well, and that development must balance social, economic and environmental sustainability.

SDG 11 has 10 targets to be achieved, and this is being measured with 15 indicators. The seven outcome targets include safe and affordable housing, affordable and sustainable transport systems, inclusive and sustainable urbanization, protection of the world's cultural and natural heritage, reduction of the adverse effects of natural disasters, reduction of the environmental impacts of cities and to provide access to safe and inclusive green and public spaces. The three means of implementation targets include strong national and regional development planning, implementing policies for inclusion, resource efficiency, and disaster risk reduction in supporting the least developed countries in sustainable and resilient building.

4.3 billion people — 55% of the world's population — currently live in cities globally. It is projected that 68% of all people will live in cities by 2050. Cities across the world occupy just 3 percent of the Earth's land, yet account for 60–80 percent of energy consumption and 75 percent of carbon emissions. There are serious challenges for the viability and safety of cities to meet increased future demands.

=== Global Covenant of Mayors for Climate and Energy ===
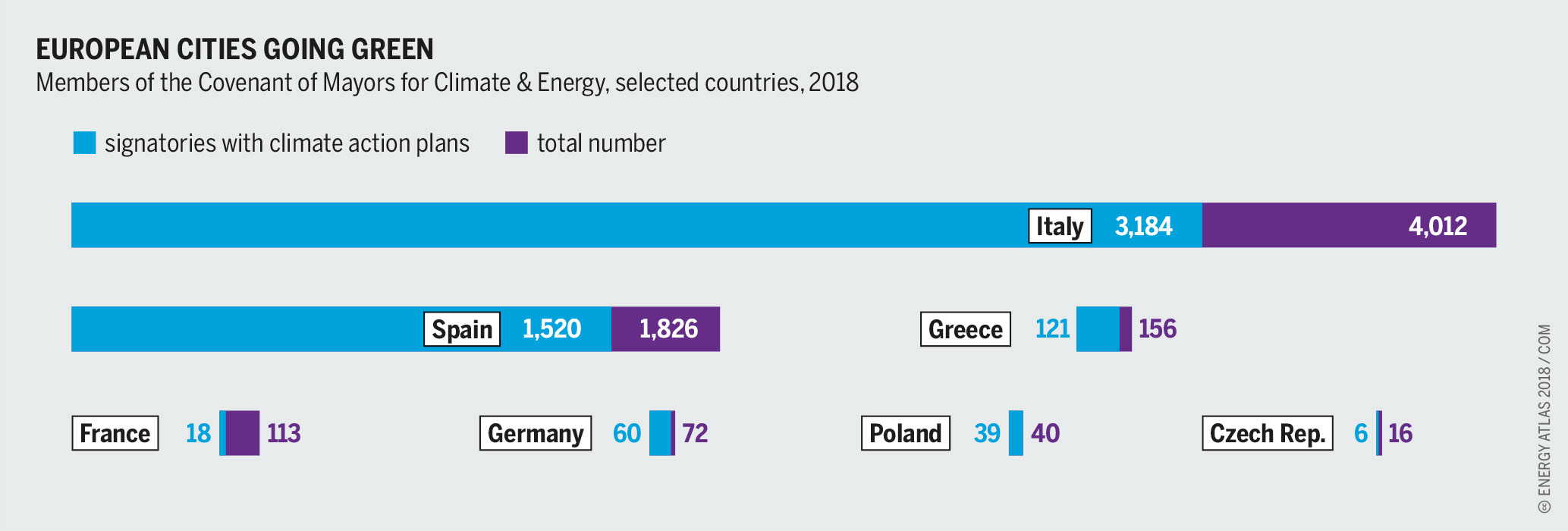
European cities going green

The Global Covenant of Mayors for Climate & Energy (GCoM) was established in 2016 by bringing formally together the Compact of Mayors and the European Union's Covenant of Mayors. It is a global coalition of city leaders addressing climate change by pledging to cut greenhouse gas emissions and prepare for the future impacts of climate change. The Compact highlights cities' climate impact while measuring their relative risk levels and carbon pollution. The Compact of Mayors seeks to show the importance of city climate action, both at the local level and around the world. The Compact was launched in 2014 by UN Secretary General Ban Ki-moon and former New York City Mayor Michael Bloomberg, the UN Special Envoy for Cities and Climate Change. The Compact represents a common effort from global city networks C40 Cities Climate Leadership Group (C40), ICLEI, and United Cities and Local Governments (UCLG), as well as UN-Habitat, to unite against climate change. 12,500 cities and local governments have committed to the Compact of Mayors. These cities hail from 6 continents and 144 countries. In total, they represent more than 1 billion people.

== See also ==
- List of most-polluted cities by particulate matter concentration
- Climate change in New York City
- Climate change in Washington, D.C.
- Climate change in Australia by city
- Climate change in London
- Urban green space
- Zero-carbon city
