= Sustainable Development Goal 11 =

11th of 17 Sustainable Development Goals for sustainable cities

- Mission statement: "Make cities and human settlements inclusive, safe, resilient, and sustainable"
- Commercial?: No
- Type of project: Non-profit
- Location: Global
- Founder: United Nations
- Established: 2015
- Website: sdgs.un.org

Sustainable Development Goal 11 (SDG 11 or Global Goal 11), titled "sustainable cities and communities", is one of 17 Sustainable Development Goals established by the United Nations General Assembly in 2015. The official mission of SDG 11 is to "Make cities inclusive, safe, resilient and sustainable". The 17 SDGs take into account that action in one area will affect outcomes in other areas as well, and that development must balance social, economic and environmental sustainability.

SDG 11 has 10 targets to be achieved, and this is being measured with 15 indicators. The seven outcome targets include safe and affordable housing, affordable and sustainable transport systems, inclusive and sustainable urbanization, protection of the world's cultural and natural heritage, reduction of the adverse effects of natural disasters, reduction of the environmental impacts of cities and to provide access to safe and inclusive green and public spaces. The three means of implementation targets include strong national and regional development planning, implementing policies for inclusion, resource efficiency, and disaster risk reduction in supporting the least developed countries in sustainable and resilient building.

4.3 billion people — 55% of the world's population — currently live in cities globally. It is projected that 68% of all people will live in cities by 2050. Cities across the world occupy just 3 percent of the Earth's land, yet account for 60–80 percent of energy consumption and 75 percent of carbon emissions. There are serious challenges for the viability and safety of cities to meet increased future demands.

== Background ==
SDG 11 addresses slums, human settlement management and planning, climate change mitigation and adaptation, and urban economies. Prior to the adoption of the 2030 Agenda, Millennium Development Goal 7, target 4, called for efforts to achieve a "significant improvement in the lives of at least 100 million slum dwellers" by 2020.

There has been a rapid growth of mega-cities, especially in the developing world: "In 1990, there were ten mega-cities with 10 million inhabitants or more, and in 2014, there were 28 mega-cities, home to a total of 453 million people". With regards to slums, data shows that "828 million people live in slums today and most them are found in Eastern and South-Eastern Asia".

SDG 11 represents "a shift in international development cooperation from a focus on poverty as a rural phenomenon to recognizing that cities, especially in the global south, are facing major challenges with extreme poverty, environmental degradation and risks due to climate change and natural disasters".

== Targets, indicators and progress ==
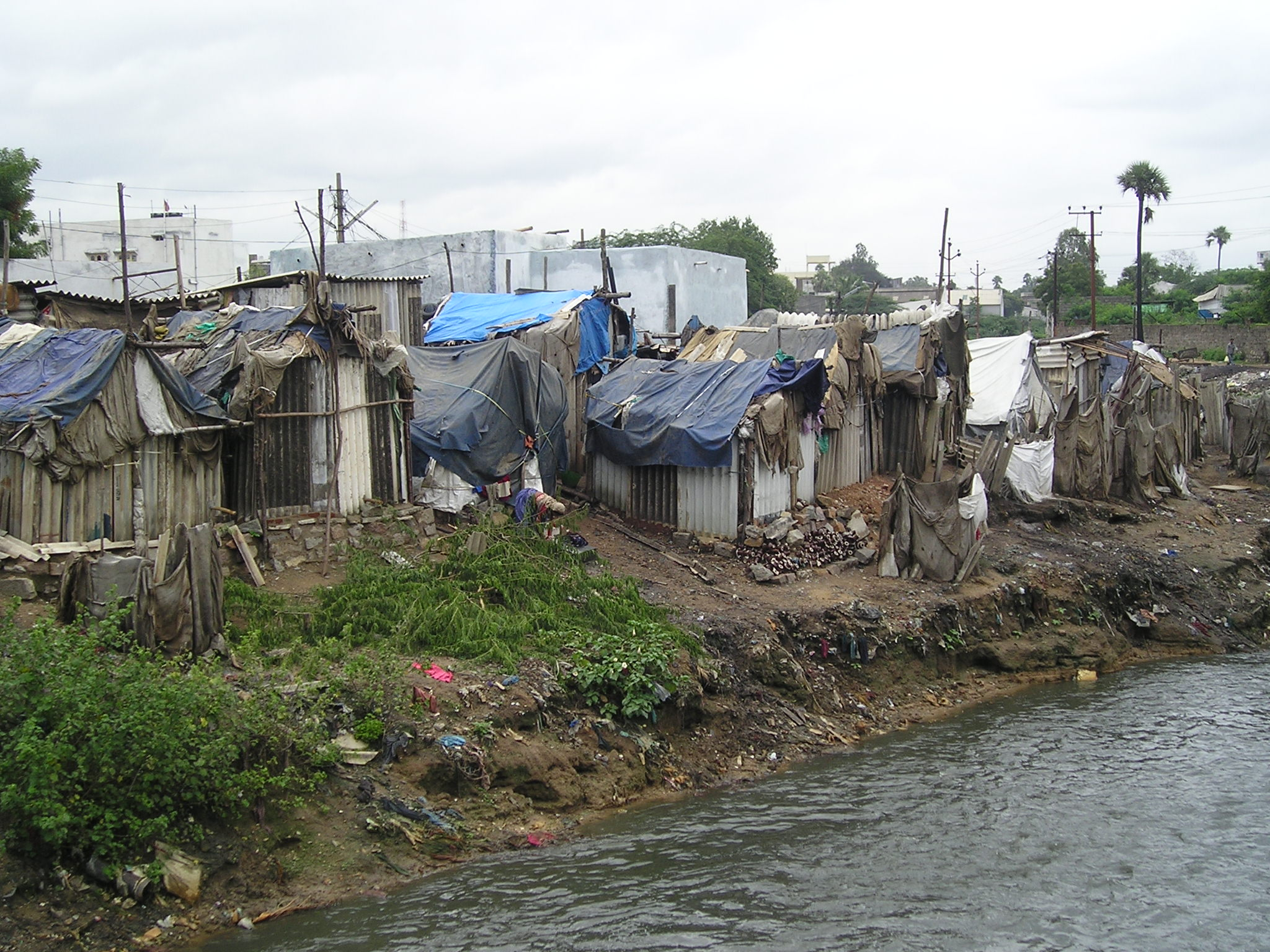
Slums of Hyderabad in India

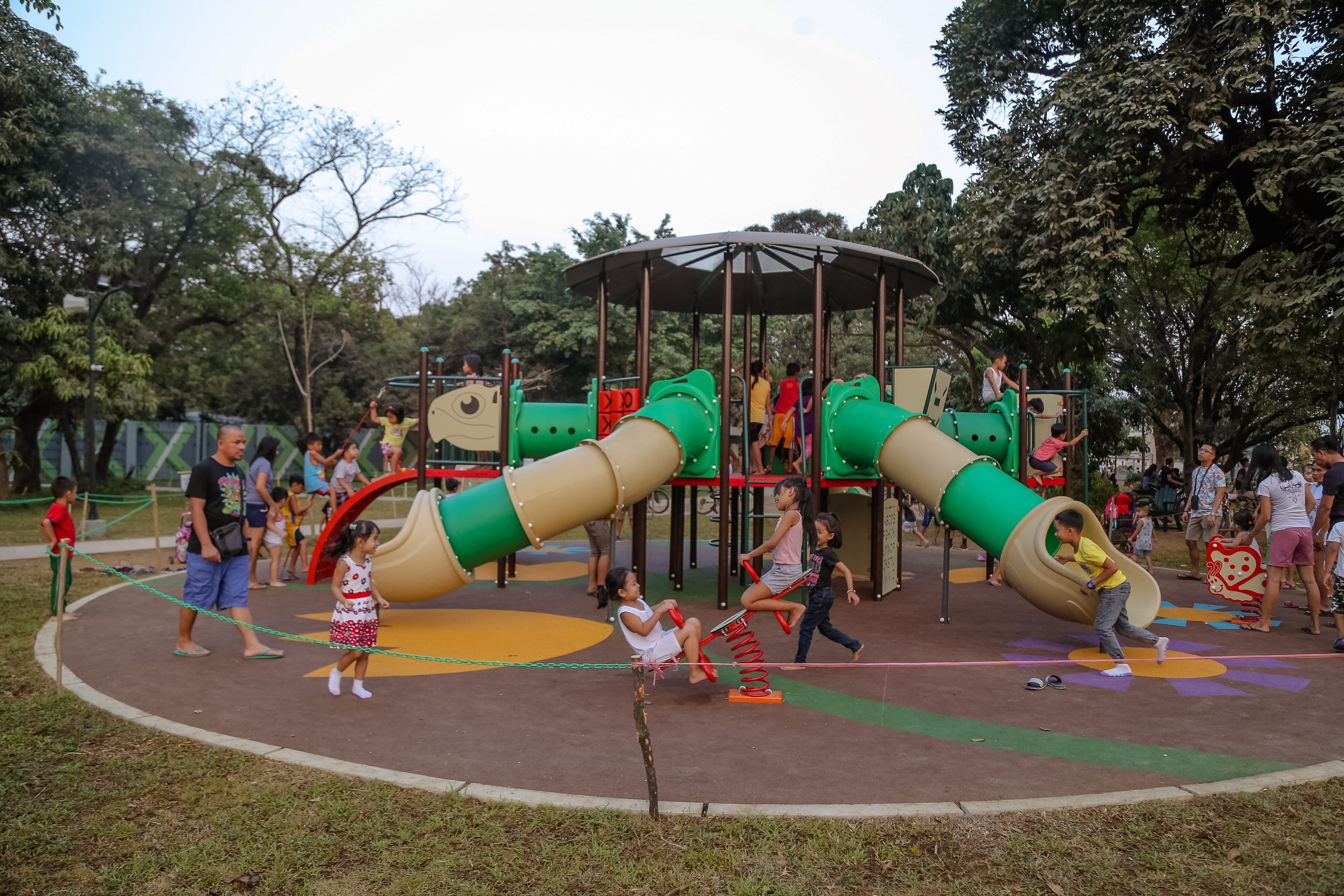
Family Park for kids and families in Valenzuela, Philippines

The UN has defined 10 targets and 15 indicators for SDG 11. Targets specify the goals, and indicators represent the metrics by which the world aims to track whether these targets are achieved. Six of them are to be achieved by the year 2030 and one by the year 2020 and three have no target years. Each of the targets also has one or two indicators which will be used to measure progress.

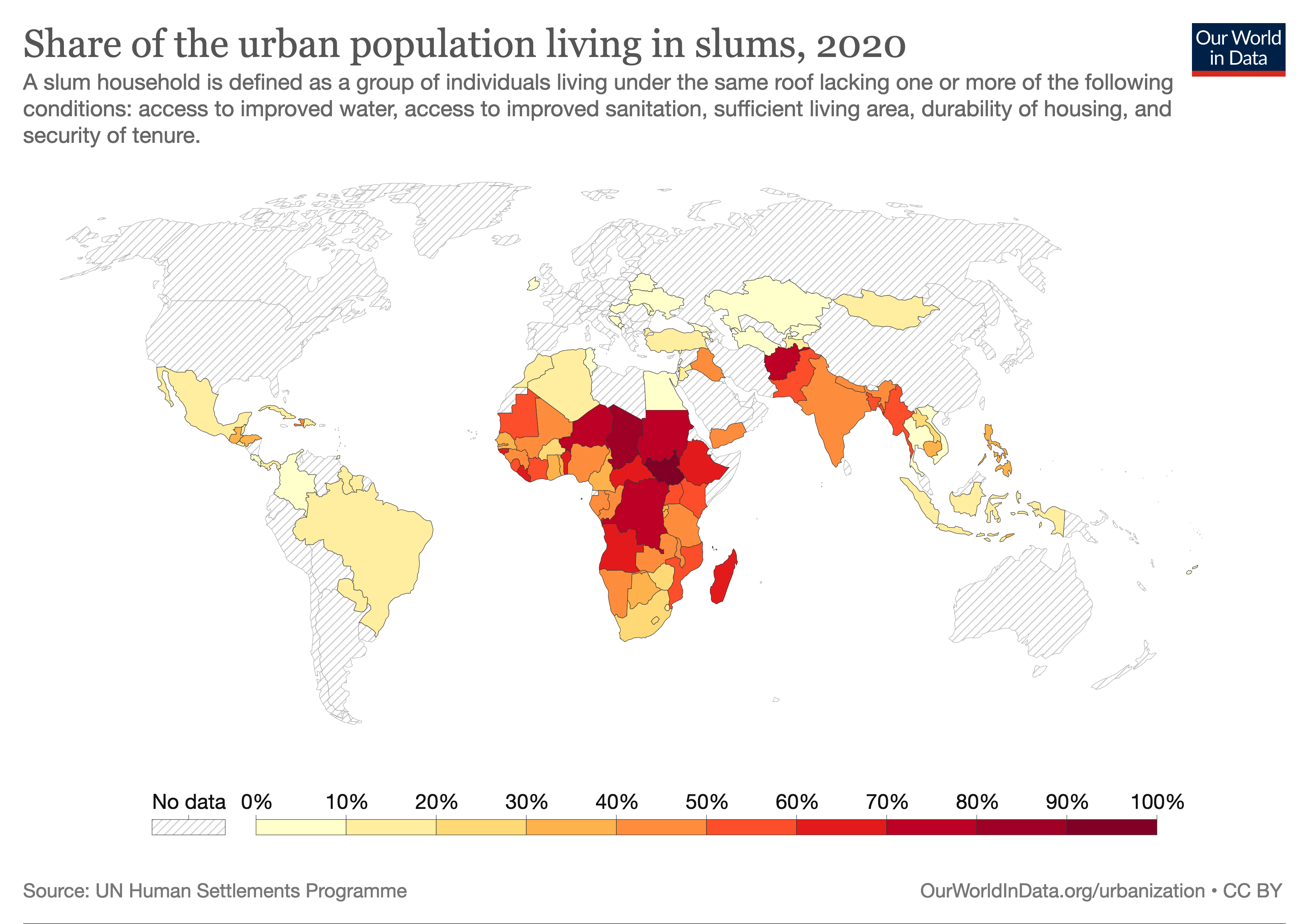
World map for Indicator 11.1.1 in 2014: "Share of people living in slums"

=== Target 11.1: Safe and affordable housing ===
The full title of Target 11.1 is "By 2030, ensure access for all to adequate, safe and affordable housing and basic services and upgrade slums".

This target has one Indicator: Indicator 11.1.1 is the "Proportion of the urban population living in slum households".

People who live in slums have no access to improved water, access to improved sanitation, sufficient living area, and durable housing.

There are currently (in 2022) about 1 billion people living in urban slums.

=== Target 11.2: Affordable and sustainable transport systems ===
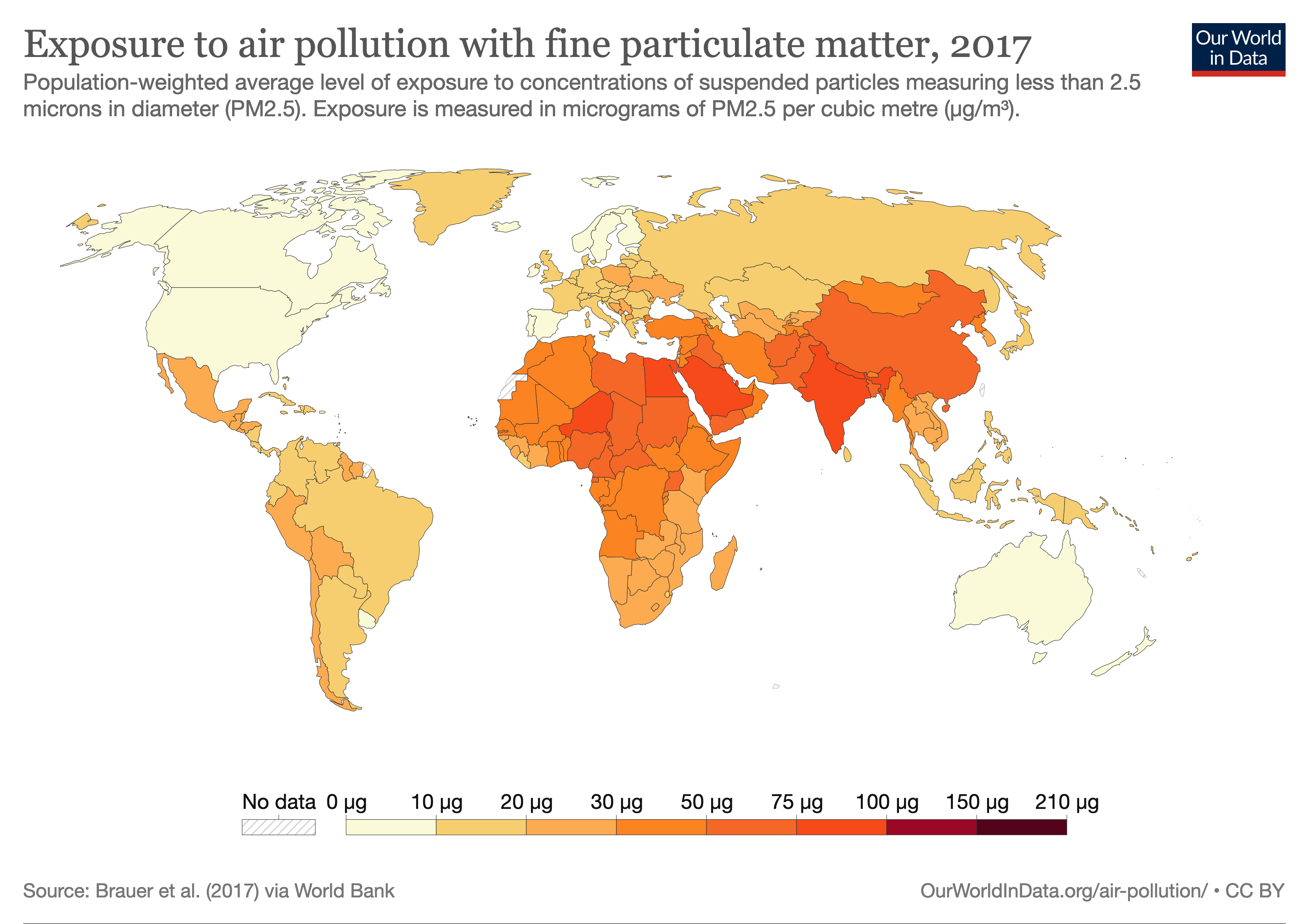
Map for Indicator 11.2 showing the Particulate matter air pollution, 2016

The full text of Target 11.2 is "By 2030, provide access to safe, affordable, accessible and sustainable transport systems for all, improving road safety, notably by expanding public transport, with special attention to the needs of those in vulnerable situations, women, children, persons with disabilities and older persons".

This target has one Indicator: Indicator 11.2.1 is the "Proportion of population that has convenient access to public transport, by sex, age and Persons With Disabilities". Improving transport systems to refine the use of accessibility is key because due to physical or mental disabilities, impaired sight or hearing, carrying heavy bags or traveling with small children, as this causes an average of 25% of the population to experience a degree of reduced mobility.

A sustainable transportation system considers different socioeconomic groups' travel concerns to achieve the validity of accessibility metrics. Transportation and transportation planning should be coordinated with land use planning. Employment and residential areas are relatively concentrated, and urban and suburban settings should be planned and reconstructed in concert.

=== Target 11.3: Inclusive and sustainable urbanization ===
The full-text Target 11.3 is "By 2030, enhance inclusive and sustainable urbanization and capacity for participatory, integrated and sustainable human settlement planning and management in all countries".

The target has two indicators:

- Indicator 11.3.1: "Ratio of land consumption rate to the population growth rate"
- Indicator 11.3.2: "Proportion of cities with a direct participation structure of civil society in urban planning and management that operate regularly and democratically"

Indicator 11.3.2 may be challenging to calculate. There is currently no data available for this indicator.

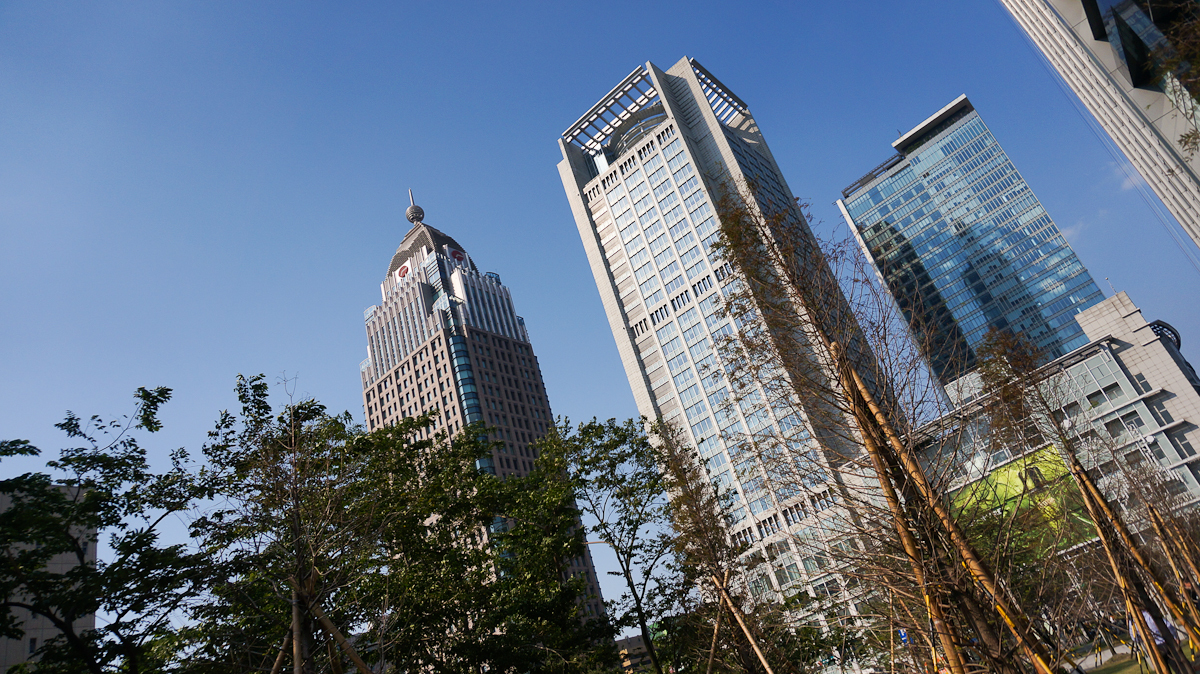
Skyline of skyscrapers in Taipei

=== Target 11.4: Protect the world's cultural and natural heritage ===
The full text of Target 11.4 is "Strengthen efforts to protect and safeguard the world's cultural and natural heritage."

It has one indicator: Indicator 11.4.1 is the "Total per capita expenditure on the preservation, protection and conservation of all cultural and natural heritage, by the source of funding (public, private), type of heritage (cultural, natural) and level of government (national, regional, and local/municipal)".

This indicator is difficult to calculate. There are currently no data available for this indicator.

Due to civil wars, more than half of the In Danger WHSs are located in war zones in Afghanistan, Congo, Iraq, Libya, Mali, Palestine, Syria, and Yemen. The modern era sees never-ending civil wars in several developing countries, acts of vandalism at cultural sites committed by terrorists and warlords, threats to destroy Iranian cultural heritage sites by US President Donald Trump, a change of identity of a WHS (Hagia Sophia) by the Turkish government, deforestation, rapid climate change, out-of-control urbanization, and tourism mismanagement by governments which leads to overtourism and hyper-exploitation of tourism resources. Because these problems exist, this target has become more prominent than ever.

=== Target 11.5: Reduce the adverse effects of natural disasters ===
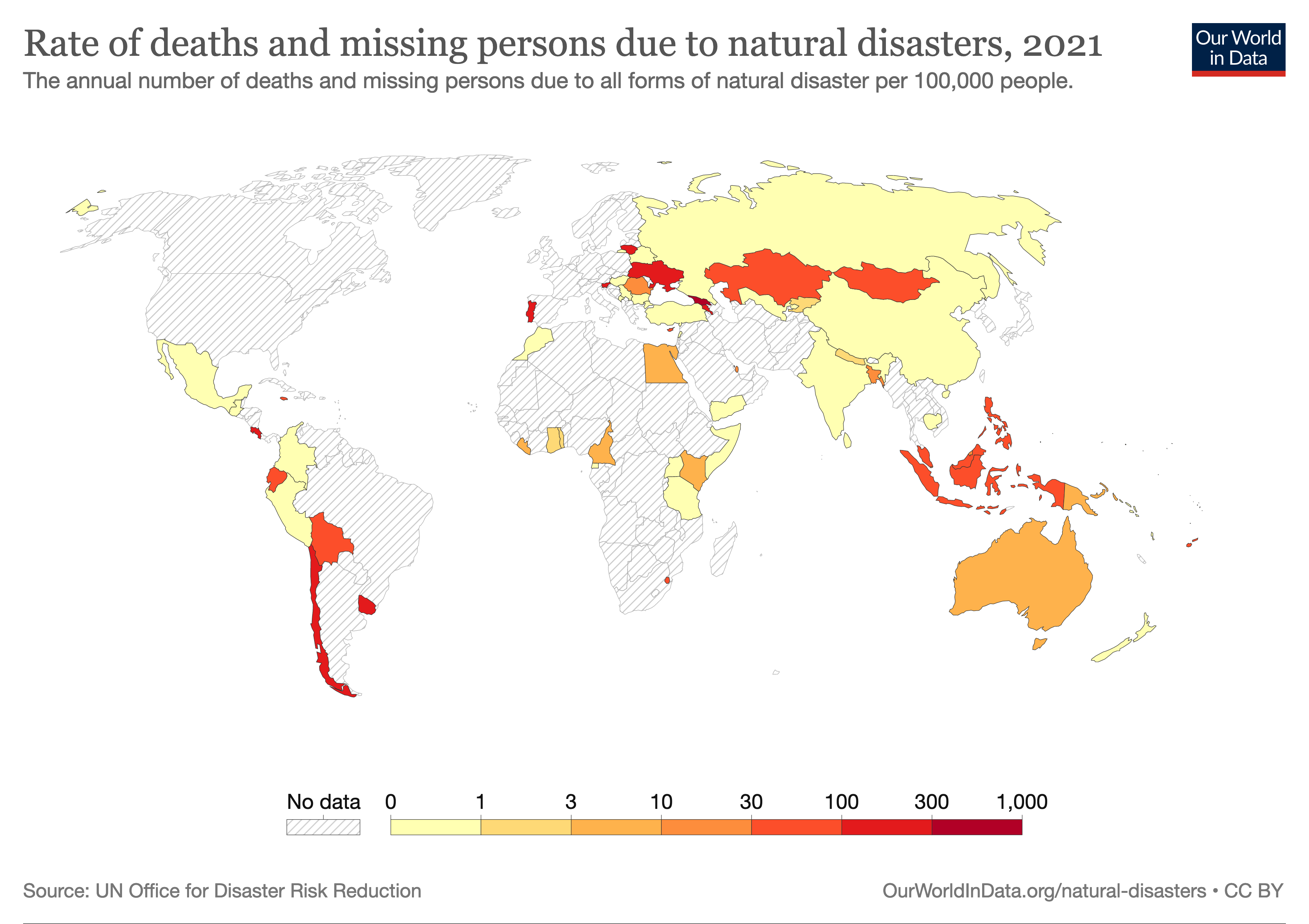
World map for Indicator 11.5.1 in 2017: "Death rate from natural disasters"

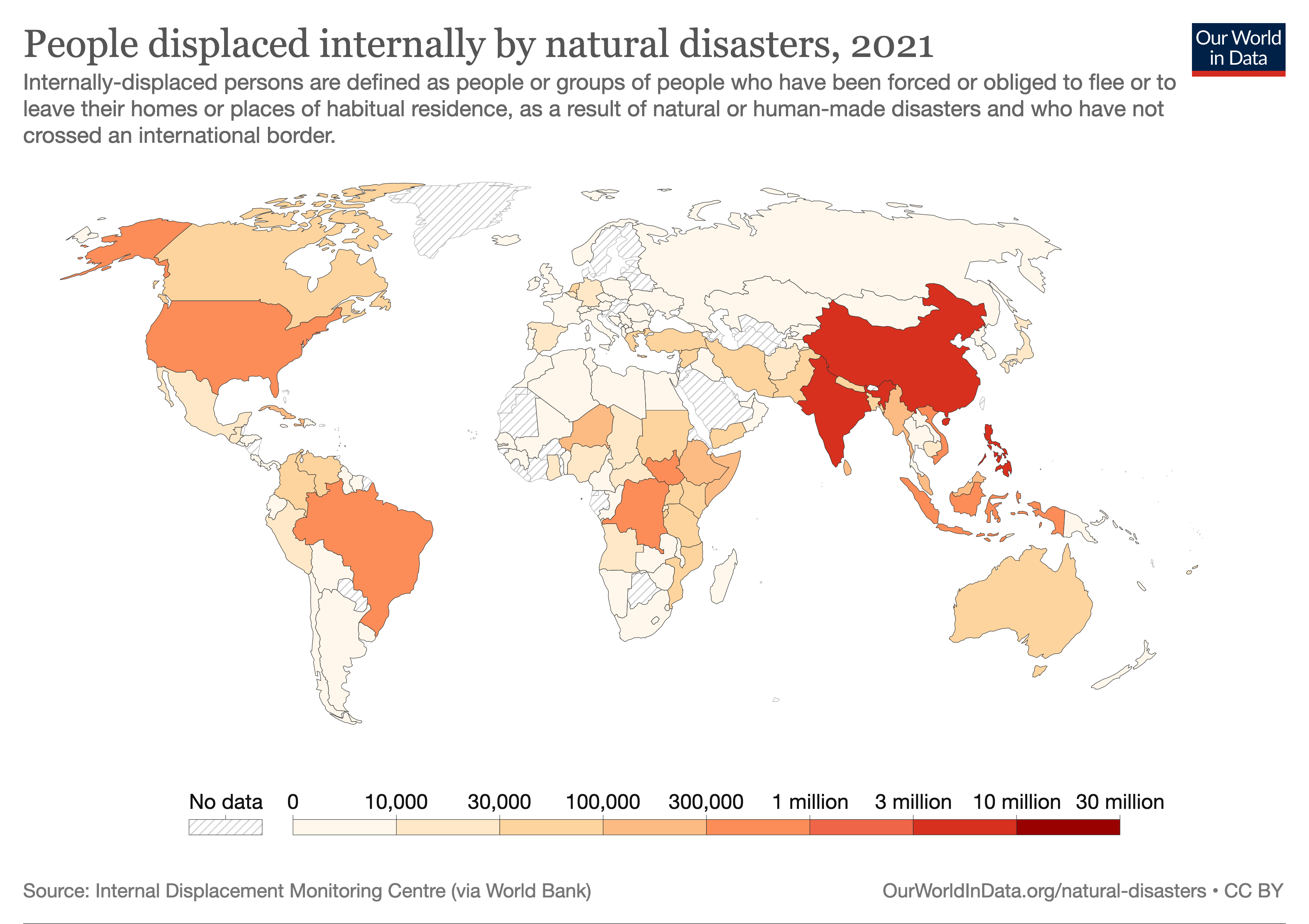
World map for Indicator 11.5.1 in 2017: "Internally displaced persons from natural disasters"

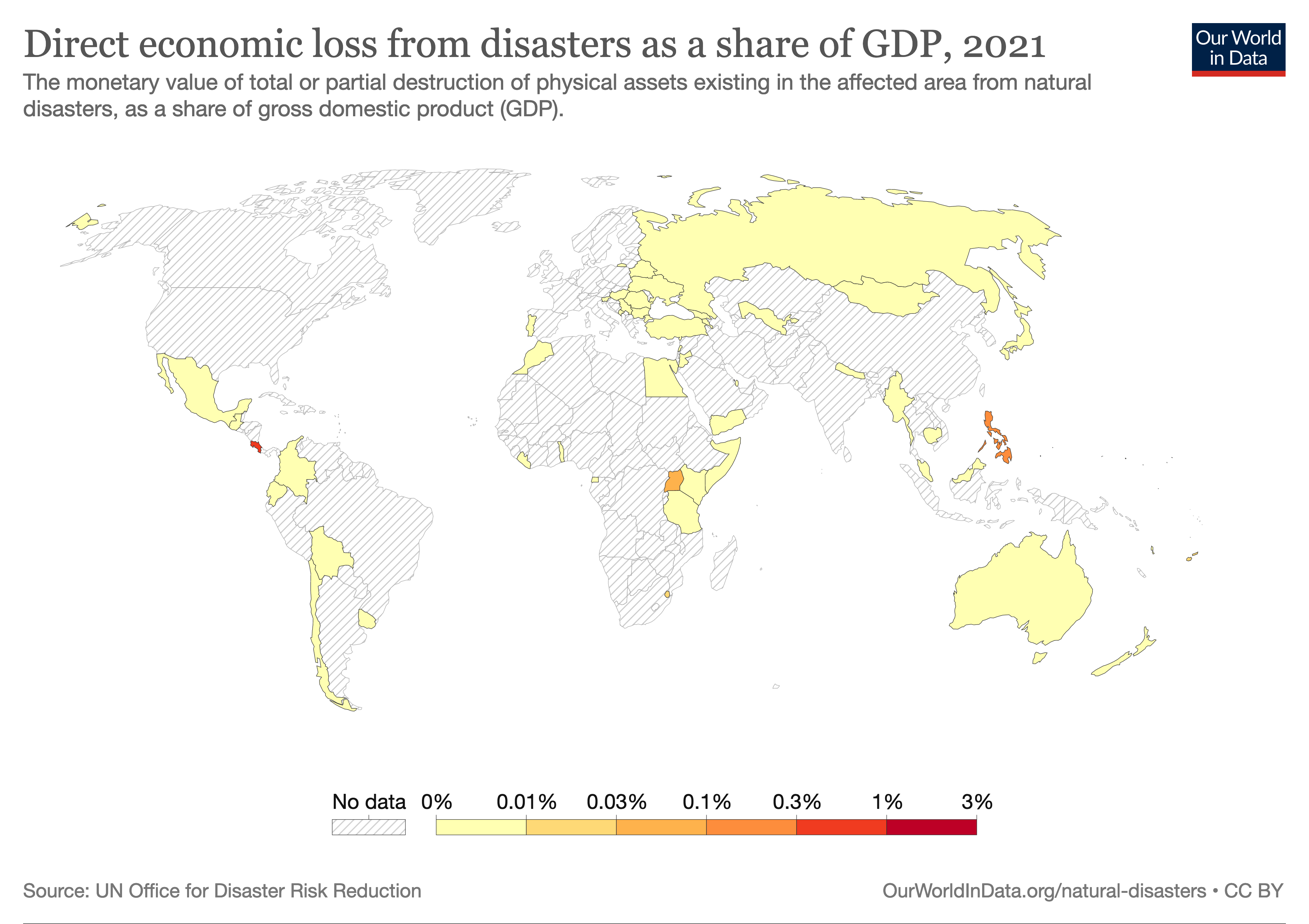
Map for Indicator 11.5.2 showing the Direct disaster economic loss as a share of GDP, 2018

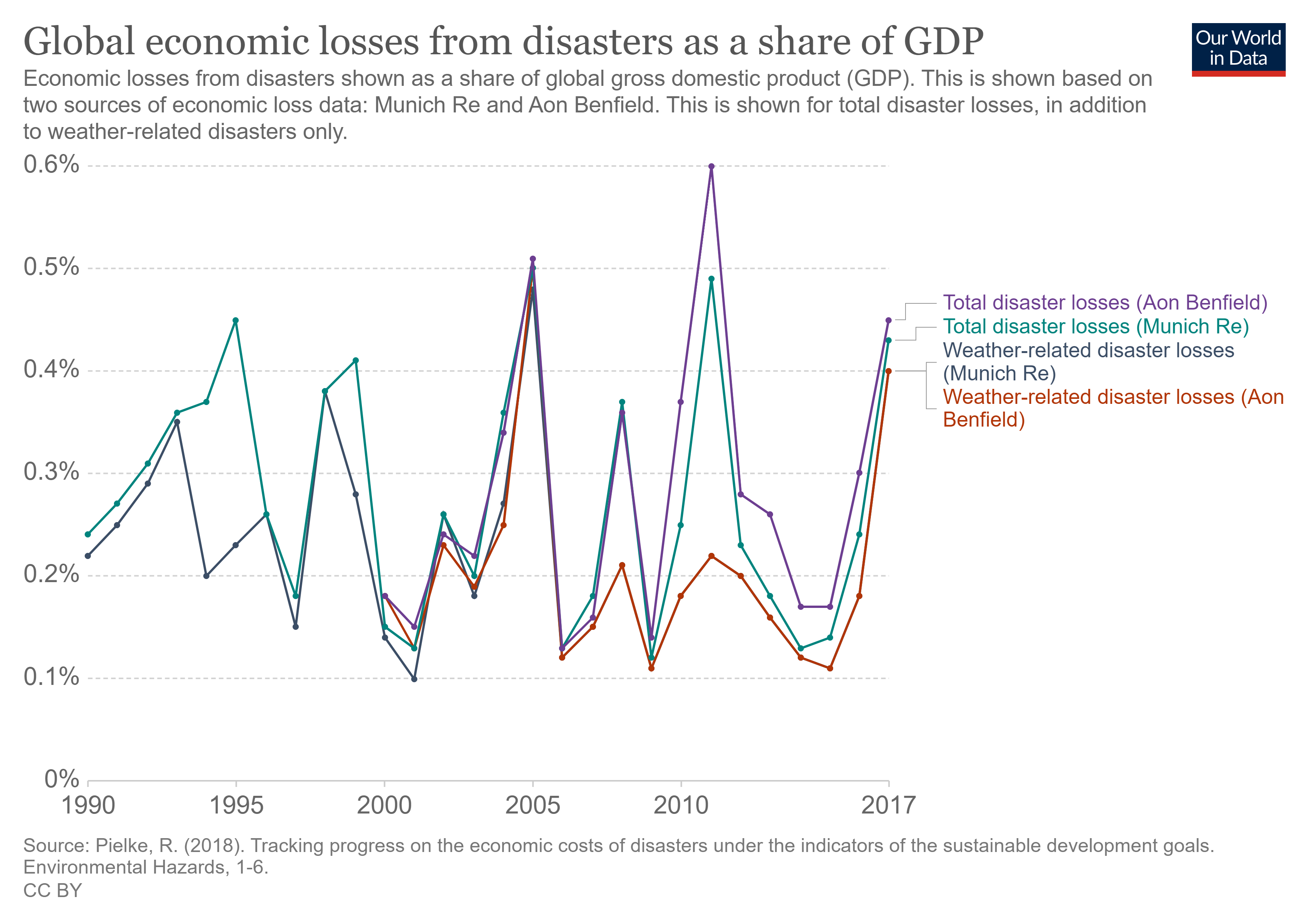
Chart for Indicator 11.5.2 showing the Global economic losses from disasters as a share of GDP

The full text of Target 11.5 is "By 2030, significantly reduce the number of deaths and the number of people affected and substantially decrease the direct economic losses relative to global gross domestic product caused by disasters, including water-related disasters, with a focus on protecting the poor and people in vulnerable situations".

Indicators are:

- Indicator 11.5.1: "Number of deaths, missing persons and directly affected persons attributed to disasters per 100,000 population. Indicators measured here report mortality rates internally displaced persons, missing persons and total numbers affected by natural disasters"
- Indicator 11.5.2: "Direct economic loss in relation to global GDP, damage to critical infrastructure and the number of disruptions to basic services, attributed to disasters."

=== Target 11.6: Reduce the environmental impacts of cities ===
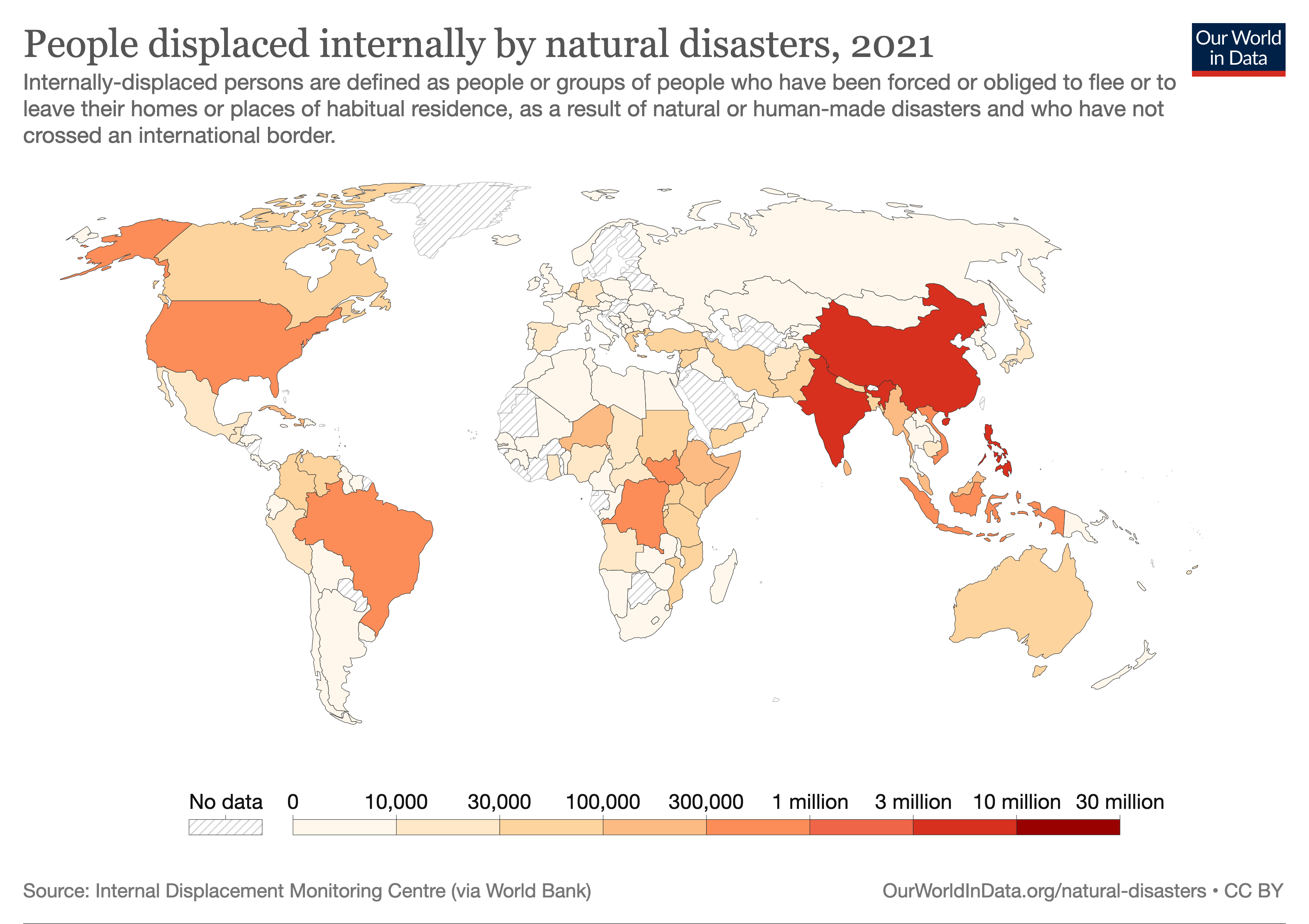
World map for Indicator 11.5.1 in 2017: "Internally displaced persons from natural disasters"

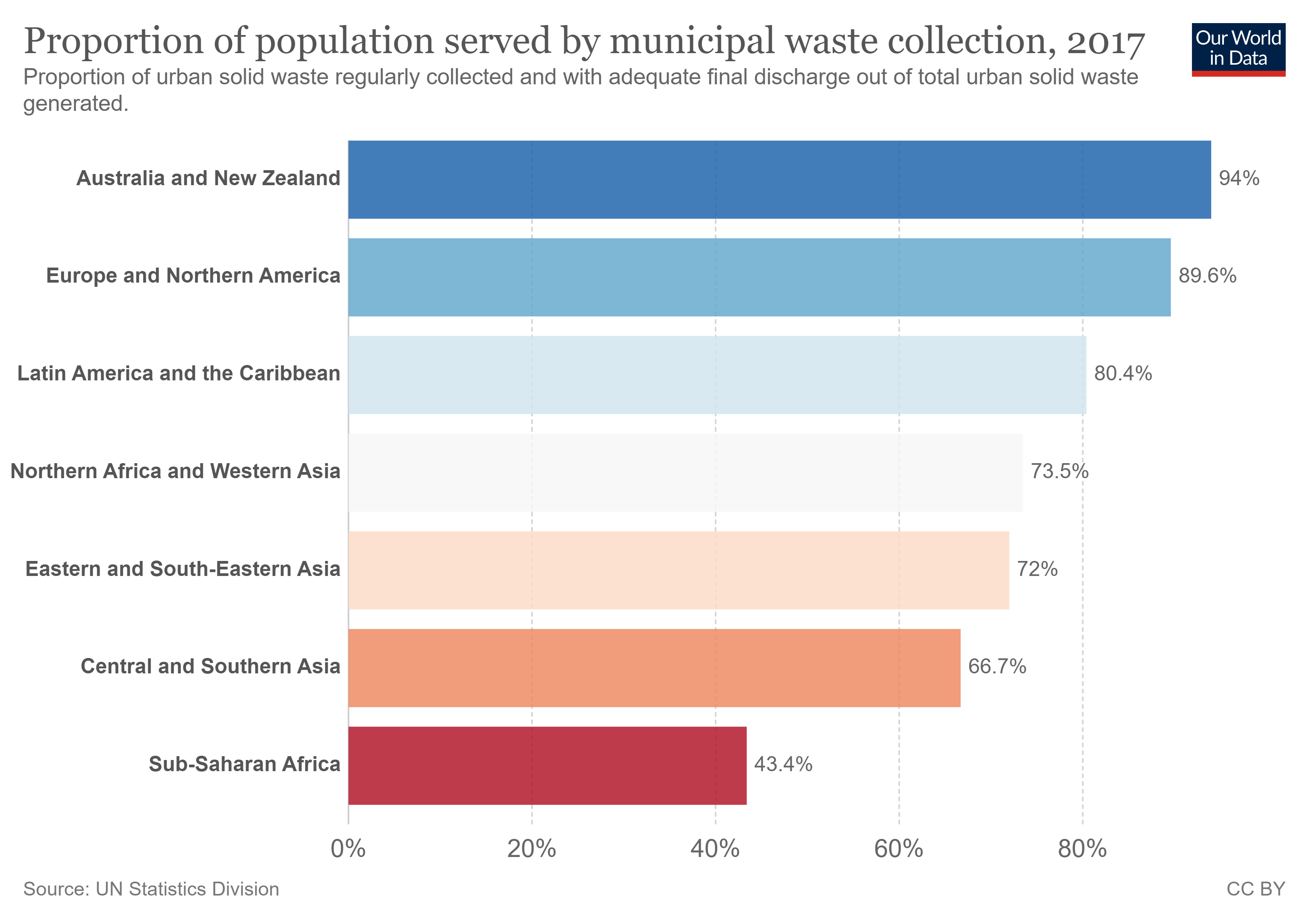
Chart for Indicator 11.6.1 showing the Proportion of Population served by municipal waste collection, 2017

The full text of Target 11.6 is "By 2030, reduce the adverse per capita environmental impact of cities, including by paying special attention to air quality and municipal and other waste management."

The target has two indicators:

- Indicator 11.6.1: Proportion of municipal solid waste collected and managed in controlled facilities out of total municipal waste generated, by cities
- Indicator 11.6.2: "Annual mean levels of fine particulate matter (e.g. PM_{2.5} and PM_{10}) in cities (population weighted)"

=== Target 11.7: Provide access to safe and inclusive green and public spaces ===
The full text of Target 11.7 is: "By 2030, provide universal access to safe, inclusive and accessible, green and public spaces, in particular for women and children, older persons and Persons With Disabilities"

The two indicators include:

- The Indicator 11.7.1: "Average share of the built-up area of cities that is open space for public use for all, by sex, age and persons with disabilities"
- The Indicator 11.7.2: "Proportion of person victim of physical or sexual harassment, by sex, age, disability status and place of occurrence, in the previous 12 months"

=== Target 11.a: Strong national and regional development planning ===
The full text of Target 11.a is "Support positive economic, social and environmental links between urban, peri-urban and rural areas by strengthening national and regional development planning".

It has one indicator: Indicator 11.a.1 is the "Number of countries that have national urban policies or regional development plans that (a) respond to population dynamics; (b) ensure balanced territorial development, and (c) increase local fiscal space."

This indicator is "one of the key metrics to benchmark and monitor urbanization". However, there is currently no data available for this indicator.

The New Urban Agenda was adopted by world leaders in 2016 and provides a series of standards for sustainable urban development.

=== Target 11.b: Implement policies for inclusion, resource efficiency and disaster risk reduction ===
The full text of Target 11.b is "By 2020, substantially increase the number of cities and human settlements adopting and implementing integrated policies and plans towards inclusion, resource efficiency, mitigation and adaptation to climate change, resilience to disasters, and develop and implement, in line with the Sendai Framework for Disaster risk reduction 2015–2030, holistic disaster risk management at all levels."

Unlike most SDGs which have the target year of 2030, this indicator is set to be achieved by 2020.

The two indicators include:

- Indicator 11.b.1: "Number of countries that adopt and implement national disaster risk reduction strategies in line with the Sendai Framework for Disaster Risk Reduction 2015–2030"
- Indicator 11.b.2: "Proportion of local governments that adopt and implement local disaster risk reduction strategies in line with national disaster risk reduction strategies"

A number of challenges in implementing the Sendai Framework for Disaster Risk Reduction have been identified, including inconsistent, unstructured, disorganized data collection and reporting, the lack of incentives for proactive report disaster loss, and the lack of governmental mandate on disaster loss reporting.

=== Target 11.c: Support least developed countries in sustainable and resilient building ===
The full text of Target 11.c is formulated as "Support least developed countries, including through financial and technical assistance, in building sustainable and resilient buildings using local materials".

This target has one Indicator: Indicator 11.c.1 is the "Proportion of financial support to the least developed countries that is allocated to the construction and retrofitting of sustainable, resilient and resource-efficient buildings using local materials".

It was suggested in 2020 to delete Indicator 11.c.1.

=== Custodian agencies ===
The custodian agencies are responsible for data gathering and reporting on the indicators:

- For the indicators of Targets 11.1, 11.2 and 11.3 and also for Indicator 11.a.1 and Indicator 11.c.1: United Nations Human Settlements Programme (UN-HABITAT)
- For Indicator 11.4.1: United Nations Educational, Scientific, and Cultural Organization-Institute for Statistics (UNESCO-UIS)
- For the two indicators under Target 11.5 and for Indicator 11.b.2: United Nations International Strategy for Disaster Reduction (UNISDR)
- For Indicator 11.6.1: United Nations Human Settlements Programme (UN-HABITAT), Department of Economic and Social Affairs (DESA) and UNSD
- For Indicator 11.6.2: World Health Organization

== Monitoring ==
High-level progress reports are prepared by United Nations Secretary General annually, evaluating the progress towards all the Sustainable Development Goals. The most recent report was published in 2021. The previous report was from April 2020.

In 2018, High-level Political Forum (HLPF) took stock of progress on the Sustainable Development Goals and discussed progress, successes, challenges and lessons learned on the road to a fairer, more peaceful and prosperous world and a healthy planet by 2030. SDG 11 was one of the six SDGs discussed in depth.

The progress on the SDG 11 has been stalled by the COVID-19 pandemic. Due to the direct and indirect impacts of the pandemic, this Goal is increasingly less likely to be achieved in a timely manner.

All the UN member states are committed to following up their progress towards implementing the 2030 Agenda and its goals and targets. Almost all the UN member states have presented their national progress towards the SDGs through Voluntary National Review (VNR). Despite the importance of cities within the sustainable development framework, only a few initiatives have emerged to assess progress towards the SDGs on a city scale.

== Challenges ==
=== Impacts of COVID-19 pandemic ===
Cities in many countries were epicentres of COVID-19. Approximately 60% of COVID-19 cases have been found in urban areas, shedding light onto the function of cities in generating and accelerating the pandemic. Both congestion and increased mobility in cities have been named as some of the major contributors to the spread of epidemics through aerosols, droplets and fomites.

The COVID-19 pandemic has illuminated the deeply rooted inequalities in the cities, which is reflected in disproportionate pandemic-related impacts on migrants, the homeless, and the residents of urban slums and informal settlements. The success of SDG 11 post-pandemic requires concerted action on the part of Governments at all levels, civil society and development partners.

During the crisis, cities have emerged as drivers of economic recovery, centres of innovation and catalysts for social and economic transformation. Smart city technologies and solutions have contributed to resilience in cities by facilitating gathering and exchange of information in real time, decreasing risk, and enhancing planning, absorption and adaptation abilities.

== Links with other SDGs ==
SDG 11 interlinks with many of the other SDGs. First, the impact on health (SDG 3, Target 3.9) of city dwellers, as well as improve cities resilience to natural and climate change-induced disasters. It is related to SDG 6 (target 6.1, 6.2 and 6.5), SDG 12 (target 12.4), SDG 14 (target 14.3) Lastly, reducing the impact of communicable diseases and maternal and children mortality which can be found under SDG 3 (targets 3.2 and 3.3).

Furthermore, SDG 11 interlinks with SDG 13 on climate action: The world's cities account for 60–80 per cent of energy consumption and 75 per cent of carbon emissions (this is because 4.2 billion people, or 55 percent of the world's population, lived in cities in 2018).

== Organizations ==
=== UN system ===
- United for Smart Sustainable Cities Initiative (U4SSC) which has been pilot to monitor urban-environment related Sustainable Development Goals (SDGs) projects
- Inter-American Development Bank (IDB)
- UN Industrial Development Organization (UNIDO)
- UN Economic Commission for Africa (ECA)
- United Nations International Strategy for Disaster Reduction (UNISDR)
- United Nations Human Settlements Programme.

=== Major NGOs ===
The following NGOs and other organizations are helping to achieve SDG 11:

- C40 cities is a network of the world's megacities committed to addressing climate change, It is taking bold climate action and leading the way towards having a more sustainable future. C40 also offers cities an effective forum to collaborate, share knowledge and drive meaningful action on climate change.
- ICLEI is committed to sustainable urban development. It helps members to make their cities and regions sustainable, low-carbon, resilient, ecomobile, biodiverse, resource-efficient and healthy, with a green economy and smart infrastructure.
- 100RC developed by the Rockefeller Foundation helps cities around the world to become more resilient to physical, social, and economic shocks and stresses and it supports the adoption and incorporation of a view of resilience that includes not just the shocks, earthquakes, fires, floods, but also the stresses that weaken the fabric of a city on a day to day or cyclical basis.

== Examples at country level ==
=== Canada ===
The Canadian federal government has allotted $10 billion CAD over 3 years to the Canadian Infrastructure Bank to begin investing in green projects across the country focusing on areas such as transit, renewable energy, and building retrofits. The federal government is meeting its SDG 11.2 and SDG 11a targets by investing $1.5 billion in public transit and having 5000 busses in the next 5 years within a wider uplifting growth strategy to refocus the inequalities faced by different urban and rural regions in Canada. The federal government has also seen a slight rise in the proportion of the urban population that lives in inadequate housing, rising from 12.5% in 2011 to 12.7% in 2016, moving away from lowering the goal of adequate housing. Canada has developed national indicators and policies for implementing SDG 11. Canadian priorities include affordable housing, public transportation, healthy communities, air quality, parks and green spaces, cultural heritage and resilience. Urban heat is another challenge for sustainable Canadian communities. Research in Toronto has identified differences in heat vulnerability between neighbourhoods, highlighting the importance of considering both environmental conditions and socioeconomic factors when planning urban adaptation measures (Bu et al., 2024).

== See also ==
- Climate change and cities
- List of most-polluted cities by particulate matter concentration
- Transit-oriented development – Urban planning prioritising transit
