= Secondary city =

Type of urban hub

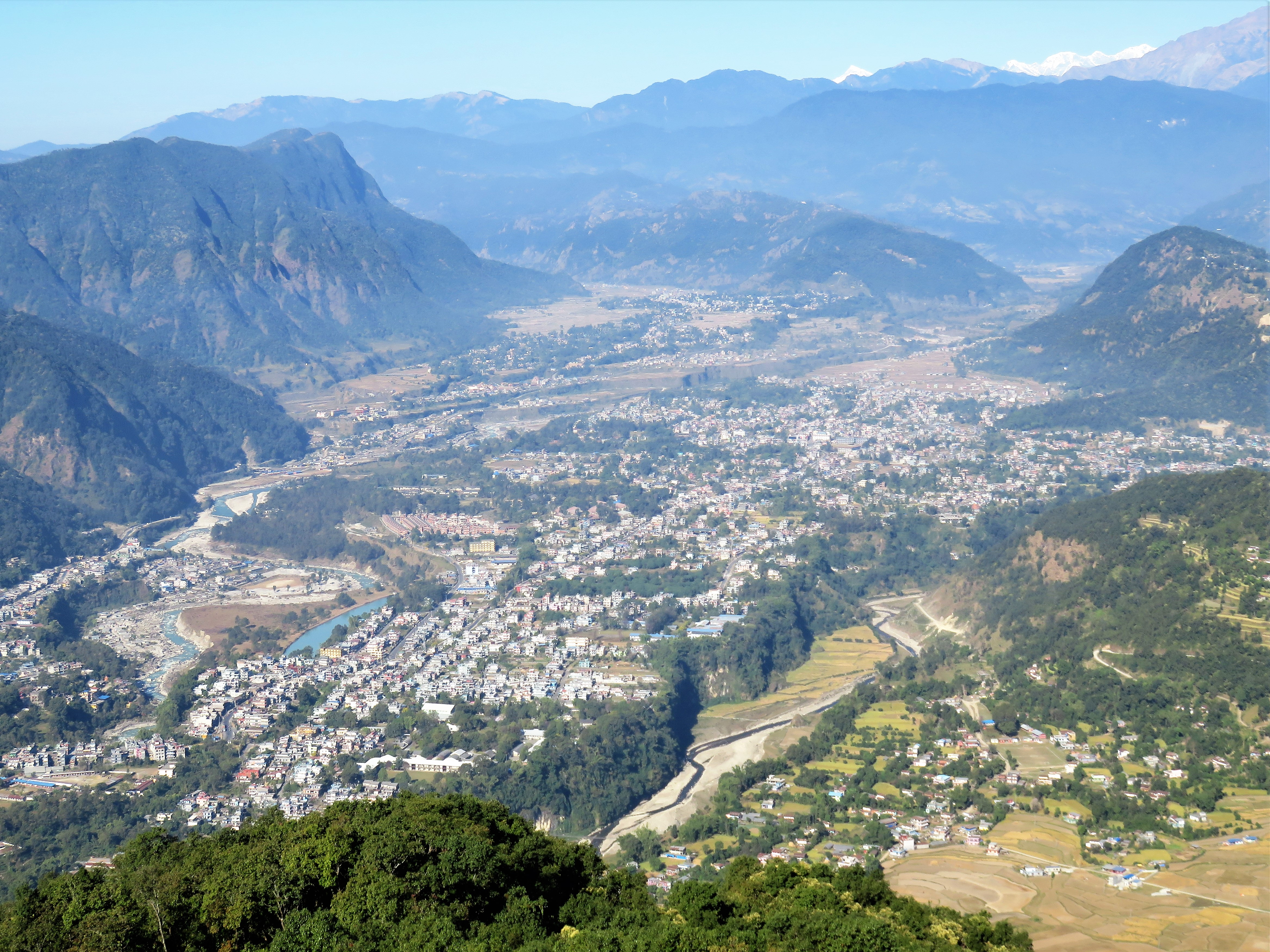
Pokhara, a secondary city in Nepal, is the capital of Gandaki Province. It is a major tourist center for mountain trekking.

A secondary city is an urban hub that fills specific regional and local needs related to governance, economics, finance, education, trade, transportation. A secondary city is defined by population, area, function, and economic status, but also by their relationship to neighboring and distant cities and their socio-economic status. A secondary city may emerge from a cluster of smaller cities in a metropolitan region or may be the capital city of a province, state, or second-tier administrative unit within a country. Secondary cities are the fastest-growing urban areas in lower- and middle-income countries, experiencing unplanned growth and development. By 2030, there will be twice as many medium-size cities as there were in 1990, outnumbering the total number of megacities. According to the World Bank, secondary cities make up almost 40% of the world's cities population. Many secondary cities in the Global South are expected to undergo massive expansions in the next few decades comparable to city growth in Europe and North America over the past two centuries. These cities are unique environments that generally have limited data and information on infrastructure, land tenure, and planning.

== Vs megacities ==
Secondary cities are often eclipsed by megacities that dominate urbanization programs due to their size and influence. However, secondary cities represent a larger percentage of the urban population worldwide and there are many more secondary cities than megacities. For example, in sub-Saharan Africa secondary cities are experiencing more than fifty percent of the continent's urban growth. The U.N. World Urbanization Prospects 2018 notes that approximately only seven percent of the world's population lives in megacities of 10 million or more.

Secondary cities have their own socio-economic and political culture that differs from megacities. They have more land, are less developed, and offer more opportunities for investment, adaptation, and improvisation. These cities are important emerging centers of economic activity that relieve the pressures of migration to megacities. While the large cities play a significant role in shaping the economic geography of cities in fostering global trade, travel and investment, it is secondary cities which will have a much stronger influence in the future upon the economic development of countries.

The rapid growth of secondary cities and general lack of infrastructure, particularly in lower and middle income countries, make these cities prime locations for urban sprawl and informal settlements with inadequate basic services. According to UN-HABITAT, "slum population now expands annually by 25 million." Countries like India are developing secondary cities to absorb informal dwellers—as India's chief economic planner, Montek Singh Ahluwalia in 2007, observes: "One hundred million people are moving to cities in the next 10 years, and it's important that these 100 million are absorbed into second-tier cities instead of showing up in Delhi or Mumbai."

== Characteristics ==
Secondary cities are difficult to define and vary from country to country and amongst the variety of urban reporting tools such as the U.N. World Urbanization Prospects and the Atlas of Urban Expansion. Secondary cities reflect their countries' demographic and geographic characteristics. The population of a secondary city may range from 10–50% of the country's largest city, although some may be smaller than this. Population is a measure of the urban scale but does not reflect the role and function of the city. For example, while a secondary city in Costa Rica will have significant population differences from a secondary city in China, their functional roles may be similar.

Secondary cities can be characterized into three general categories: sub-national functional centers (i.e., provincial capital, industry center, university hub, tourist attraction); city clusters or satellite urban areas surrounding a larger metropolitan region; and an economic trade corridor developing along major transportation routes. These categories define the regional importance of secondary cities and their linkages to the surrounding hinterland and rural areas. Secondary cities have a diffuse genealogy creating a hybrid, socio-cultural urban dynamic often in contrast to larger urban areas. The secondary city is a location for improvisation and innovation. Local patterns of commerce, the interactions of civil society, and decentralized political activities in secondary cities reflect a shifting economies, changing stakeholder alliances, and adaptive governance structures.

== Climate resilience ==
Climate change and cities are at the forefront of urban development and investment in the 21st century. Secondary cities are an emerging arena in which to devise climate change initiatives. These adaptations include initiatives specifically focused on new immigrants and vulnerable populations (i.e., the elderly, children, women), expanding informal settlements and the need for strategies for access to basic services (i.e., electricity, water, community gardens), urban zoning to enhance green spaces (i.e., tree planting, riparian restoration), and building designs and materials to create structures that reflect the seasonal changes caused by climate change (i.e., access to air conditioning; adequate heating facilities).

== Around the world ==
Secondary cities are found in all parts of the world; however, nearly two-thirds of secondary cities are located in Asia and Africa. These secondary cities reflect the specific geography of the countries in which they are found. While Asian countries are very diverse, secondary cities within these countries are distinct. For example, China's secondary cities are very different from Indonesia's secondary cities. China's second and third-level cities are locations where private sector global expansion occurs that include top hotel companies, increased domestic travel via train and air, and international meeting facilities. These secondary cities are part of the global and local economy demonstrating their importance as regional hubs of commerce and transportation. Indonesia's secondary cities have experienced rapid growth and expansion. Greater Surabaya is illustrative of patterns of suburban expansion supporting industrial development and facilitating commuter culture to the urban center. The rapid urban expansion has resulted in extensive informal settlements with inadequate infrastructure (i.e., electricity) and limited access to basic services (i.e., water supply).

African secondary cities host 80% of the continent's urban population outside of the largest urban agglomerations and has over 70 cities with greater than 1 million inhabitants. These rapidly growing urban areas attract rural migrants who move into informal settlements without basic amenities, high levels of pollution, loss of biodiversity, and poor sanitation. However, economic development and infrastructure improvements have largely been concentrated in capital cities many of which are megacities such as Nairobi, Lagos, and Kampala. Global evidence suggests that secondary cities provide better opportunities for poverty reduction as well as relieving population pressures on larger cities. Examples of African secondary cities include Pemba, Mozambique; Boke-Kamsar, Guinea; and Mekelle, Ethiopia. Both Pemba and Kamsar are port cities that provide important trade services for economic development. Boke-Kamsar is a rapidly expanding urban corridor for coastal trade and inland mining intersect. Mekelle, Ethiopia is the provincial capital of Tigray and the center of regional conflict (2020–2022) and staging area for provisioning of food and resources.

Latin American secondary cities are locations of economic and social development. According to the Development Bank of Latin America, these urban areas are home to 32% of Latin Americans and are estimated to include 17% of GDP. In Latin America, where primary cities long monopolized growth, secondary cities like Tijuana, Curitiba, Temuco, Salvador, and Belém are booming, "with the fastest growth of all occurring cities with between 100,000 and 500,000 inhabitants."

== Future ==
In the future, secondary cities will have a strong influence on the economic development of countries. While the importance of secondary cities is increasingly recognised, growing inequalities are emerging between systems of cities and regions, with metropolitan areas often prospering at the expense of smaller cities and rural areas. Secondary cities are areas where experimental strategies and innovative planning can be tested.

Networks are critical to improving the level of communications, exchange and movement among systems of secondary cities. Many networks will require investment in hard infrastructure, such as transport and communications, and soft infrastructure to facilitate greater economic, social, cultural and governance exchange. This involves building city, industry and firm partnerships, as well as collaborative governance and economic development. Collaboration is vital to finance hard and soft strategic infrastructure, through arrangements to share revenue as well as development, operating and maintenance costs. If enhanced connectivity is to be used as a strategy to support the economic development of secondary cities, policy makers must understand the need for integration of hard and soft connectivity elements, and how governments can facilitate their development. If the efficiency of secondary cities were to improve this could increase the GDP of many poor cities and rural regions.
