= Climate Positive Development Program =

C40 Climate Positive Development Program
- Founded: May 2009
- Type: International organization
- Purpose: Net negative carbon emissions, District Scale Recognition Program
- Region served: Application based; Global best practices
- Method: Best practices framework; Outcome based
- Key people: São Paulo Mayor Fernando Haddad (Chairman); Stockholm Mayor Sten Nordin (Chairman)
- Website: www.climatepositivedevelopment.org

The C40 Cities Climate Leadership Group’s Climate Positive Development Program (Climate Positive) was launched in May 2009 in partnership with the Clinton Climate Initiative and the U.S. Green Building Council. The program brings together leading district-scale new-build and regeneration projects working to achieve "Climate Positive"—or net carbon negative—outcomes in cities around the world. As part of the C40's Sustainable Communities Initiative, it aims to create a model for large-scale urban communities and to support projects that serve as urban laboratories for cities seeking to grow in ways that are environmentally sustainable, climate resilient, and economically viable.

Climate Positive is an exclusive program, with a competitive application process, and currently comprises 17 global projects that will collectively reduce the emissions impact of more than one million people. The cities in which the Climate Positive projects are located support the implementation process locally and share best practices globally through participation in the C40 Climate Positive Network. The projects are in different stages of development, but share key characteristics like high densities, highly efficient buildings, mixed-use zoning and transit accessibility.

== History ==
Climate Positive was developed in partnership by the C40, the Clinton Climate Initiative, and the U.S. Green Building Council and was launched at the C40 Cities Climate Leadership Group summit in Seoul, South Korea in May 2009. At the time of its launch, Climate Positive had 16 founding projects on six continents, supported by local governments and property developers. In October 2012, the City of Copenhagen’s Nordhaven project was accepted to join the Program, and in São Paulo, Obdebrecht's Parque da Cidade (Park of the city) formally launched with a big kick-off event bringing the total number of projects to 17.

The current projects are located in Melbourne and Sydney, Australia; Palhoça and São Paulo, Brazil; Toronto and Victoria, Canada; Copenhagen, Denmark; Ahmedabad and Jaipur, India; Pretoria, South Africa; Seoul, South Korea; Stockholm, Sweden; London, United Kingdom; Oberlin, Portland and San Francisco, United States.

== Objectives ==
With the primary objective to build Climate Positive (operational net carbon negative) districts in cities, the Climate Positive Development Program attempts to change the paradigm of district scale development through three main activities:

- Recognizing exemplary achievement
- Sharing best practices and challenges experienced amongst development partners
- Facilitating the broader implementation in cities of scalable projects, policies, and programs with low carbon emissions

== Leadership ==
In April 2013, it was announced that the Mayor of São Paulo, Fernando Haddad, and the Mayor of Stockholm, Sten Nordin would share the chairmanship of Climate Positive and together lead the network due to their leadership and commitment to finding replicable city-scale solutions to address climate change.

== How it Works ==
Each Climate Positive Development project has a unique profile determined by its distinct economic, political, and climate challenges; however, every project aims to lower their operational greenhouse gas emissions to below zero. Moreover, development partners across the 18 projects are expected to focus on reducing operational carbon emissions at the district scale from transportation, energy, and waste sectors, and are required to share the solutions they come up with., The Program also provides technical and logistical support to Development Partners by hosting learning programs and webinars, convening private sector firms to produce tools and templates for project use, increasing project visibility through various media channels, and granting access to technical experts and other partners within the Climate Positive and C40 network.

In order to become Climate Positive and achieve net carbon negative outcomes, development partners earn Climate Positive Credits by sequestering emissions on-site and abating emissions from surrounding communities. There are many different paths to the Climate Positive outcome of net-negative operational GHG emissions; each project will use a different set of strategies and technologies according to its local opportunities, guided by the Climate Positive Development Framework, which lays out the four stages of Climate Positive. As projects move through the four recognition stages, from Climate Positive Candidate, to Climate Positive Participant, to Progress Site, and ultimately at project completion and Climate Positive certification, development partners submit documentation to the Program to ensure that they remain on track, and receive feedback from program staff and affiliated technical experts.

== The Projects ==
- Victoria Harbour, Melbourne, Australia
- Barangaroo, Sydney, Australia
- Parque da Cidade, São Paulo, Brazil
- Pedra Branca Sustainable Urbanism, Palhoça, Greater Florianópolis, Brazil
- Dockside Green, Victoria, BC, Canada
- Waterfront Toronto, Lower Don Lands, Toronto, ON, Canada
- Nordhavn, Copenhagen, Denmark
- ProjectZero, Sønderborg, Denmark
- Godrej Garden City, Ahmedabad, India
- Mahindra World City, Jaipur, India
- Menlyn Maine, Pretoria, South Africa
- Magok Urban Development Project, Seoul, South Korea
- Stockholm Royal Seaport, Stockholm, Sweden
- Elephant & Castle, London, UK
- Treasure Island Development Project, San Francisco, CA, USA
- The Oberlin Project, Oberlin, OH, USA
- Southwaterfront EcoDistricts, Portland, OR, USA
- The Shinagawa Project, Tokyo, Japan

== See also ==
- Adaptation to global warming
- Climate change mitigation
- Covenant of Mayors
- Energy conservation
- ICLEI - Local Governments for Sustainability
- Individual and political action on climate change
- London Climate Change Agency
- PlaNYC
- Renewable energy
- World energy resources and consumption
