= Sandip Joshi =

Indian politician (born 1978)

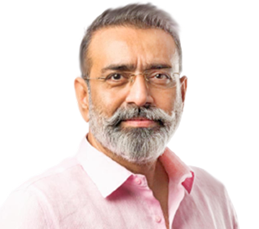

Member of Maharashtra Legislative Council
- Incumbent
- Assumed office 20 March 2025
- Preceded by: Pravin Datke
- Constituency: elected by the Members of Legislative Assembly

Mayor of Nagpur
- In office 22 November 2019 – 5 January 2021
- Preceded by: Nanda Jichkar
- Succeeded by: Dayashankar Tiwari

Personal details
- Born: 20 August 1970 (age 55)
- Party: Bharatiya Janata Party
- Spouse: Devyani Joshi
- Children: 1 daughter
- Parents: Diwakarrao Joshi (father); Madhuri Joshi (mother)
- Education: B.Com
- Alma mater: Rashtrasant Tukadoji Maharaj Nagpur University
- Website: https://sandipjoshi.in/

Sandip Diwakarrao Joshi (born 20 August 1970) is an Indian politician who is serving as the Member of Maharashtra Legislative Council. He had earlier served as the Mayor of Nagpur Municipal Corporation from 2019 to 2020. He had also contested MLC elections from Nagpur Graduates constituency in 2020 but had lost to Abhijit Wanjarri of INC.

== Positions held ==
Office	Tenure
Corporator of Nagpur Municipal Corporation	2002-22
Chairman of Standing Committee Nagpur Municipal Corporation	2010-12
Mayor of Nagpur	2019-21
Member of Maharashtra Legislative Council	2025-
