= Pioli River =

River in India

The Pioli River (Marathi : पिवळी नदी) is a river flowing through the northern part of the city of Nagpur, in Maharashtra, India. Pioli river is a left bank tributary of the Nag river.

This river feeds the Kanhan-Pench river system through the Nag River. The river is 16.7 kilometres long and originates in Lava-Dhaba village, West of Nagpur. It meets the Nag River near Pawangaon. Four natural water streams, including Bor stream, used to feed the river. It also receives water from the outlet of Gorewada Dam in North West Nagpur and Chambhar Nala in Central Nagpur

The river serves as a part of drainage for Nagpur and as a result its ecosystem is heavily polluted by urban waste from the city. The river is also threatened by encroachment at many places.

The Nagpur Municipal Corporation has planned three sewage treatment plants along the river as a part of its rejuvenation programme.
