= Vikas Kumbhare =

Indian politician

Vikas Shankarrao Kumbhare

Member of Maharashtra Legislative Assembly
- In office (2009-2014), (2014-2019), (2019 – 2024)
- Preceded by: Annes Majid Ahmed
- Succeeded by: Pravin Datke
- Constituency: Nagpur Central

Personal details
- Born: 9 March 1962 (age 64) Nagpur, Maharashtra, India
- Party: Bharatiya Janata Party
- Spouse: Lalita Kumbhare
- Children: Shreyash Kumbhare and Rohit Kumbhare

Vikas Shankarrao Kumbhare (born 9 March 1962) is a member of the 12th, 13th and 14th Maharashtra Legislative Assembly. He represents the Nagpur Central Assembly Constituency. Kumbhare has been mentioned as one of the more active members during one session (9–20 December 2013) of the Legislative Assembly.

== Family and personal life ==
Vikas Khumbhare was born on 9 March 1962 in Nagpur in a Halba family. He married Lalita. They have two sons, Shreyash and Rohit.

== Political career ==
- Kumbhare was elected as a Corporator.
- Elected as BJYM President from Central Nagpur.
- Elected as MLA from Central Nagpur.

=== Positions held ===
==== Within BJP ====
- President, BJYM Nagpur Central
- President, Nagpur (Central) BJP
- Nagpur Municipal Corporation Corporator
