= Nanda Jichkar =

Nagpur Mayor

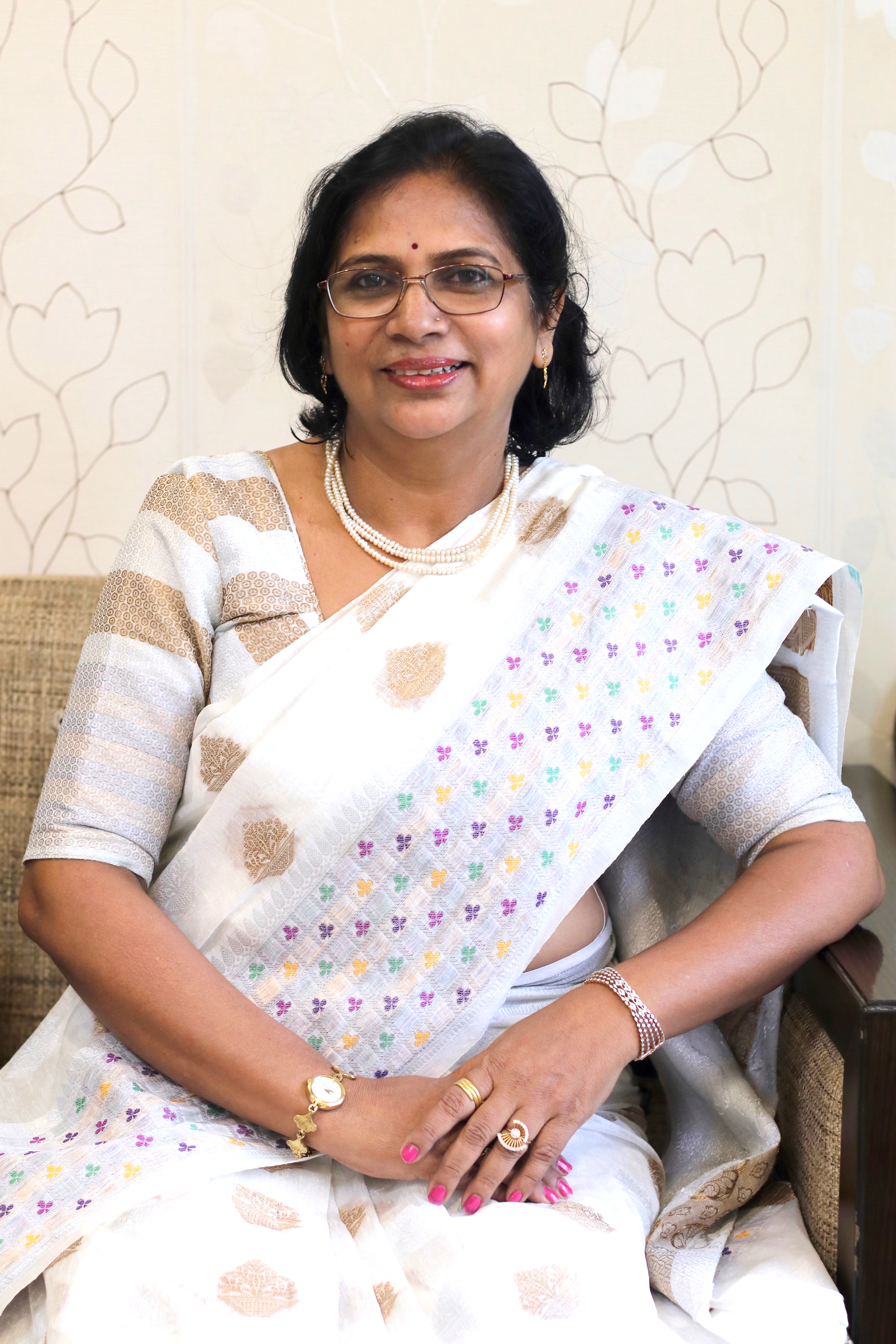

Mayor of Nagpur
- In office 5 March 2017 – 22 November 2019
- Preceded by: Pravin Datke
- Succeeded by: Sandip Joshi

Personal details
- Born: February 1, 1964 (age 62) Nagpur
- Occupation: Politician

Nanda Jichkar (born 1 February 1964) is an Indian politician.

== Background and education ==
Jichkar was born on 1 February 1964 to a middle-class family in the Colonel Bagh, Nagpur. She completed her M.Sc. and M.Phil. in Statistics from Nagpur University. She also holds a Post Graduate Diploma in Computer Science (PGDCS), B.Ed (Education) and M.A. (Psychology))

== Positions held ==
Jichkar is a two term corporator from Bhartiya Janata Party in Nagpur Municipal Corporation also served twice as the President of the Bharatiya Janata Party (BJP) Nagpur Women Wing (Nagpur BJP City President Mahila Aghadi). She served as the mayor of Nagpur Municipal Corporation from March 2017 to November 2019. She was a Member of Centre of Women's Studies and Development in Nagpur University. She is as well Vice President for Maharashtra State Mayor Council. She is the founding member of Mayor Innovation Council. Jichkar serves as a Board Member on Global Covenant of Mayors (GCOM) for Climate Action (chaired by Mr. Michael Bloomberg). She is currently also a Vice President of Regional Executive Committee (REXCom) for ICLEI South Asia.

Jichkar has been mentioned among 25 women leader across the world by National Geographic.
