= LCCA =

LCCA may refer to:

- Life Care Centers of America, an elder care company in the US
- Life cycle cost analysis, a tool to determine the most cost-effective option among different competing alternatives
- London Climate Change Agency in the United Kingdom
- Lutheran Church of Central Africa, a Christian denomination of the Lutheran tradition based in the African countries of Zambia and Malawi
- Lancashire Combined County Authority, a combined authority in the United Kingdom
