= Dayashankar Tiwari =

Indian politician

President of Bharatiya Janata Party – Nagpur City
- Incumbent
- Assumed office 14 May 2025
- President: Ravindra Chavan
- Preceded by: Jitendra Kukde

Mayor of Nagpur
- In office 5 January 2021 – 4 March 2022
- Preceded by: Sandip Joshi
- Succeeded by: Neeta Thakre

Personal details
- Parent: Chandrashekhar Tiwari (father)

Dayashankar Tiwari is an Indian politician who served as 54th Mayor of Nagpur.

== Career ==
He is post graduate and has done Master of Arts. He was the nominee of Bharatiya Janata Party for Mayor for Nagpur Municipal Corporation. He got 107 votes from 151 members. He is the successor of Sandeep Joshi after his resignation.
