= C40 Cities Climate Leadership Group =

Climate change organization

C40 Cities
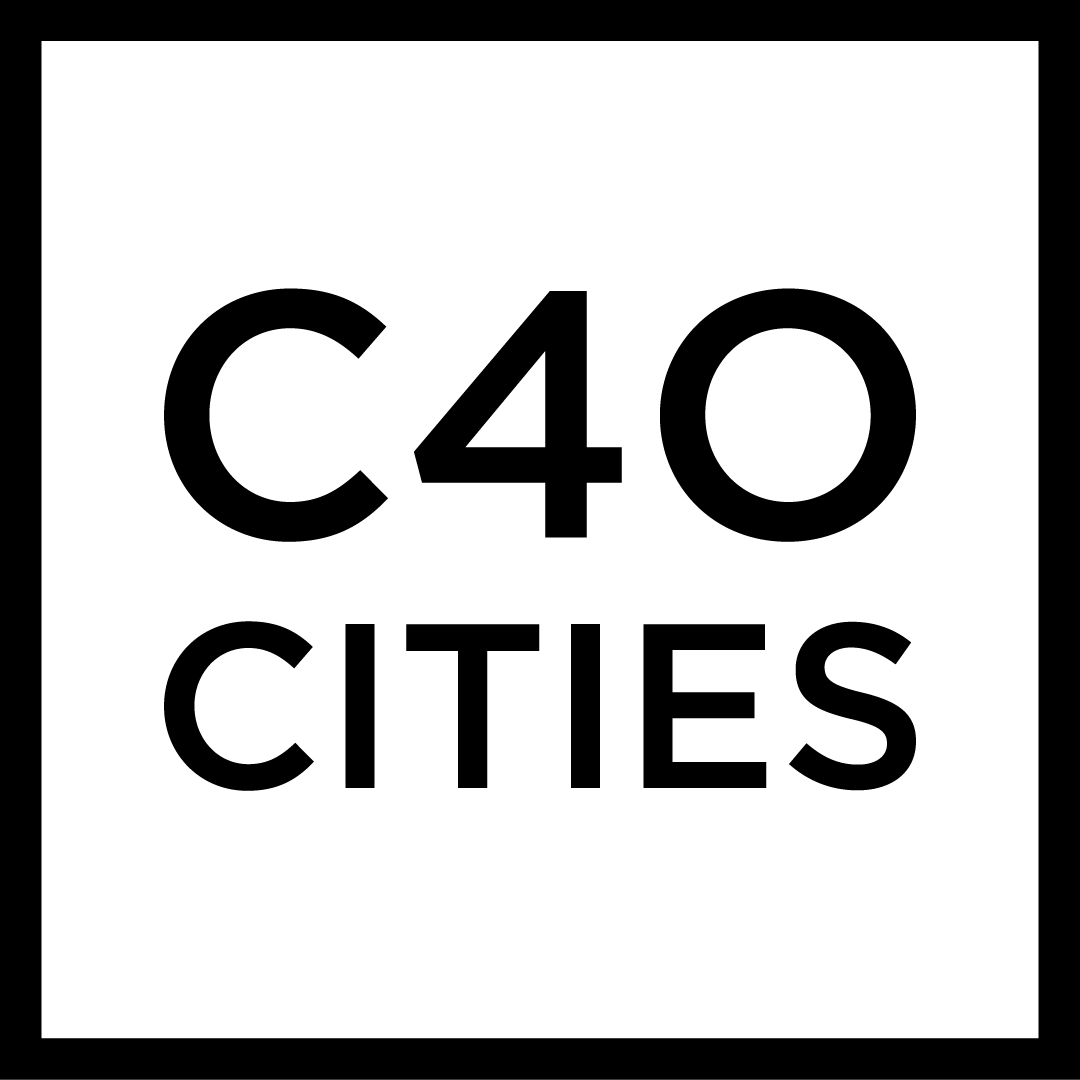
- Founded: October 2005 (London, United Kingdom)
- Type: International organization
- Purpose: Climate change
- Region served: Global member cities
- Method: Direct assistance, peer-to-peer exchange, research & communications. What we do for cities.
- Steering Committee: Melbourne, London, Freetown, Jakarta, Abidjan, Phoenix, Medellin, Nairobi, Seoul, Curitiba, Oslo, Milan, Hong Kong, Copenhagen, Boston
- Key people: Mayor Sadiq Khan (Co-Chair); Mayor Yvonne Aki-Sawyerr (Co-Chair); Michael Bloomberg (President of the Board of Directors); President Bill Clinton (Founding Partner); Mark Watts (Executive Director)
- Website: C40.org; C40 Knowledge Hub
- Formerly called: C40 Cities Climate Leadership Group

C40 Cities (formerly C40 Cities Climate Leadership Group) is a group of 96 cities that represents more than ten percent of the world's population and 23 percent of the global economy. Created and led by cities, C40 is focused on fighting the climate crisis and driving urban action that reduces greenhouse gas emissions and climate risks, while increasing the health, wellbeing and economic opportunities of urban residents.

From 2023, Mayor of London, Sadiq Khan and Mayor of Freetown, Yvonne Aki-Sawyerr serve as C40's Co-Chair, former mayor of New York City Michael Bloomberg as Board President, and Mark Watts as Executive Director. All four work closely with the 13-member steering committee, the Board of Directors and professional staff. The rotating steering committee of C40 mayors provides strategic direction and governance. Steering committee members include: London, Freetown, Melbourne, Jakarta, Abidjan, Phoenix, Medellin, Copenhagen, Nairobi, Tokyo, Curitiba, Boston, Milan, Seoul, Oslo and Hong Kong.

Working across multiple sectors and initiative areas, C40 convenes networks of cities providing a suite of services in support of their efforts, including: direct technical assistance; facilitation of peer-to-peer exchange; and research, knowledge sharing & communications. C40 is also positioning cities as a leading force for climate action around the world, defining and amplifying their call to national governments for greater support and autonomy in creating a sustainable future.

== History ==
C40 started in October 2005 when London Mayor Ken Livingstone convened representatives from 18 megacities to forge an agreement on cooperatively reducing climate pollution and created the 'C20'. In 2006, Mayor Livingstone and the Clinton Climate Initiative (CCI) - led by the efforts of former U.S. President Bill Clinton - combined to strengthen both organizations, bringing the number of cities in the network to 40 and helping to deliver projects and project management for participating cities to further enhance emissions reductions efforts.

Serving as C40's first chair, Livingstone established the C40 Secretariat in London, set up the C40 Steering Committee, and initiated the use of C40 workshops to exchange best practices amongst participating cities. In 2008, former mayor of Toronto David Miller took over as C40 chair. Highlights of his tenure included the Copenhagen Climate Summit for Mayors and the C40 Cities Mayors Summit in Seoul, both in 2009, as well as the launch of practical action initiatives for cities, such as the Climate Positive Development Program and the Carbon Finance Capacity Building program.

Three-term Mayor of New York City Michael Bloomberg served as chair from 2010 to 2013. During his three-year tenure, Mayor Bloomberg demonstrated unwavering commitment to building a professional organization and establishing measurable and uniform benchmarks for success, as well as expanding knowledge-sharing between cities and partner organizations with similar priorities. Key milestones during his chairmanship include the full integration of the CCI Cities Program into the C40, and the C40 Mayors Summits in São Paulo and Johannesburg. Under Mayor Bloomberg's leadership, C40 grew to include 63 cities.

In December 2013 former mayor of Rio de Janeiro Eduardo Paes became Chair of C40. During his tenure Mayor Paes oversaw the addition of more than 20 new member cities (particularly those in the Global South) several groundbreaking research reports, successful international events, and thriving global partnerships, all of which are helping cities make real contributions to the reduction of global greenhouse gas emissions and climate risks. He also helped launch the Compact of Mayors (now the Global Covenant of Mayors for Climate & Energy), put in place the C40 Cities Finance Facility, and oversaw the opening of a permanent C40 office in Rio de Janeiro, at the Museum of Tomorrow.

In 2015, as C40 marked its 10th anniversary, cities were crucial voices in shaping and advocating for a strong Paris Agreement—just as city leaders will be crucial in delivering on its ambition going forward. More than 1,000 mayors, local representatives, and community leaders from around the world took part in the Climate Summit for Local Leaders, hosted by Mayor of Paris Anne Hidalgo and the UN Secretary-General's Special Envoy for Cities and Climate Change Michael R. Bloomberg during the 2015 United Nations Climate Change Conference.

In August 2016, Mayor of Paris Anne Hidalgo became C40's first chairwoman after being voted in unanimously by the Steering Committee. Mayor Hidalgo has announced an ambitious agenda for the organization, including plans to focus on securing green financing, supporting compliance with the Global Covenant of Mayors for Climate & Energy, encouraging inclusive and sustainable growth in cities, and recognizing the leadership of women in tackling climate change.

In December 2016, C40 held its sixth biennial Mayors Summit in Mexico City. The Global Summit, hosted by Mayor of Mexico City Miguel Ángel Mancera, was attended by 1,400 people, including representatives from more than 90 cities.

The current chair of C40 Cities is Mayor Sadiq Khan of London, United Kingdom.

A report in 2019 by C40 Cities, Arup and the University of Leeds set out a number of actions that C40 cities are likely to need to enact to counter the effects of global warming.

== Membership ==
While C40 originally targeted megacities for their greater capacity to address climate change, C40 now offers three types of membership categories to reflect the diversity of cities taking action to address climate change. The categories consider such characteristics as population size, economic output, environmental leadership, and the length of a city's membership.

1. Megacities

- Population: City population of 3 million or more, and/or metropolitan area population of 10 million or more, either currently or projected for 2025. OR
- GDP: One of the top 25 global cities, ranked by current GDP output, at purchasing-power parity (PPP), either currently or projected for 2025.

2. Innovator Cities

- Cities that do not qualify as Megacities but have shown clear leadership in environmental and climate change work.
- An Innovator City must be internationally recognized for barrier-breaking climate work, a leader in the field of environmental sustainability, and a regionally recognized “anchor city” for the relevant metropolitan area.

3. Observer Cities

- A short-term category for new cities applying to join the C40 for the first time; all cities applying for Megacity or Innovator membership will initially be admitted as Observers until they meet C40's year-one participation requirements, for up to one year.
- A longer-term category for cities that meet Megacity or Innovator City guidelines and participation requirements, but for local regulatory or procedural reasons, are unable to approve participation as a Megacity or Innovator City expeditiously.

=== Member cities ===
C40 has 96 member cities across seven geographic regions.

- Africa:

Africa
City	Country	Member Since
Abidjan	Ivory Coast	2018
Accra	Ghana	2015
Addis Ababa	Ethiopia	2007
Cape Town	South Africa	2014
Dakar	Senegal	2016
Dar es Salaam	Tanzania	2014
Durban	South Africa	2015
Ekurhuleni	South Africa	2020
Freetown	Sierra Leone	2019
Johannesburg	South Africa	2006
Lagos	Nigeria	2007
Nairobi	Kenya	2014
Tshwane	South Africa	2014

- East Asia:
  - China – Beijing
  - China – Chengdu
  - China – Dalian
  - China – Fuzhou
  - China – Guangzhou
  - China – Hangzhou
  - Hong Kong – Hong Kong
  - China – Nanjing
  - China – Qingdao
  - China – Shanghai
  - China – Shenzhen
  - China – Wuhan
  - China – Zhenjiang
  - Japan – Tokyo
  - Japan – Yokohama
  - South Korea – Seoul
- Europe:
  - Denmark – Copenhagen
  - France – Paris
  - Germany – Berlin
  - Germany – Heidelberg
  - Greece – Athens
  - Italy – Milan
  - Italy – Rome
  - Italy – Venice
  - Netherlands – Amsterdam
  - Netherlands – Rotterdam
  - Norway – Oslo
  - Poland – Warsaw
  - Portugal – Lisbon
  - Russia – Moscow
  - Spain – Barcelona
  - Spain – Madrid
  - Sweden – Stockholm
  - Turkey – Istanbul
  - United Kingdom – London
- South America:
  - Argentina – Buenos Aires
  - Brazil – Curitiba
  - Brazil – Rio de Janeiro
  - Brazil – São Paulo
  - Brazil – Salvador
  - Chile – Santiago
  - Colombia – Bogotá
  - Colombia – Medellín
  - Ecuador – Quito
  - Peru – Lima
  - Venezuela – Caracas
- North America:
  - Canada – Montreal
  - Canada – Toronto
  - Canada – Vancouver
  - Mexico – Guadalajara
  - Mexico – Mexico City
  - United States – Austin
  - United States – Boston
  - United States – Chicago
  - United States – Houston
  - United States – Phoenix
  - United States – Los Angeles
  - United States – Miami
  - United States – New Orleans
  - United States – New York City
  - United States – Philadelphia
  - United States – Portland
  - United States – San Francisco
  - United States – Seattle
  - United States – Washington, DC
- South and West Asia:
  - Bangladesh – Dhaka
  - India – Bengaluru
  - India – Chennai
  - India – Jaipur
  - India – Kolkata
  - India – Mumbai
  - India – New Delhi
  - India - Ahmedabad
  - Israel – Tel Aviv
  - Jordan – Amman
  - Pakistan – Karachi
  - United Arab Emirates – Dubai
- Southeast Asia & Oceania:
  - Australia – City of Melbourne
  - Australia – City of Sydney
  - Indonesia – Jakarta
  - Malaysia – Kuala Lumpur
  - New Zealand – Auckland
  - Philippines – Quezon City
  - Singapore – Singapore
  - Thailand – Bangkok
  - Vietnam – Hanoi
  - Vietnam – Ho Chi Minh City

|}

=== Climate Positive ===
The C40 Cities Climate Leadership Group’s Climate Positive Development Program (Climate Positive) was launched in May 2009 in partnership with the Clinton Climate Initiative and the U.S. Green Building Council. The program brings together leading district-scale new-build and regeneration projects working to achieve "Climate Positive"—or net carbon negative—outcomes in cities around the world. As part of the C40's Sustainable Communities Initiative, it aims to create a model for large-scale urban communities and to support projects that serve as urban laboratories for cities seeking to grow in ways that are environmentally sustainable, climate resilient, and economically viable.

Climate Positive is an exclusive program, with a competitive application process, and currently comprises 17 global projects that will collectively reduce the emissions impact of more than one million people. The cities in which the Climate Positive projects are located support the implementation process locally and share best practices globally through participation in the C40 Climate Positive Network. The projects are in different stages of development, but share key characteristics like high densities, highly efficient buildings, mixed-use zoning and transit accessibility.

== Affiliations ==
=== Partners ===
C40 is a member of The People's Vaccine Alliance. Additional partners include:

- Clinton Foundation
- Institute for Transportation and Development Policy (ITDP)
- International Council for Local Environmental Initiatives (ICLEI)
- International Council on Clean Transportation (ICCT)
- United Cities and Local Governments (UCLG)
- World Bank
- World Resources Institute (WRI)

=== Funding ===
C40's work is made possible by three strategic funders: Bloomberg Philanthropies, Children's Investment Fund Foundation and Realdania.

Additional funding comes from:

- Arup Group
- Axa
- British Department for Business, Energy & Industrial Strategy (BEIS)
- Cities Alliance
- Citigroup
- Climate & Clean Air Coalition
- ClimateWorks Foundation
- European Climate Foundation
- European Institute of Innovation and Technology (EIT)
- Federal Ministry for the Environment, Nature Conservation and Nuclear Safety
- Foreign, Commonwealth and Development Office (FCDO)
- FedEx
- George Washington University
- GIZ
- Global Environment Facility
- Google
- Grundfos
- INGKA Holding
- Johnson & Johnson
- London School of Hygiene & Tropical Medicine
- L'Oréal
- McConnell Foundation
- Michelin
- Ministry of Foreign Affairs of Denmark
- Novo Nordisk
- Oak Foundation
- Open Society Foundations
- Qlik
- Robert Wood Johnson Foundation
- Rockefeller Brothers Fund
- Sainsbury Family Charitable Trusts
- Stavros Niarchos Foundation
- TED Foundation
- Velux
- Wellcome Trust
- William and Flora Hewlett Foundation

== See also ==
- Climate change adaptation
- Climate change mitigation
- Covenant of Mayors
- Energy conservation
- ICLEI – Local Governments for Sustainability
- Individual and political action on climate change
- List of largest cities
- London Climate Change Agency
- PlaNYC
- Renewable energy
- World energy supply and consumption
