= Ambazari Lake =

Lake in India

Coordinates: 21.128980°N 79.042768°E

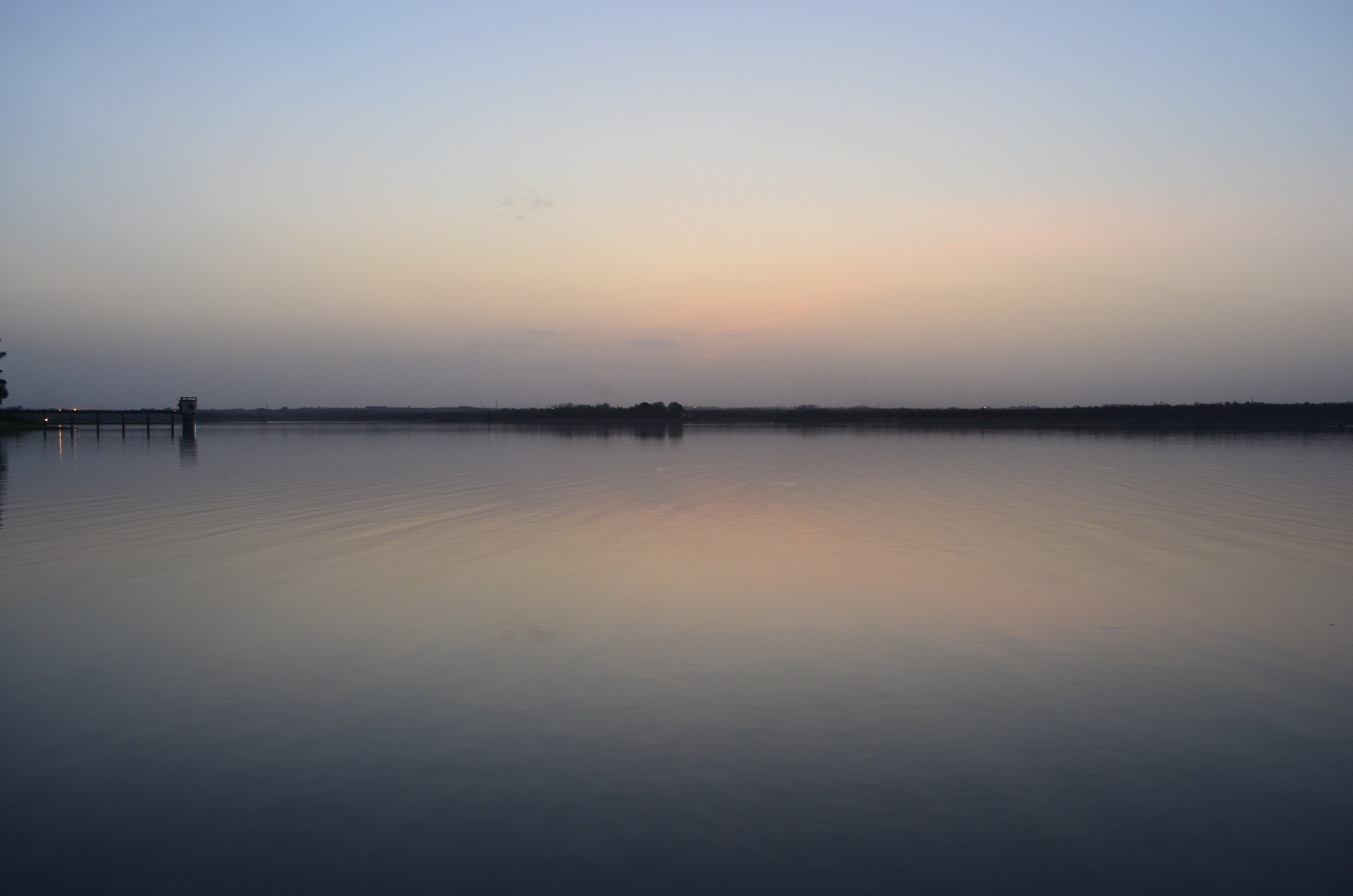
Ambazari Lake

Ambazari lake (Marathi : अंबाझरी तलाव) is situated near the Southwest border of Nagpur, in the state of Maharashtra, India. It is one of the 11 lakes in Nagpur and is the largest lake in the city. The Nag River of Nagpur originates from this lake. This was built in the year 1870, under Bhonsle rule, for supplying water to the city. Government officials and eminent people were supplied water through clay pipes. This lake is near VNIT and surrounded by mango trees, gaining the name Ambazari as "Amba" means "mango" in Marathi.

The lake was used to supply water to Nagpur for over 30 years. The lake is beautiful and serene.

== Garden ==
The lake also has a garden located just beside it known as Ambazari garden. The garden was established in 1958 on an area of 18 acres of land. This place is managed and preserved by the Nagpur Municipal Corporation. The musical fountain, various electric rides, and amusement games were once present in the garden but have been discontinued. The garden is frequented by walkers in the morning and, in the afternoon, it turns into couple spot. Radio speakers were added in the park, which plays soothing music and green gym. This is one of the famous tourist attractions of Nagpur.

== Climate change ==
In a fast-developing Nagpur, communities are in dire need of spaces like Ambazari Garden to connect with nature. Such spaces are vital for recreation and play an important role in addressing rising mental health concerns in urban life. Lakes play a crucial role in regulating high summer temperatures through natural processes such as evaporation, which cools the surrounding air. They help mitigate the urban heat island effect and provide a cooler environment, benefiting both ecosystems and human well-being. Rapid development and cutting trees had polluted the lake in recent years. Biodiversity loss beneath Ambazari Lake is another urgent concern, as preserving its aquatic life is essential for maintaining ecological balance.

== Water Hyacinth problem ==
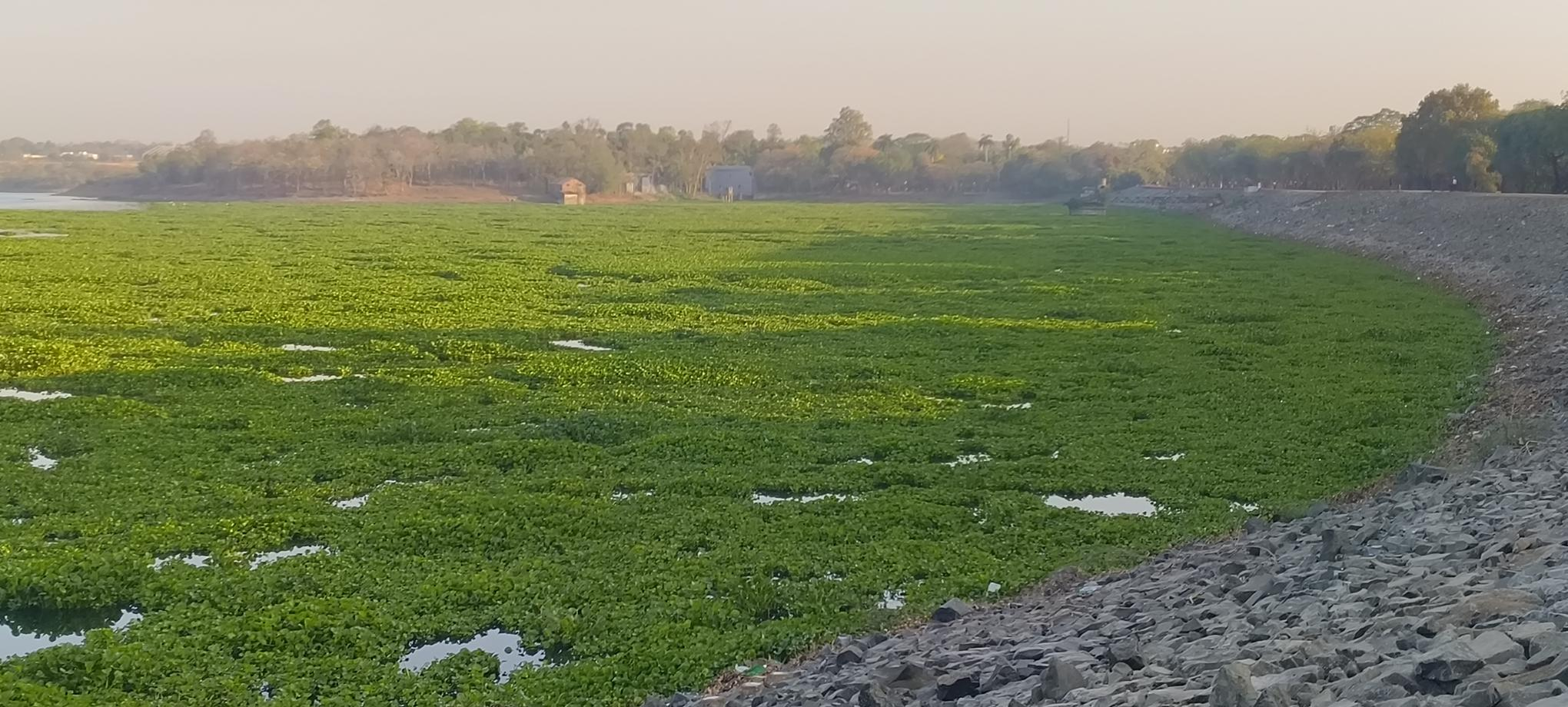
Water Hyacinth Ambazari Lake

The spread of water hyacinth is threatening the lake's health, beauty, and usability. Water hyacinth, though attractive, is considered one of the world's worst invasive aquatic plants because it grows rapidly and forms thick mats on the water's surface. These dense mats block sunlight from reaching underwater plants, reducing oxygen levels in the water and suffocating fish and other aquatic life. They also clog waterways, disrupt boating and fishing activities, and reduce the availability of clean water for irrigation and drinking. In addition, stagnant water trapped under these mats becomes a breeding ground for mosquitoes, increasing the risk of diseases. Overall, water hyacinth causes serious ecological imbalance, economic loss, and health hazards if not controlled.

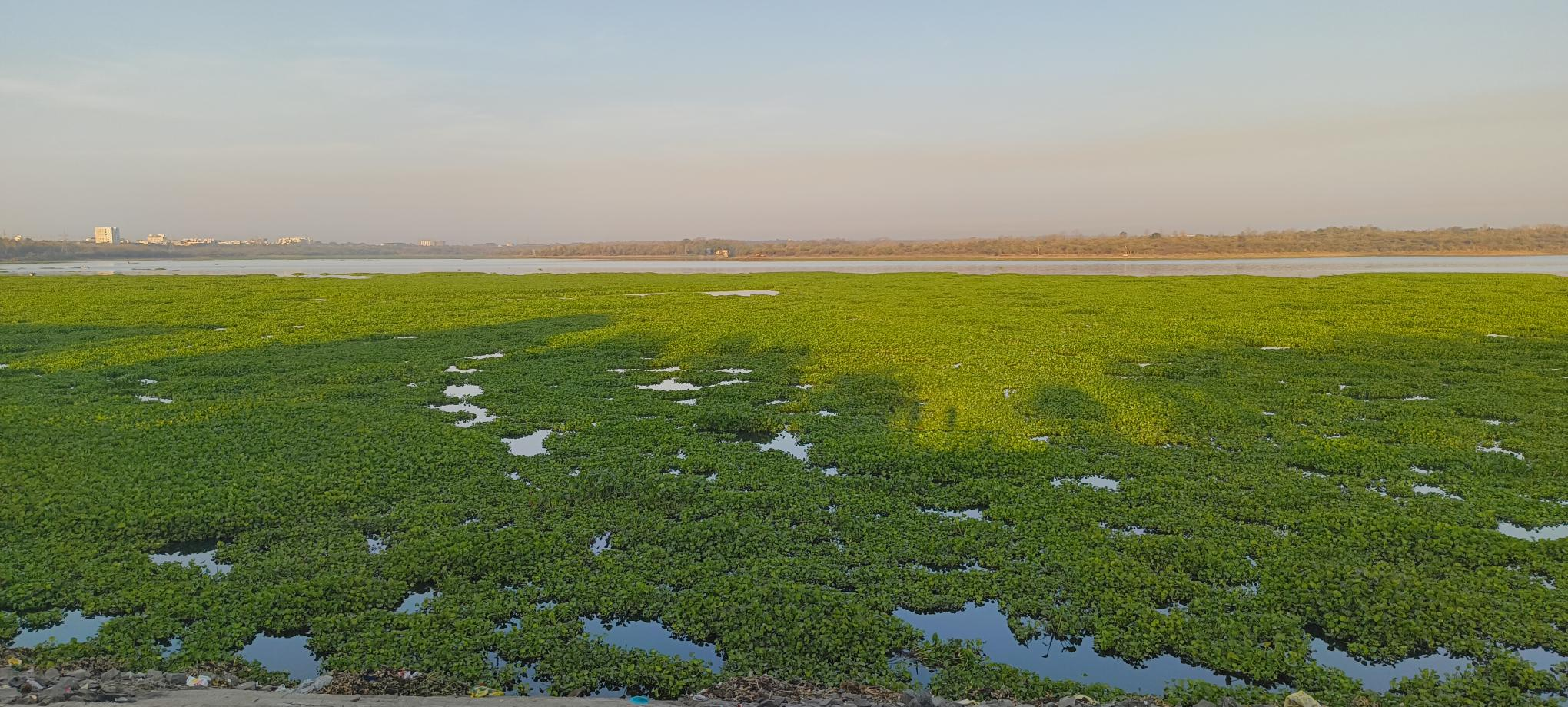
Water Hyacinth in Ambazari Lake

NMC occasionally removes the weed from the lake, but it comes back quickly, hence the need for a systematic approach to tackle this problem.
