= Nagpur Central Assembly constituency =

Constituency of the Maharashtra legislative assembly in India

Coordinates: 21.155°N 79.081°E

Nagpur Central
- Constituency No. 55 for the Maharashtra Legislative Assembly

Constituency details
- Country: India
- Region: Western India
- State: Maharashtra
- District: Nagpur
- Lok Sabha constituency: Nagpur
- Established: 1967
- Total electors: 341,252
- Reservation: None

Member of Legislative Assembly
- 15th Maharashtra Legislative Assembly
- Incumbent Pravin Datke
- Party: BJP
- Alliance: NDA
- Elected year: 2024

Nagpur Central Assembly constituency is one of the 288 Vidhan Sabha (legislative assembly) constituencies of Maharashtra state, western India. It is one of the six assembly seats which make up Nagpur Lok Sabha constituency. The Constituency Number is 55. This constituency is located in Nagpur district. The delimitation of the constituency happened in 2008. It comprises parts of Nagpur Taluka, and Ward No. 66, 92 to 98, 109 to 119 and 121 to 129. of Nagpur Municipal Corporation.

== Members of the Legislative Assembly ==
Year	Member	Party
Until 1967: Constituency did not exist
1967	M. J. Agrawal	Indian National Congress
1972	Navalchandra Toksiya	Indian National Congress
1978	Bhausaheb Surve	Indian National Congress (I)
1980	Yakub Kamar Khan	Indian National Congress (I)
1985	Shoukat Rehman Qureshi	Indian National Congress
1990	Yashwant Narayan Bajirao	Janata Dal
1995	Anees Ahmed	Indian National Congress
1999	Anees Ahmed	Indian National Congress
2004	Anees Ahmed	Indian National Congress
2009	Vikas Kumbhare	Bharatiya Janata Party
2014	Vikas Kumbhare	Bharatiya Janata Party
2019	Vikas Kumbhare	Bharatiya Janata Party
2024	Pravin Datke	Bharatiya Janata Party

== Election results ==
=== Assembly Election 2024 ===
2024 Maharashtra Legislative Assembly election : Nagpur Central
Party	Candidate	Votes	%	±%
BJP	Pravin Datke	90,560	46.31%	▼0.68
INC	Bunty Baba Shelke	78,928	40.36%	▼4.14
Independent	Ramesh Ganpati Punekar	23,302	11.91%	New
NOTA	None of the Above	603	0.31%	▼1.03
Margin of victory		11,632	5.95%	▲3.46
Turnout		196,172	57.49%	▲7.63
Total valid votes		195,569		
Registered electors		341,252		▲5.25
BJP hold		Swing	▼0.68	

=== Assembly Election 2019 ===
2019 Maharashtra Legislative Assembly election : Nagpur Central
Party	Candidate	Votes	%	±%
BJP	Vikas Kumbhare	75,692	46.99%	▼7.72
INC	Bunty Baba Shelke	71,684	44.50%	▲13.59
AIMIM	Abdul Sharique Patel	8,565	5.32%	New
NOTA	None of the Above	2,149	1.33%	▲0.75
BSP	Dharmendra Mandlik	1,971	1.22%	▼2.24
VBA	Kamlesh Harihar Bhagatkar	1,614	1.00%	New
Margin of victory		4,008	2.49%	▼21.31
Turnout		164,511	50.74%	▼4.98
Total valid votes		161,089		
Registered electors		324,233		▲10.77
BJP hold		Swing	▼7.72	

=== Assembly Election 2014 ===
2014 Maharashtra Legislative Assembly election : Nagpur Central
Party	Candidate	Votes	%	±%
BJP	Vikas Kumbhare	87,523	54.70%	▲18.23
INC	Anees Ahmed	49,452	30.91%	▲1.43
BSP	Anjikar Onkar Bhaurao	5,535	3.46%	▼12.11
NCP	Mohammed Kamil Ansari	4,818	3.01%	New
Independent	Abha Bijju (Vijaykumar) Pande	4,449	2.78%	New
SS	Satish Namdevraoji Harde	3,289	2.06%	New
MNS	Shrawan Tukaram Khapekar	2,267	1.42%	▼1.31
NOTA	None of the Above	930	0.58%	New
Margin of victory		38,071	23.79%	▲16.81
Turnout		161,017	55.01%	▲3.95
Total valid votes		159,996		
Registered electors		292,716		▼3.87
BJP hold		Swing	▲18.23	

=== Assembly Election 2009 ===
2009 Maharashtra Legislative Assembly election : Nagpur Central
Party	Candidate	Votes	%	±%
BJP	Vikas Kumbhare	56,312	36.47%	▲0.78
INC	Dr. Ramchandra Alias Raju Narendra Deoghare	45,521	29.48%	▼20.38
BSP	Haji Gani Khan	24,034	15.57%	▲4.85
Independent	Durugkar Ravindra Devidas	9,157	5.93%	New
Democratic Secular Party	Adv. Nanda Chandrabhan Parate	4,939	3.20%	New
MNS	Kishor Rushisao Parate	4,212	2.73%	New
CPI	Anand Narayanrao Jammu	1,715	1.11%	New
Margin of victory		10,791	6.99%	▼7.19
Turnout		154,842	50.85%	▼6.02
Total valid votes		154,405		
Registered electors		304,487		▲117.03
BJP gain from INC		Swing	▼13.39	

=== Assembly Election 2004 ===
2004 Maharashtra Legislative Assembly election : Nagpur Central
Party	Candidate	Votes	%	±%
INC	Anees Ahmed	39,684	49.86%	▲0.76
BJP	Dayashankar Chandrashekhar Tiwari	28,401	35.69%	▼3.14
BSP	Kishor Rishisao Parate	8,530	10.72%	▲9.36
Vidharbha Rajya Party	Ashraf Khan	997	1.25%	New
Womanist Party of India	Gupta Suman	825	1.04%	New
SP	Afzal Farooq	699	0.88%	▼0.82
Margin of victory		11,283	14.18%	▲3.90
Turnout		79,584	56.73%	▲4.11
Total valid votes		79,584		
Registered electors		140,297		▼8.12
INC hold		Swing	▲0.76	

=== Assembly Election 1999 ===
1999 Maharashtra Legislative Assembly election : Nagpur Central
Party	Candidate	Votes	%	±%
INC	Anees Ahmed	39,445	49.10%	▲13.70
BJP	Vikas Kumbhare	31,189	38.82%	▲11.98
JD(S)	Irfan Ahmed Mohd Yakub Kamar	6,345	7.90%	New
SP	Bajirao Yeshwant Narayan	1,361	1.69%	New
BSP	Bansod Rajendra Kashinath	1,088	1.35%	▼2.02
Margin of victory		8,256	10.28%	▲1.73
Turnout		81,357	53.28%	▼10.70
Total valid votes		80,337		
Registered electors		152,701		▼2.17
INC hold		Swing	▲13.70	

=== Assembly Election 1995 ===
1995 Maharashtra Legislative Assembly election : Nagpur Central
Party	Candidate	Votes	%	±%
INC	Anees Ahmed	34,975	35.40%	▲3.86
BJP	Datke Prabhakar Vithobaji	26,528	26.85%	New
JD	Ravindra Ishwarsingh Paigwar	17,443	17.65%	▼13.89
Independent	Dr. Yashwant Bajirao	11,534	11.67%	New
BSP	Ram Hedaoo	3,338	3.38%	▲0.01
Margin of victory		8,447	8.55%	▲8.54
Turnout		100,109	64.14%	▲10.88
Total valid votes		98,812		
Registered electors		156,082		▲15.62
INC gain from JD		Swing	▲3.85	

=== Assembly Election 1990 ===
1990 Maharashtra Legislative Assembly election : Nagpur Central
Party	Candidate	Votes	%	±%
JD	Bajirao Yashwant Narayan	22,323	31.54%	New
INC	Anees Ahmed	22,317	31.53%	▼7.06
INS(SCS)	Umesh Choube	10,135	14.32%	New
SS	Deshpande Vinay Vishweswar	7,738	10.93%	New
BSP	Shakil Ahmed Pappubhai	2,385	3.37%	New
AIML	Shamim Sadique	2,053	2.90%	New
Independent	Gangotri Lokman Tulshiram	1,468	2.07%	New
Margin of victory		6	0.01%	▼3.27
Turnout		71,389	52.88%	▼2.56
Total valid votes		70,771		
Registered electors		134,997		▲14.92
JD gain from INC		Swing	▼7.05	

=== Assembly Election 1985 ===
1985 Maharashtra Legislative Assembly election : Nagpur Central
Party	Candidate	Votes	%	±%
INC	Shoukat Raheman Qureshi	24,927	38.59%	New
IC(S)	Parshiwanikar Vasant Kawadooji	22,811	35.31%	New
RPI	Mirza Azeem Baig	14,221	22.02%	New
Independent	S. Hasan Ali S. Usman Ali	1,991	3.08%	New
Margin of victory		2,116	3.28%	▼24.08
Turnout		65,109	55.42%	▲9.00
Total valid votes		64,595		
Registered electors		117,474		▲7.27
INC gain from INC(I)		Swing	▼12.71	

=== Assembly Election 1980 ===
1980 Maharashtra Legislative Assembly election : Nagpur Central
Party	Candidate	Votes	%	±%
INC(I)	Mohammed Yakub Kamar Khan Mohammed Sardar	25,838	51.30%	▲10.80
BJP	Samarth Manoharrao Nathusao	12,058	23.94%	New
JP	Hedau Sukhman Upasrao	4,220	8.38%	▼27.36
Independent	Lanjwar Bhimshankar Tukaram	4,182	8.30%	New
INC(U)	Parmar Khemchand Mulchand	3,089	6.13%	New
Independent	Baisware Bhola Garibdas	657	1.30%	New
Margin of victory		13,780	27.36%	▲22.60
Turnout		50,766	46.36%	▼26.28
Total valid votes		50,367		
Registered electors		109,514		▲4.58
INC(I) hold		Swing	▲10.80	

=== Assembly Election 1978 ===
1978 Maharashtra Legislative Assembly election : Nagpur Central
Party	Candidate	Votes	%	±%
INC(I)	Surve Bhausaheb Sitaram	30,650	40.50%	New
JP	Ram Hedau	27,047	35.74%	New
AIML	Shamim Sadique Mohammad Alimuddin	14,762	19.51%	New
Independent	Mohammad Salim Ahmad Leader	1,112	1.47%	New
Independent	Toksiya Navalchand Girdharilal	873	1.15%	New
Margin of victory		3,603	4.76%	▼24.36
Turnout		76,911	73.45%	▲11.63
Total valid votes		75,682		
Registered electors		104,718		▼1.04
INC(I) gain from INC		Swing	▼6.13	

=== Assembly Election 1972 ===
1972 Maharashtra Legislative Assembly election : Nagpur Central
Party	Candidate	Votes	%	±%
INC	Navalchandra G. Toksiya	29,926	46.63%	▲7.05
AIFB	Bhagawantrao Gaikawad	11,238	17.51%	New
ABJS	Madhaorao Laxman Rajurkar	7,950	12.39%	New
CPI	Rathinath N. Mishra	5,598	8.72%	New
RPI	Gendlal Shankarrao Kature	3,763	5.86%	▼18.4
Independent	Badruddin Subhan Kazi	2,771	4.32%	New
CPI(M)	Bindaprasad B. Kashyap	1,596	2.49%	New
Margin of victory		18,688	29.12%	▲13.80
Turnout		65,632	62.02%	▼5.59
Total valid votes		64,175		
Registered electors		105,818		▲12.24
INC hold		Swing	▲7.05	

=== Assembly Election 1967 ===
1967 Maharashtra Legislative Assembly election : Nagpur Central
Party	Candidate	Votes	%	±%
INC	M. J. Agrawal	24,722	39.59%	New
RPI	Dr. D. P. Meshram	15,155	24.27%	New
Independent	B. S. Surve	9,791	15.68%	New
Independent	U. D. Choube	5,124	8.20%	New
Independent	R. Jandkar	4,800	7.69%	New
SSP	P. Motghare	2,452	3.93%	New
Margin of victory		9,567	15.32%	
Turnout		65,597	69.58%	
Total valid votes		62,452		
Registered electors		94,280		
INC win (new seat)				
