= Pora River =

River in India

Pora river (Marathi : पोरा नदी) is a river flowing through the Southern part of the city of Nagpur, in Maharashtra, India. Pora river is a right bank tributary of the Nag river.

The origin of the river are untraceable, but it is believed to originate somewhere in the catchment area of the Sonegao Lake Some sources also claim the origin of the river in Yashoda Nagar area of South West Nagpur. The confluence point of Nag and Pora rivers is near Titur. The Nagpur Municipal Corporation has taken the river on its record after finding its presence on the city's topography sheets prepared during the British era. An ancient Nag temple is situated beside Sonegaon road bridge at Sahkar Nagar.

The river is threatened due to negligence from the administrative authorities.
