= 2023 Nagpur flood =

Flood in India

Meteorological history
- Duration: 23 September 2023

Overall effects
- Fatalities: 4
- Areas affected: Nagpur inclusive of Vidarbha Regions

The 2023 Nagpur Flood was a flooding event that occurred in the city of Nagpur in the Indian State of Maharashtra on September 24, 2023. The flood caused deaths and economic destruction with several hundred people being evacuated in various parts of the city.

== Cause ==
The flood was caused due to 109 mm heavy rains in the city, causing the Nag river to overflow into nearby areas, flooding homes, schools commercial areas and hospitals. An ill-planned storm water drainage system and encroachment along the Nag river that blocks the flow of the river. Additionally, unchecked growth of Eichhornia weed in the Ambazari lake, caused by sewage intrusion, flowed with the current and blocked major discharge points along the Nag river which also contributed to the flooding.

== Aftermath ==
There were four recorded deaths and more than 400 people were evacuated from their homes by rescue and relief teams including the National Disaster Response Force (NDRF) and State Disaster Response Force (SDRF). An estimated 10000 houses were affected. A relief fund of ₹10,000 was announced for affected families and ₹5,00,0000 for affected business owners. A bridge on the Nag river collapsed, blocking a major highway in the city. The retaining wall of Nag river had collapsed at various locations. On November 5, 2023, a flood mitigation project worth ₹266.63 crore was announced for repairs to infrastructure and improving drainage deepening of the Nag river, strengthening the dam at Ambazari, desilting of the Ambazari lake and removal of encroachments.
