= Pravin Datke =

Indian politician (born 1978)

Pravin Bhau Saheb Datke

Member of Maharashtra Legislative Assembly
- Incumbent
- Assumed office 23 November 2024
- Preceded by: Vikas Kumbhare
- Constituency: Nagpur Central

Member of Maharashtra Legislative Council
- In office 14 May 2020 – 23 November 2024
- Preceded by: Arun Adsad
- Succeeded by: Sandip Joshi
- Constituency: elected by Legislative Assembly members

President of Bharatiya Janata Party – Nagpur City
- In office 23 June 2019 – 19 July 2023
- President: Raosaheb Danve; Chandrakant Patil; Chandrashekhar Bawankule
- Preceded by: Sudhakar Kohale
- Succeeded by: Jitendra Kukde

Mayor of Nagpur
- In office 5 September 2014 – 4 March 2017
- Preceded by: Anil Sole
- Succeeded by: Nanda Jichkar

Personal details
- Born: 16 December 1978 (age 47) Nagpur, Maharashtra, India
- Party: Bharatiya Janata Party
- Spouse: Pravada Datke
- Children: 2 daughters
- Parent: Prabhakar Datke (father)
- Profession: Politician

Pravin Prabhakarrao Datke (born 16 Dec 1978) is elected as Member of Legislative Assembly from Nagpur Central Constituency, former National Vice President Bharatiya Janata Yuva Morcha and former Municipal Corporator and former Mayor of Nagpur Municipal Corporation. He was State General Secretary BJYM Maharashtra Unit.

He got elected to the Legislative Council by MLA's (unopposed) on 14 May 2020.

== Early life ==
Datke was born to Prabhakarrao Datke, a founder of Shikshak Sahakari Bank Limited, Nagpur. His father, Prabhakarrao Datke, died of heart attack in 1999.

== Education and early career ==
Datke is a 10th pass from Navyug Madhyamik Vidyalaya, Mahal, Nagpur.

== Family and personal life ==
Pravin is the son of former BJP Leader Late Sh. Prabhakarrao Datke. Sh Prabhakarrao was also known as Teachers Union Leader & founder of NAGPUR Shikshak SahakarI Bank Limited..

== Political career ==
In 2004, at age 25, Pravin Datke was elected as a corporator from Mahal ward. After two terms Datke later became the mayor of the Nagpur Municipal Corporation. 20 November he was elected to Nagpur Central Constituency.

=== Positions held ===
==== Within BJP ====
- Nagpur President, BJYM (2010)
- General Secretary, BJYM, Maharashtra (2010-2016)
- General Secretary, BJYM, Maharashtra (2016-2017)
- National Vice President, BJYM (2017 onwards)
- Nagpur City President, BJP (2020 onwards)

==== Legislative ====
- Corporator in Nagpur Municipal Corporation since 2004
- Mayor, City of Nagpur – (2014-2017)
