= Nag River =

River in Maharashtra, India

Coordinates: 21°06′N 79°28′E

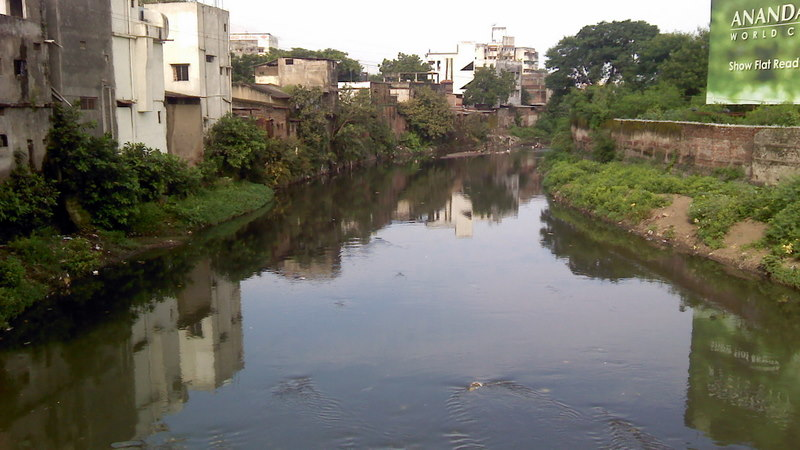
Nag River

The Nag River (Marathi : नाग नदी) is a river flowing through the city of Nagpur in Maharashtra, India. It is known for providing the etymology for the name Nagpur.

Forming a part of the Kanhan-Pench river system, the Nag River originates in Lava hills near wadi. The confluence point of the Nag and Pioli rivers is near Pawangaon, the confluence point of Nag and Pora river is near Titur, and the confluence point of Nag and Kanhan River is near Sawangi village. In November 2015, various efforts have been made to restore the river to the city's heritage list from which it was removed in 2001.

The river serves as drainage for Nagpur and as a result its ecosystem is heavily polluted by urban waste from the city

== Rejuvenation and beautification ==
The Nag River Rejuvenation was cleared by National River Conservation Directorate in November 2019 at the cost of Rs 2434 crores. This cost was escalated from an earlier estimate of 1476.96 crores. This was because of delay in approvals and inclusion of the Goods and Service Tax. Share of Centre in the project is 60%, 25% of state and remaining 15% of NMC. Japan International Cooperation Agency is expected to approve long term loan for shares of Centre and State, which they will repay. NMC will only have to contribute its share of 15%. The project also covers rejuvenation of Pioli River along with Nag river and is estimated to take four years to complete. the Nagpur Municipal Corporation (NMC) is also preparing Nag Riverfront Development Project of Rs1,600 crore. France-based AFD (French Development Agency) is preparing the Detailed Project Report and likely to approve long term loan for the project. After the 2023 Nagpur flood a flood mitigation plan was announced for removing encroachments along the river and deeping and desilting it at various places.
