= List of mayors of Nagpur =

Mayor of Nagpur
- Incumbent; Neeta Thakre
- Style: Madam/Sir Mayor
- Appointer: Chief Minister
- Term length: 2.5 years
- Formation: 1948; 78 years ago
- Website: www.nmcnagpur.gov.in

The Mayor of Nagpur is the first citizen of the Indian city of Nagpur. The mayor is the chief of the Nagpur Municipal Corporation. The mayor's role is largely ceremonial as the real powers are vested in the Municipal Commissioner.

The mayor is elected from within the ranks of the council in a quinquennial election. The elections are conducted in all regions in the city to elect corporators. The mayor is generally the leader of a party (or coalition of parties) that has a majority. Currently, the post of mayor is ruled by the Bharatiya Janata Party.

== List ==
#	Portrait	Name	Term of office			Election	Party
1		B. S. Surve	31 January 1964	8 February 1965	1 year, 8 days		
2		B. K. Takkamore	9 February 1965	30 September 1965	233 days		
Vacant
3		Tejsingrao Laxmanrao Bhosle	15 April 1969	6 February 1970	297 days		
4		S. M. Meshram	7 February 1970	6 January 1971	333 days		
5		Haribhau Naik	7 January 1971	30 November 1971	327 days		
6		Pundlik Masurkar	4 December 1971	6 January 1972	33 days		
7		Bhaurao Mulak	7 January 1972	14 February 1973	1 year, 38 days		
8		K. R. Pandav	15 February 1973	5 February 1974	355 days		
9		M. M. Kinkhede	6 February 1974	13 February 1975	1 year, 7 days		
10		B. M. Gaikwad	14 February 1975	7 March 1976	1 year, 22 days		
11		Ramratan Janorkar	8 March 1976	13 January 1977	311 days		Republican Party of India
12		Sardar Atal Bahadur Singh	14 February 1977	6 February 1978	357 days		
13		Shriram Vaidya	7 February 1978	7 February 1979	1 year, 0 days		
14		S. M. Chahande	8 February 1979	17 February 1980	1 year, 9 days		
15		A. A. Antik	18 February 1980	11 February 1981	359 days		
Vacant
16		Sakharam Chaudhari	15 May 1985	2 February 1986	263 days		
17		Tejram Somkuwar	3 February 1986	1 February 1987	363 days		
18		Pandurang Hivarkar	2 February 1987	30 January 1988	362 days		
19		M. M. Jadhav	25 April 1989	6 November 1989	195 days		
20		Babanrao Yewale	3 February 1990	30 January 1991	361 days		
21		Vallabhdas Daga	31 January 1991	1 March 1992	1 year, 30 days		
22		Sudhakarrao Nimbalkar	2 March 1992	3 February 1993	338 days		
23		Kishor Dorle	4 February 1993	2 February 1994	363 days		
24		Sardar Atal Bahadur Singh	3 February 1994	20 January 1995	351 days		
25		Rajesh Tambe	20 January 1995	4 February 1996	1 year, 15 days		
26		Kundatai Vijaykar	5 February 1966	9 February 1997	1 year, 4 days		
27		Devendra Fadnavis	5 March 1997	4 February 1999	1 year, 336 days	1997	Bharatiya Janata Party
28		Kalpana Pande	29 April 1999	27 March 2000	333 days	1997	Bharatiya Janata Party
29		Vasundhara Masurkar	28 March 2000	6 March 2001	343 days	1997	Bharatiya Janata Party
30		Pushpa Ghode	7 March 2001	4 March 2002	362 days	1997	Bharatiya Janata Party
31		Vikas Thakre	5 March 2002	19 February 2005	2 years, 351 days	2002	Indian National Congress
32		Naresh Gawande	20 February 2005	4 March 2007	2 years, 12 days	2002	Indian National Congress
33		Devrao Umredkar	5 March 2007	16 June 2007	103 days	2007	Bharatiya Janata Party
34		Maya Iwnate	15 July 2007	23 December 2009	2 years, 161 days	2007	Bharatiya Janata Party
35		Archana Dehankar	24 December 2009	4 March 2012	2 years, 71 days	2007	Bharatiya Janata Party
36		Anil Sole	5 March 2012	5 September 2014	2 years, 184 days	2012	Bharatiya Janata Party
37		Pravin Datke	5 September 2014	4 March 2017	2 years, 180 days	2012	Bharatiya Janata Party
38		Nanda Jichkar	5 March 2017	22 November 2019	2 years, 262 days	2017	Bharatiya Janata Party
39		Sandip Joshi	22 November 2019	5 January 2021	1 year, 44 days	2017	Bharatiya Janata Party
40		Dayashankar Tiwari	5 January 2021	4 March 2022	1 year, 58 days	2017	Bharatiya Janata Party
41		Neeta Thakre	6 February 2026	Incumbent	213 days	2026	Bharatiya Janata Party
