= Global Covenant of Mayors for Climate & Energy =

- Abbreviation: GCoM
- Founded: 22 June 2016, Brussels Predecessors: 23 September 2014, NYC (Compact of Mayors); 2008 (EU's Covenant of Mayors)
- Type: International organization
- Purpose: Climate change
- Region served: Participating member cities
- Method: Emissions reduction & reporting guidance; standardized climate risk analysis; public reporting of local climate impact
- Key people: UN Secretary General Ban Ki-moon (Co-founder); Former New York City Mayor Michael Bloomberg (Co-founder); Mayor Eduardo Paes (Chair, C40 Cities Climate Leadership Group); Mayor Kadir Topbaş (President, United Cities and Local Governments); Mayor Anne Hidalgo (Co-President, United Cities and Local Governments); Mayor Ashok-Alexander Sridharan (President of ICLEI); Dr. Joan Clos (Executive Director of United Nations Human Settlements Programme)
- Website: www.globalcovenantofmayors.org

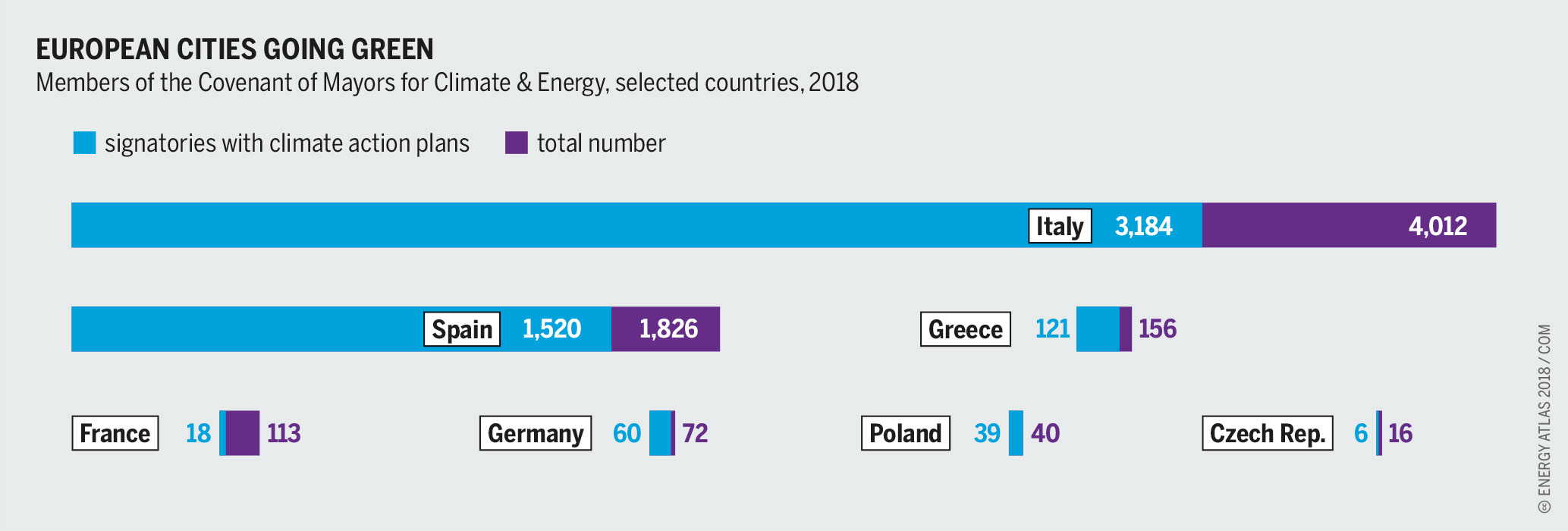
European cities going green

The Global Covenant of Mayors for Climate & Energy (GCoM) was established in 2016 by bringing formally together the Compact of Mayors and the European Union's Covenant of Mayors. It is a global coalition of city leaders addressing climate change by pledging to cut greenhouse gas emissions and prepare for the future impacts of climate change. The Compact highlights cities' climate impact while measuring their relative risk levels and carbon pollution. The Compact of Mayors seeks to show the importance of city climate action, both at the local level and around the world. The Compact was launched in 2014 by UN Secretary General Ban Ki-moon and former New York City Mayor Michael Bloomberg, the UN Special Envoy for Cities and Climate Change. The Compact represents a common effort from global city networks C40 Cities Climate Leadership Group (C40), ICLEI, and United Cities and Local Governments (UCLG), as well as UN-Habitat, to unite against climate change. 12,500 cities and local governments have committed to the Compact of Mayors. These cities hail from 6 continents and 144 countries. In total, they represent more than 1 billion people.

== History ==
The Compact of Mayors was launched by Ban Ki-moon and Mike Bloomberg on 23 September 2014 at the UN Climate Summit 2014. The announcement detailed a commitment by 228 cities to cut up to 13 gigatons of carbon emissions by 2050. Mayors Eduardo Paes of Rio de Janeiro, Brazil, Anne Hidalgo of Paris, France and Park Won-soon of Seoul, South Korea joined in the announcement, representing C40, UCLG, and ICLEI. UN-Habitat provided additional support and oversight for the launch of the Compact.

On 8 December 2014, World Resources Institute, C40 Cities, and ICLEI revealed the Global Protocol for Community Scale Greenhouse Gas Emission Inventories (GPC), identified as the first set of standardized global rules for cities to measure and publicly report their carbon pollution emissions. This standard is the baseline on which Compact of Mayors was founded.

At the C40 Latin American Mayors Summit on 27 March 2015, Compact of Mayors officials launched the first public recruiting effort, receiving commitments from twenty Latin American mayors to join the Compact and accelerate their push toward low-carbon economies. On 30 June 2015, Mike Bloomberg and Mayor Anne Hidalgo jointly announced their plans to host a Climate Summit for Local Leaders on 4 December at Paris City Hall. The summit will convene mayors from around the world at the COP21 climate negotiations and build upon existing climate commitments under the Compact of Mayors.

At the National Clean Energy Summit in Las Vegas on 24 August 2015, President Barack Obama challenged 100 cities to commit to the Compact of Mayors as part of a larger push to advance clean energy across the United States. Rio de Janeiro became the first city to achieve full compliance with the Compact on 26 August 2015.

Vice President of the United States Joe Biden called out the success of the Compact of Mayors in promoting action against climate change during his address at the US-China Climate Leadership Summit in Los Angeles on 15 September 2015. Later that month, on 28 September 2015, Mike Bloomberg announced the launch of a new parent organization combining the efforts of the Compact of Mayors and the Compact of States and Regions at NYC Climate Week.

Vice President Biden also cited the success of the Compact of Mayors while speaking on 5 November 2015 at the National League of Cities Congress of Cities in Nashville, Tennessee, USA. On 20 November 2015, the Compact of Mayors was recognized by the White House for exceeding 100 U.S. member cities prior to the COP 21 climate negotiations in Paris.

Mayors and other leaders of hundreds of cities committed to the Compact of Mayors attended the Climate Summit for Local Leaders at Paris City Hall on 4 December 2015 during COP21. At the Climate Summit for Local Leaders, Leonardo DiCaprio welcomed climate action commitments made by 392 cities under the Compact of Mayors, and he urged the local leaders in attendance to do more to fight climate change.

Following the Climate Summit, 428 global cities had committed to the Compact of Mayors, representing over 376 million people worldwide.

The Compact of Mayors officially merged with the Covenant of Mayors on 22 June 2016 in Brussels, Belgium. The newly created Global Covenant of Mayors for Climate and Energy unites more than 7,100 cities in 119 countries across six continents in the shared goal of fighting climate change through coordinated local climate action. The initiative represents more than 600 million residents, or more than 8 percent of the world's population. As of March 2024, the commitment has expanded to include over 12,500 cities and local governments. These cities hail from 6 continents and 144 countries. In total, they represent more than 1 billion people.

== Leadership ==
The Compact of Mayors was launched by UN Secretary General Ban Ki-moon and Mike Bloomberg. The organization receives oversight from ICLEI, United Cities and Local Governments, and C40 Cities Climate Leadership Group. UN-Habitat has provided founding and operational support. Mayor Eduardo Paes of Rio de Janeiro currently serves as the chairperson of C40 Cities, while Mayor Kadir Topbas of Istanbul, Turkey and Mayor Anne Hidalgo of Paris, France currently serve as president and co-president of United Cities and Local Governments. Mayor Ashok-Alexander Sridharan of Bonn, Germany is the current president of ICLEI, and Ms Maimunah Mohd Sharif serves as the current executive director of UN-Habitat. Mayor Nanda Jichkar of Nagpur, India is a board member of Global Covenant of Mayors.

== Controversy ==
In 2020, the Covenant received international condemnation for bowing to Chinese pressure and updating the six member cities in Taiwan from their original designation as being cities in "Chinese Taipei" to cities in "China". Taiwanese premier Su Tseng-chang criticized the changes as "extremely improper". The decision was reversed a few days later with assistance from the European Union. Foreign Minister of Taiwan Joseph Wu said “We are happy to learn that they have changed our name back to the original title".

== See also ==
- C40 Cities Climate Leadership Group
- Fossil Fuel Non-Proliferation Treaty Initiative
- ICLEI – Local Governments for Sustainability
- United Cities and Local Governments
- UN Habitat
- United Nations
