= Anees Ahmed =

Indian politician

Member of the Maharashtra Legislative Assembly
- In office (1995-1999), (1999-2004), (2004 – 2009)
- Preceded by: Yashwant Narayan Bajirao
- Succeeded by: Vikas Kumbhare
- Constituency: Nagpur Central

Personal details
- Born: Anees Majeed Ahmed; 20 June 1962 (age 64) Nagpur, Maharashtra, India
- Party: Indian National Congress
- Education: B.Com, M.BA, L.L.B, M.A (Political Science), M.A.(Public Administration)

Anees Majeed Ahmed (born 20 June 1962) is an Indian politician from Maharashtra. He was the member of the Maharashtra Legislative Assembly from Nagpur Central in Nagpur district for three terms. He represent the Indian National Congress. He is a devoted Congress leader, Anees Ahmed is on the top of the league.

== Political career ==
- President of Hislop College Cultural Committee for centenary celebrations in 1983-84
- University Representative of Hislop College in 1984
- President of Nagpur University Students’ Council in 1984
- President of NSUI Maharashtra Unit from 1987–97
- Contested first Assembly election from Central Nagpur in 1989
- Elected for first time as MLA from Central Nagpur in 1994
- President of Maharashtra Pradesh Youth Congress from 1997–99
- Elected as MLA for consecutive second time in 1999
- Minister of State for Higher and Technical Education from 2001–04
- Guardian Minister of Bhandara district from 2001–04
- Elected as MLA for consecutive third time in 2004
- Cabinet Minister of Maharashtra for Animal Husbandry, Fisheries, and Dairy Development, and Aukaf from 2004–08
- Guardian Minister of Chandrapur district from 2004–09
- Member of State Haj Committee
- Cabinet Minister for Textiles, Minority Welfare, Sports and Youth Welfare, Employment and Self-employment, ex-Servicemen Welfare

from 2008–09

- All India Congress Committee Secretary.
