= London Climate Change Agency =

Former municipal company

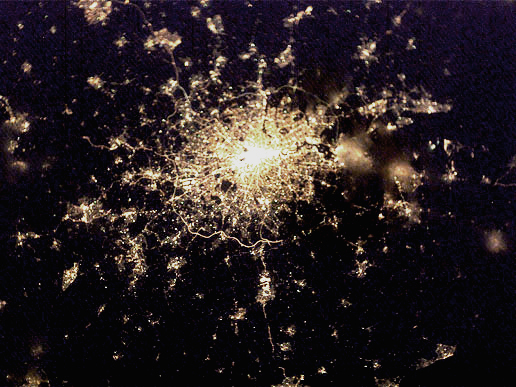
London by night seen from the International Space Station

The London Climate Change Agency Limited (LCCA), was a municipal company owned by the London Development Agency (LDA) that worked in partnership with private sector companies (notably EDF Energy) to design, finance, construct, own and operate decentralised low energy and zero-carbon projects for London, as well as providing services to others. It operated in the areas of energy, water, waste and transport. In 2009 it was integrated into the London Development Agency.

The Agency was launched on 20 June 2005 to implement a manifesto commitment by Ken Livingstone in the 2004 elections for the Mayor of London. Its budget for 2006–07 was £815,000, 63% of which was funded directly by the LDA. The Chief Executive Officer was Allan Jones, who previously led the development of the pioneering sustainable community energy system in Woking. The London Climate Change Agency plans to create a similar system for London.

As of 2006, London produced 7% of the UK's carbon emissions. The LCCA was seen as one of the key vehicles for delivering the Mayor's energy strategy, which targets cuts in these emissions of 20% by 2010 and 60% by 2050 (although achieving the first of these targets was unlikely). The Agency was also expected to play a role in ensuring that the 2012 Summer Olympics in London were the first to be powered by low carbon technology.

== Renewable energy installations ==
In 2007 the LCCA received planning permission for a number of renewable energy installations including: solar photovoltaic cells at City Hall, the UK's first combined photovoltaic and wind turbine system at the Palestra building, Blackfriars Road

== See also ==
- Energy policy of the United Kingdom
- Energy use and conservation in the United Kingdom
- Large Cities Climate Leadership Group
- Zero energy building
