= ICLEI =

International sustainability organization

ICLEI – Local Governments for Sustainability
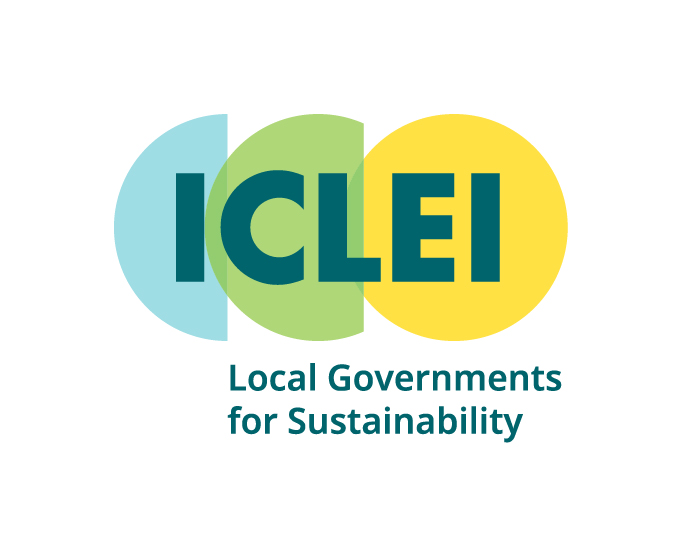
- Formation: 1990, New York City, U.S.
- Type: International organization
- Location: Kaiser-Friedrich-Str. 7, 53113 Bonn, Germany
- Region served: International
- Secretary General: Gino Van Begin
- President: Katrin Stjernfeldt Jammeh
- Employees: approximately 400 (worldwide)
- Website: www.iclei.org
- Formerly called: International Council for Local Environmental Initiatives

ICLEI – Local Governments for Sustainability (ICLEI, originally International Council for Local Environmental Initiatives) is an international non-governmental organization that promotes sustainable development. ICLEI provides technical consulting to local governments to identify and meet sustainability objectives. It has a strong focus on biodiversity and has worked across local, national, and global levels. ICLEI was the first and is the largest transnational network of local governments engaging in climate action.

ICLEI is considered a bridging organization, playing important roles in knowledge sharing and in intermediation processes between local initiatives and regulatory actors. It has recognized the significance of cities for urban sustainability and helped to support their activities for over three decades.

The international association was established when more than 200 local governments from 43 countries convened at its inaugural conference, the World Congress of Local Governments for a Sustainable Future, at the United Nations in New York in September 1990. As of 2020, more than 1,750 cities, towns, counties, and their associations in 126 countries are a part of the ICLEI network. As of 2023, over 2,500 cities towns and regions were listed as members.

== Membership ==
According to the organization's website, the ICLEI members "steer the direction of our work, shape our strategy and support the mission, mandate and principles set in our statutes. They are eligible to vote and take part in our network-wide governing bodies." The only requirements for ICLEI membership are a self-defined commitment to climate protection and the payment of annual membership dues. Dues are determined through a fair share model, based on the type of organization and its population size and income level.

Cities and municipalities are recognized as key stakeholders with a significant role to play in implementing climate change policies and reducing emissions, through energy, transportation, land use, construction, waste management and education. Participation in city networks like ICLEI, with their potential for sharing of best practices, peer exchange, and joint projects, rose significantly in the 2000s. As of 2020, ICLEI counted more than 1,750 local governments within its network. As of 2023, over 2,500 cities towns and regions were listed as members.

== History and structure ==
ICLEI was founded in September 1990 as the "International Council for Local Environmental Initiatives" when over 200 local governments from 43 countries met at the inaugural World Congress of Local Governments for a Sustainable Future at the United Nations in New York. ICLEI's World Secretariat headquarters were initially located in Toronto, Canada. ICLEI went on to create an international training center in Freiburg, Germany and has added further secretariats such as the Latin America and the Caribbean Secretariat in Brazil in 2001. ICLEI now has more than 20 offices around the world. The ICLEI World Secretariat is located in Bonn, Germany.

The United States branch, ICLEI USA, is a 501(c)(3) nonprofit membership organization of the international organization of the same name. The U.S. office opened formally in 1995. ICLEI USA's Executive Office is based in Denver, Colorado. U.S. local government members include cities, towns, and counties of all sizes, from New York City and Los Angeles County to Dubuque, Iowa, Austin, Texas, Oberlin, Ohio and Burlington, Vermont.

In 2003, ICLEI's local government members voted to revise the organization's mission, charter and name to better reflect the current challenges local governments face, and the broader topic of sustainability. The "International Council for Local Environmental Initiatives (ICLEI)" was renamed "ICLEI – Local Governments for Sustainability", with a broader mandate to address sustainability issues, not only environmental issues. For its 30th anniversary, ICLEI adopted a new logo (released officially in February 2021) which emphasizes the organization's connections in terms of its members, offices and elements (represented by the logo's colors: water, air and climate (blue), nature (green) and cities (yellow)).

== Programs ==
ICLEI promotes programs for local-level adoption and implementation, providing tested, practical advice for connecting international agreements and targets with initiatives and actions at local levels. The network develops and shares operational manuals, guidelines, best practices, and methods for monitoring and assessing progress. ICLEI is unique in having held observer status as a local government network for all three of the Rio Conventions. This contributed to the formation of the UN Framework Convention on Climate Change, the UN Convention on Biological Diversity, and the UN Convention to Combat Desertification.

ICLEI supports Agenda 21, from which it developed the Local Agenda 21 (LA21) framework for use by local governments. ICLEI's Local Agenda 21 Planning Guide (1996) discusses formation of "partnerships, community-based issue analysis, action planning, implementation and monitoring, and evaluation and feedback." The LA21 framework is "grounded in a broad inclusive process of consultation" which can help local stakeholders to identify common goals, reconcile differences and create working partnerships. Sharing of information throughout the network enables members to learn from both successes and failures of other local initiatives. ICLEI has also supported the Habitat Agendas (I, II and III) the Johannesburg Plan of Implementation, and the Millennium Development Goals, which were succeeded in 2015 by the Sustainable Development Goals.

ICLEI provides oversight for the Compact of Mayors, a global coalition of city leaders founded to address climate change at the local level, as well as acting as the focal point for the Local Governments and Municipal Authorities (LGMA) Constituency, which has represented networks of local and regional governments at the UNFCCC process since 1995.

=== Resilient cities ===
ICLEI is recognized for realizing the significance of cities for urban sustainability and for supporting their initiatives through ongoing efforts for over 30 years. ICLEI launched the campaign "Cities for Climate Protection" in 1993, following an earlier project on urban CO_{2} reduction. The campaign identified five milestone steps for cities attempting to reduce local greenhouse gas emissions:

1. Conduct a baseline emissions inventory and a forecast for one year, for use as a benchmark
2. Identify an emissions reduction target for the forecast year
3. Engage with stakeholders to develop an action plan
4. Implement policies and actions from the action plan
5. Monitor and verify results

In 2002, ICLEI coined the term "resilient cities" and launched the Resilient Cities initiative. They identified resilience as the city's ability to respond "creatively, preventively and proactively to change or extreme events, thus mitigating crisis or disaster". Consideration of resilience can include not only climate change mitigation and adaptation and disaster risk reduction but also issues like food security and housing. In 2010, ICLEI and the city of Bonn, Germany hosted the first Resilient Cities conference.

ICLEI is a proponent of the Cities Race to Zero campaign, encouraging cities to actively engage in planning to become Zero-carbon cities. They are actively involved in gathering and analyzing data to assess changing conditions and the impact of initiatives.

=== Ecomobility ===
Ecomobility means travelling through integrated, socially inclusive, and environmentally friendly transport options, including and integrating walking, cycling, public transport and other climate and people friendly innovative modes of transport. By enabling citizens and organizations to access goods, services, and information in a sustainable manner, ecomobility supports citizens' quality of life, increases travel choices, and promotes social cohesion.

ICLEI's agenda promoting ecomobility in cities is titled the EcoMobile City (sustainable transport) Agenda. Under this agenda, ICLEI supports activities such as the EcoMobility Alliance, the EcoMobility World Festival and the EcoMobility World Congress.

The EcoMobility Alliance was formed in October 2011 in Changwon, Korea at the World Congress on Mobility for the Future of Sustainable Cities. The first chair of the alliance was Wan-su Park, then Mayor of Changwon. The EcoMobility Alliance was a transformation of the earlier Global Alliance for EcoMobility, which was a non-governmental organization founded and launched in Bali on 10 December 2007, on the occasion of the 2007 United Nations Climate Change Conference (UNFCCC-COP-13).

The first EcoMobility World Festival occurred in Suwon, South Korea in 2013 where a neighborhood in the city was transformed and became largely car-free for a month. At mid-festival, the area of Haenggung-dong was reported to be 95% car-free, and local businesses reported that the number of customers had increased, reflecting additional foot traffic and the presence of visitors. It was followed by events in Johannesburg, South Africa in 2015 and Kaohsiung, Taiwan in 2017.

== Governance ==
ICLEI is a democratic organization whose governing bodies are the ICLEI Council and the Global Executive Committee (GexCom), two groups of local leaders elected by ICLEI Members every three years. The ICLEI Council is formed by elected members from the Regional Executive Committees (RexCom) for the ICLEI regions. As of 2023, these are Africa; East Asia; Europe; Mexico, Central America and the Caribbean; North America (Canada and the USA); Oceania; South America; South Asia; and Southeast Asia.

One representative from each RexCom is then elected as a regional representative to the ICLEI Global Executive Committee (GexCom), along with portfolio holders who are elected to the GexCom by the members of the ICLEI Council based on their thematic expertise. The ICLEI GexCom and Council have the power to represent ICLEI on the global stage and steer the organization by setting ICLEI global strategy and policies.

The Council convenes every three years at an ICLEI World Congress and establishes ICLEI's priorities and direction through the adoption of a six-year Strategic Plan. The most recent ICLEI World Congress was held in Montreal from 19 to 22 June 2018. Due to the COVID-19 pandemic, the ICLEI World Congress will be held in two parts: the first one held virtually from 13 to 15 April 2021, while the second one will take place in Malmö, Sweden, in 2022. Members elect 21 representatives to serve on the executive committee, which oversees the implementation of the Strategic Plan and ICLEI operations.

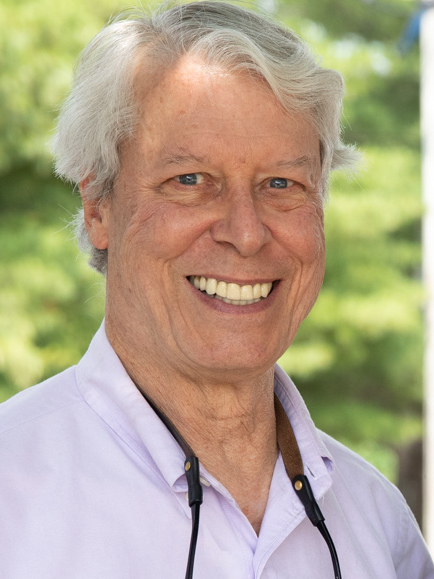
Frank Cownie, President of ICLEI, 2021–2024

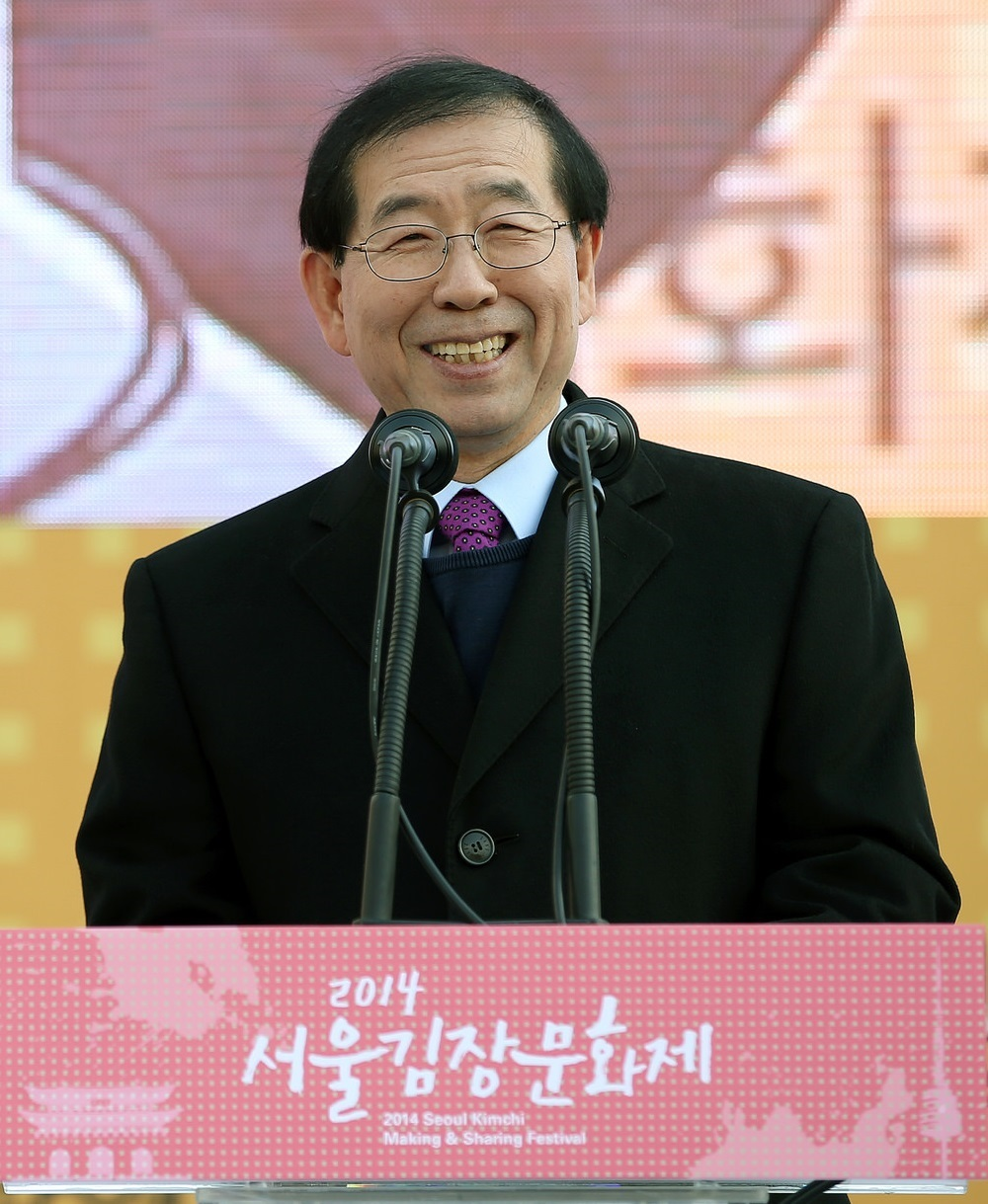
Park Won-soon, President of ICLEI 2015–2018

Every three years, ICLEI elects a Presidium, consisting of a president, first vice-president, and two further vice-presidents. In 2024, Katrin Stjernfeldt Jammeh, Mayor of Malmö Municipality in Sweden, was elected as president. From 2018 to 2021, Ashok Sridharan, the Mayor of Bonn, Germany, served as ICLEI jpresident. In 2021, Frank Cownie, mayor of Des Moines, Iowa, was elected president and served until 2024.

The founding Secretary General of ICLEI, Jeb Brugmann, served from 1990 to 2000. He was succeeded by Sean Southey (2001), Konrad Otto-Zimmermann (2002–2012), and Gino Van Begin (2013–).

== Conspiracy theories ==
ICLEI has been a target of conspiracy theories related to its support for Agenda 21, a nonbinding United Nations initiative that seeks to promote responsible resource and land conservation. Agenda 21 is used worldwide and considered favorably for city planning. The framework encourages local communities to develop concrete strategies to meet their needs, through public involvement, open decision-making, partnerships and networking.

The Tea Party movement, the John Birch Society, and others have promoted a variant of the New World Order conspiracy theory, in which they claim that ICLEI and Agenda 21 are part of a secret UN conspiracy, "something sinister and dark", that seeks to undermine private property rights and individual liberties. They have opposed sustainability planning efforts at local city and regional government levels, claiming that local planning prevents "genuine citizen input". They have introduced legislation to cancel membership in ICLEI and to block smart city planning in many US states. They have opposed measures such as the expansion of public transportation, creation of bike lanes and bike share programs, and the preservation of open green space in cities. While the peak period of activity around the Agenda 21 conspiracy theory was in 2012–2013, the COVID-19 pandemic was quickly incorporated into false narratives about Agenda 21, helping the conspiracy theory to regain visibility.
