= Nagpur Municipal Corporation =

Local civic body in Nagpur, Maharashtra, India

Nagpur Municipal Corporation Nāgapūra Mahānagar Pālikā
- Emblem of Nagpur Municipal Corporation

Type
- Type: Municipal Corporation of the Nagpur
- Established: March 1951; 75 years ago

Leadership
- Mayor: Neeta Thakre, BJP
- Deputy Mayor: Leela Hathibed, BJP
- Municipal Commissioner: Abhijeet Chaudhari, IAS since July 2023

Structure
- Seats: 151
- Political groups: Government (102): BJP (102); Opposition (49): INC (34); AIMIM (6); IUML (4); SS(UBT) (2); BSP (1); SHS (1); NCP (1)

Elections
- Last election: 15 January 2026
- Next election: 2031

Website
- www.nmcnagpur.gov.in

Nagpur Municipal Corporation (NMC) is the municipal body administering Nagpur, in Maharashtra state in Central India.

== History ==
The Municipal Council of Nagpur was established in 1864 to govern city encompassing 15.5 km^{2} and a population was 82,000 residents.

Post-independence, the council was upgraded to a Municipal Corporation in March 1951. The first development plan of the city was prepared in 1953. With the reorganization of the Indian states on linguistic basis in 1956, Nagpur became part of the erstwhile Bombay State. Subsequently, Nagpur became part of the state of Maharashtra in 1960.

Nagpur Municipal Corporation was incorporated under the Maharashtra Municipal and Corporations and Municipal Councils (Amendment) Act, 1994. Historically, it was incorporated under the City of Nagpur Corporation Act, 1948 while it was part of Bombay Province.

== Organization ==
=== Administrative Wing ===
The executive branch of the local body is headed by a Municipal commissioner, an IAS officer. The officers of the corporation are appointed by the state government from deputed Central services, while other employees are part of the State civil service.

Various departments such as public relations, library, health, finance, buildings, slums, roads, street lighting, traffic, establishment, gardens, public works, local audit, legal services, waterworks, education, octroi, and fire services manage their specific activities. The activities of NMC are administered by its zonal offices.

NMC divides the city into 10 zones and which are served by zonal offices

1. Laxmi Nagar
2. Dharampeth
3. Vandaniya Rashtrasant Tukdoji Maharaj (Hanuman Nagar)
4. Dhantoli
5. Nehru Nagar
6. Gandhi Baugh
7. Sataranjipura
8. Lakadganj
9. Ashi Nagar
10. Mangalwari

As per NMC's records, it has 10,450 employees at present (against a requirement of 12596) across more than 20 departments.

=== Deliberative Wing ===
A quinquennial election is held to elect corporators to power. They are responsible for overseeing that their constituencies have the basic civic infrastructure in place and that there is no lacuna on the part of the authorities. The mayor is selected from the party with the largest vote. A largely ceremonial post, he has limited duties.

Each zone is divided into several wards for a total of 38 wards. Each ward is represented by 4 elected corporators

== Election results ==
Elections to the Nagpur Municipal Corporation have been pending since 2022. In October 2025, the State Election Commission decided that 37 wards would elect four corporators each, while one ward would have three, making up a 151-member general body. Five corporators would also be nominated." The final ward formation or delimitation of the wards was also released.

=== 2025 results ===
Party	Seats
Bharatiya Janata Party (BJP)	102
Indian National Congress (INC)	35
All India Majlis-e-Ittehadul Muslimeen (AIMIM)	6
Indian Union Muslim League (IUML)	4
Shivsena	2
Nationalist Congress Party	1
Shiv Sena	1
Total	151

==== Councillors elected in 2025 elections ====
Sl. No.	Ward Number	Councillor Name	Political Party
1	1 A		
2	1 B		
3	1 C		
4	1 D		
5	2 A		
6	2 B		
7	2 C		
8	2 D		
9	3 A		
10	3 B		
11	3 C		
12	3 D		
13	4 A		
14	4 B		
15	4 C		
16	4 D		
17	5 A		
18	5 B		
19	5 C		
20	5 D		
21	6 A	Rekha Patil	Indian Union Muslim League
22	6 B	Ansari Mohammad Mujtaba	Indian Union Muslim League
23	6 C	Saima Fayyaz Qureshi	Indian Union Muslim League
24	6 D	Aslam Khan Mulla	Indian Union Muslim League
25	7 A	Kalpana Dronkar	Indian National Congress
26	7 B		

=== 2017 results ===
The results of the 2012 and 2017 elections are shown.

Party	Seats	+/-
Bharatiya Janata Party (BJP)	108	▲46
Indian National Congress (INC)	29	▼12
Bahujan Samaj Party (BSP)	10	▼2
Shiv Sena (SHS)	2	▼4
Nationalist Congress Party (NCP)	1	▼5
Independents (Ind)	1	▼9
Total	151	

=== 2012 results ===
Party	Seats
Bharatiya Janata Party (BJP)	62
Indian National Congress (INC)	41
Bahujan Samaj Party (BSP)	12
Nationalist Congress Party (NCP)	6
Shiv Sena (SHS)	6
Maharashtra Navnirman Sena (MNS)	2
Indian Union Muslim League (IUML)	2
Other regd.parties	4
Independents (Ind)	10
Total	145

== Responsibilities ==
As per the CNC Act, 1948, the key responsibility for providing basic urban services to Nagpur's citizens lies with the Nagpur Municipal Corporation. The NMC is responsible for administering and providing basic infrastructure to the city:

1. Building and Maintenance of roads, streets and flyovers.
2. Public Municipal schools.
3. Water purification and supply.
4. Hospitals.
5. Street lighting.
6. Maintenance of parks and open spaces.
7. Sewage treatment and disposal.
8. Garbage disposal and street cleanliness.
9. Urban development and city planning of new areas.
10. Registering of births and deaths.

The NMC co-ordinates with various other government organizations like NIT, MHADA, MSRTC, the Traffic Police, MPCB, etc. for delivering these basic urban services.

== Finances ==
In 2004–05, NMC's revenues registered a compounded annual growth rate (CAGR) of 6.9 percent and revenue expenditure increased at a CAGR of 9.0%. In spite of this, due to a strong revenue base in form of taxes, there was a revenue surplus of INR 78 crores and an overall surplus of INR 18.98 crores (including capital account). Revenue income is primarily earned by NMC or for NMC by some external sources. Among own sources, the largest source is octroi (47%) followed by property tax (18%).

In 2004–05, a capital expenditure of INR 79 crores was incurred, mainly covering water supply, public works, and roads. The cost recovery of services varies across sectors. For example, water expenditure exceeds revenue income each year, making it financially unsustainable. However, sewerage charges exceed the operation and maintenance expense but the current sewer coverage of the system is quite low.

=== Revenue sources ===
- Tax revenue sources
  - Local Body Tax
  - Property Tax
  - Entertainment tax.
  - Profession tax.
  - Advertisement tax.
- Non-tax revenue sources
  - Grants from Central and State Government
  - Water usage charges.
  - Fees from Documentation services.
  - Rent received from municipal property.
  - Funds from municipal bonds.

== See also ==
- Nagpur Improvement Trust
- Nagpur Metropolitan Region Development Authority
