= Candico =

Indian confectionery company

Candico India
- Headquarters: Delhi, India

Candico is a confectionery manufacturer based in Delhi, India. Candico was founded in 1997.
