= Major State Highway 10 (Maharashtra) =

Road in Maharashtra, India

Major State Highway 10

Route information
- Maintained by MSRDC

Major junctions
- South-West end: Nandgoan, Amravati
- NH 53
- North-East end: Pusla Village, Amravati

Location
- Country: India
- State: Maharashtra
- Districts: Amravati.
- Primary destinations: Nandgoan, Morshi, Warud and Pandhurana in Madhya Pradesh

Highway system
- Roads in India; Expressways; National; State; Asian; State Highways in Maharashtra

Maharashtra Major State Highway 10, commonly referred to as MH or MSH-10, is a major state highway that runs north east through Amravati districts in the state of Maharashtra. This state highway touches numerous cities and villages Viz. Nandgoan, Morshi, Warud and then proceeds north-west towards Maharashtra-Madhya Pradesh state border. This highway enters in Madhya Pradesh State near Bangoan village which is on border of Amravati district of Maharashtra and Chhindwara district of Madhya Pradesh and ends at Bangoan village which is just 15 km East of Pandhurna in Madhya Pradesh.

== Summary ==
This highway is passing along with Upper Wardha Dam popularly known as Nal Damyanti Sagar Dam.

== Route description ==
Below is the brief summary of the route followed by this state highway.

=== Amravati District ===
This highway starts off from intersection of National Highway 47 near Nandgoan village and proceeds North-West towards Pusla village in Warud Taluka.

== Major junctions ==
=== National highways ===
National Highway NH-53 near Nandgoan village, Amravati district.

=== State highways ===
1. State Highway-244 at Warud city, Warud taluka, Amravati District.
2. State Highway-247 at Warud city, Warud taluka, Amravati District.
3. State Highway-240 at Morshi city, Morshi taluka, Amravati District.
4. State Highway 24A at Nandgoan village, Amravati taluka, Amravati District.

== Connections ==
Many villages, cities and towns in various districts are connected by this state highway.

- Nandgoan
- Morshi
- Warud

== See also ==
- List of state highways in Maharashtra
