= Somwarkheda =

Village in Maharashtra

Coordinates: 21°20′N 77°21′E

Somwarkheda or Somwar Kheda is a village located in Chikhaldara Tehsil of Amravati district in Maharashtra, India. It is situated 38 km away from sub-district headquarter Chikhaldara and 73 km away from district headquarter Amravati. As per 2009 stats, Somwar Kheda is the gram panchayat of Somwarkheda village.

The total geographical area of the village is 764 hectares. Somwarkheda has a total population of 1,132 people. There are about 262 houses in Somwarkheda village. Achalpur is nearest town to Somwarkheda which is approximately 20 km away.

== Demographics of Somwar Kheda ==
English is the Local Language here. Total population of Somwarkheda is 953. The male population is 490 and the female population is 463 living in 177 Houses. Total area of Somwarkheda is 763 hectares.

== Post Offices Near Somwarkheda ==
Village Post Office : -	Pin Code
Chikhaldara	444807
