= Bulumgavhan =

Village in Maharashtra

Coordinates: 21.6373437°N 76.9990153°E

Bulumgavhan is a village in the Dharni taluka, Melghat area of Amravati district in Maharashtra state.

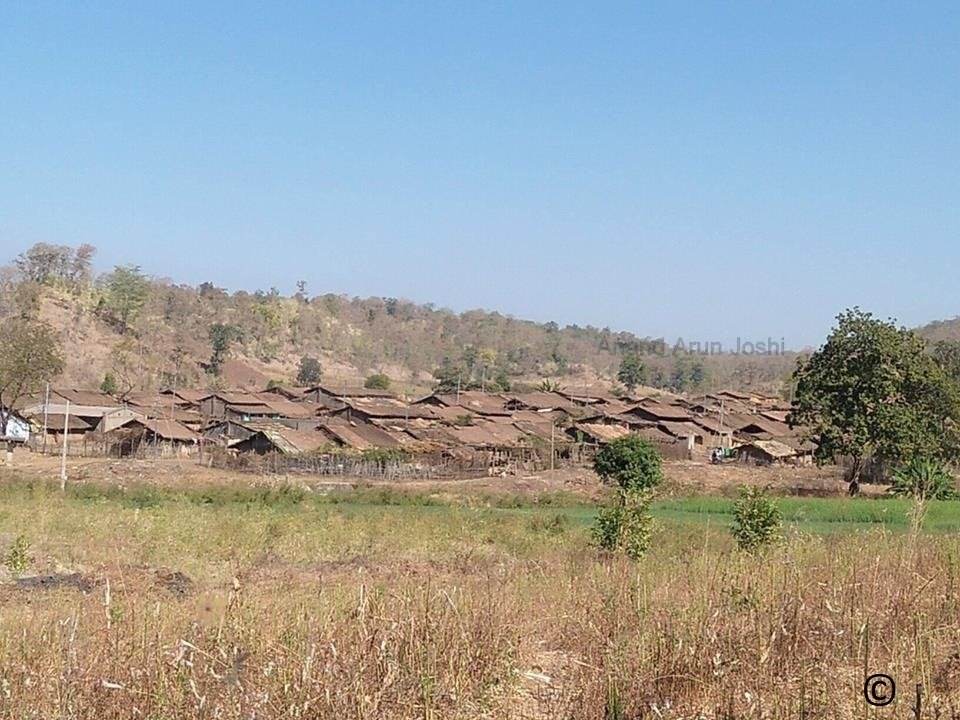
Bulumgavhan

Electricity became available on 14 April 2018. As the then Chief Minister Devendra Fadnavis appointed the rural development fellow under the Maharashtra Village Social Transformation Foundation. One of the CM fellows, Anand Arun Joshi, worked on it with the help of local government.

== Population ==
The village has 92 families and a population of 589. Most of the Korku families live here.

== Educational facilities ==
Primary schooling up to 8th standard is in the village. There is also an Anganwadi.

== Transportation ==
The closest airport to Bulumgavhan is the Dr. Babasaheb Ambedkar International Airport, and the nearest railway station is the Badnera Junction railway station.

The local Amravati area is served by the MSRTC bus service.
