= Ellichpur District =

Former district of British India

Coordinates: 21°15′N 77°30′E

Ellichpur District अचलपूर जिल्हा
- District of British India
- 1867–1905
- Flag

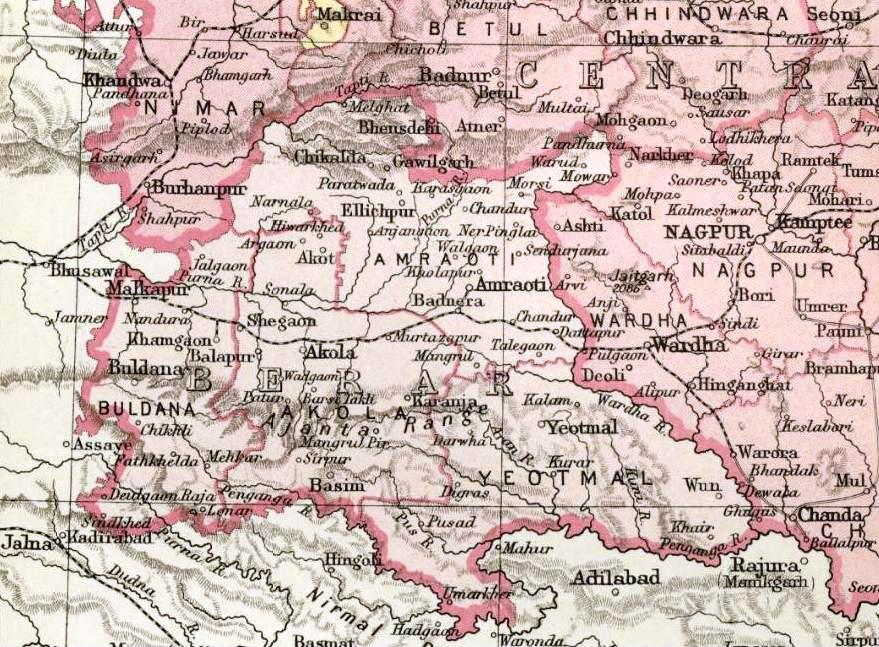
- Ellichpur District in the Imperial Gazetteer of India
- Area
  - 1901: 6,747 km^{2} (2,605 sq mi)
- Population
  - 1901: 297,403
- History
  - Creation of the district from East Berar: 1867
  - Merged with Amravati district: 1905
Preceded by	Succeeded by
East Berar District	Hyderabad State

Ellichpur District is a former district of British India. It encompassed the western portion of present-day Amravati District in Maharashtra state. Ellichpur (Achalpur) was the administrative headquarters of the district.

Ellichpur District had an area of 6,747 km^{2} with a population of 315,616 in 1891, which was reduced to 297,403 in 1901 owing to the 1899–1900 famine.

== History ==
Ellichpur District was part of the province of Berar, which came under British administration in 1853, although it nominally remained part of the Kingdom of Hyderabad until 1903. Ellichpur was immediately included in East Berar District, which included all of present-day Amravati District, with its administrative headquarters at Amravati (Amravati). Ellichpur District was created in 1867 when the taluks of Ellichpur, Daryapur, Melghat, and Morsi were separated from East Berar District. Morsi taluk was retransferred to Amravati after a short time.

Melghat taluk was situated in the Satpura Range, while the taluks of Ellichpur and Daryapur are located on the Payanghat, the central valley of Berar. Ellichpur was the administrative headquarters of Ellichpur Taluk, Daryapur that of Daryapur Taluk, and Chikalda that of Melghat Taluk. The district included six towns, Ellichpur, Paratwada, Anjangaon, Karasgaon, Sirasgaon, and Chandurbazar. The historic fortress of Gawilgarh was located in Melghat taluk. It was dissolved in August 1905 and merged with Amravati district.

== See also ==
- Berar Division
