= Bhilona =

Village in Maharashtra, India

- Village

Gavrani Marathi transcription(s)
- Interactive map of Bhilona
- Coordinates: 21.2208°N 77.4444°E
- Country: India
- State: Maharashtra
- District: Amravati District

Area
  - Total: 502.46 ha (1,241.6 acres)

Population
  - Total: 1,598

Bhilona is a medium-sized village located in Achalpur Taluka of Amravati district, Maharashtra. Bhilona belongs to Amravati Division and is located 54 km (34 mi) towards North from District headquarters Amravati, 4 km (2.5 mi) from Achalpur and 629 km (391 mi) from Maharashtra's capital at Mumbai

== Demographics ==
Bhilona's language is gavrani marathi. According to a census in 2011, Bhilona's total population is 1598 and number of houses are 374. Female Population is 49.4%. Village literacy rate is 76.3% and the Female Literacy rate is 35.2%.
