= Akhatwada =

Village in Maharashtra

- village
- Location in Maharashtra, India
- Coordinates: 21.203354°N 77.714752°E
- Country: India
- State: Maharashtra
- District: Amravati

Population (2011)
  - Total: 723

Languages
  - Official: Marathi
- Time zone: UTC+5:30 (IST)
- Postal code: 444704
- Vehicle registration: MH27

Akhatwada is a medium-sized village located in Chandurbazar Taluka of Amravati district, Maharashtra, India with a total of 173 families. The Akhatwada village has population of 723, of which 380 are males and 343 are females, per the 2011 census. The main language spoken is Marathi, but English and Hindi are also spoken.
