= Gugamal National Park =

National park in India

Coordinates: 21°24′20″N 77°08′55″E

- IUCN category II (national park)
- Interactive map of Gugamal National Park
- Location: Amravati, Maharashtra, India
- Area: 361.28
- Established: 1974

Gugamal National Park is an Indian national park that is one of seven protected areas in the Melghat Tiger Reserve. Founded on 22 February 1974, this park is located in the Chikhaldara and Dharni tehsils of Amravati, Maharashtra.

== Wildlife ==
=== Flora ===
The forest in rugged and hilly area of Melghat is typical southern dry tropical deciduous forest. It consists mainly of teak, ain, Indian gooseberry, lendia, dhawada, and kusum trees. Bamboo is widespread in the forests. Some orchids and strobilanthes are present in the upper hills. The area is rich in medicinal plants.

=== Fauna ===
The area is rich in wild mammals including the Bengal tiger, Indian leopard, sloth bear, Ussuri dhole, Indian jackal, Asian elephant, four-horned antelope, sambar, gaur, barking deer, honey badger, flying squirrel, cheetal, nilgai, wild boar, langur, rhesus monkey, and macaques. Also found here are 25 types of fishes and many varieties of butterflies. Crocodiles were re-introduced in a systematic manner in March 1990 and February 1991 in Siddu Kund in Gadga river near Dhakna and Hathikund in the Dolar river in the Gugamal National Park.
