= Amravati division =

Varhad
- Amravati Division
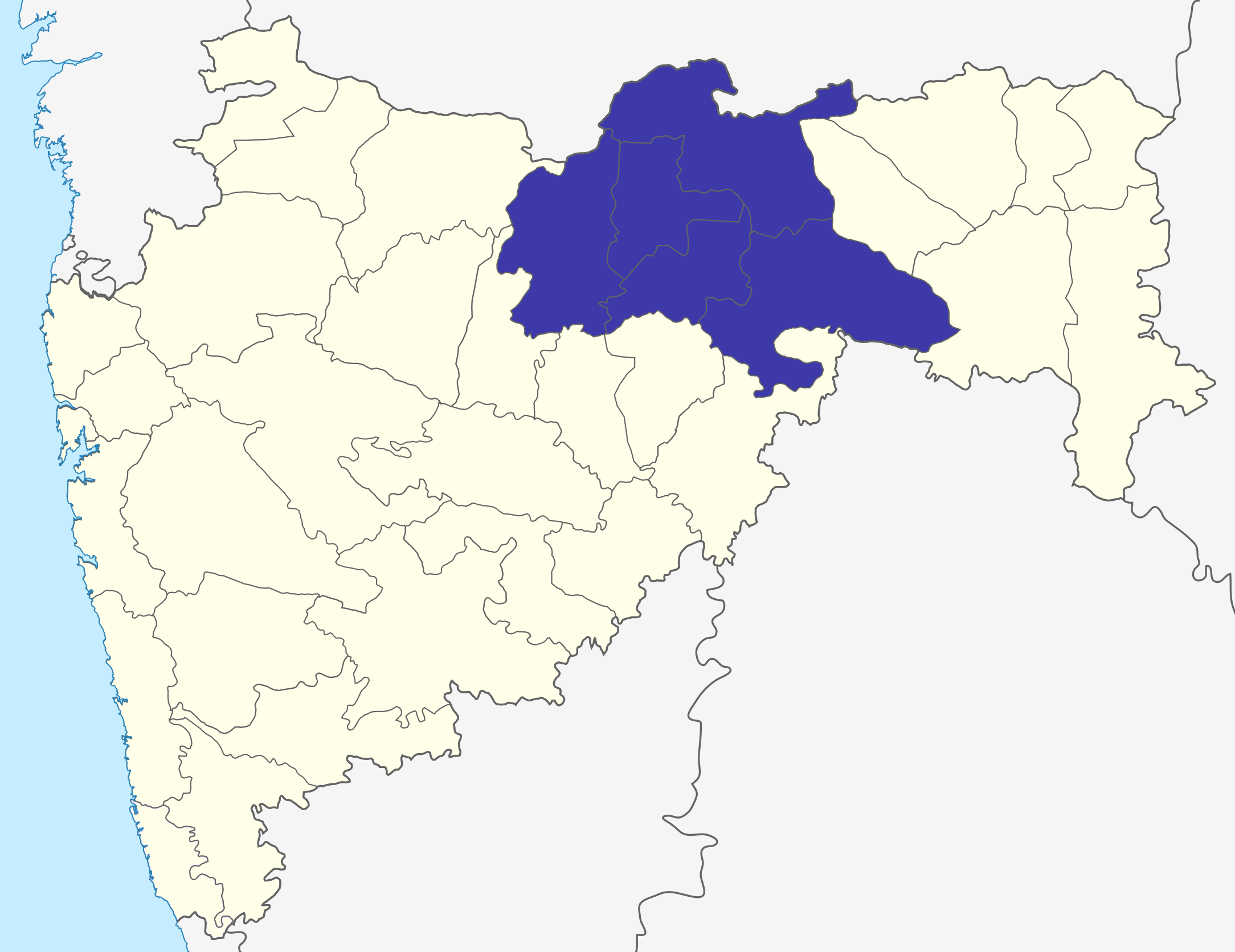
- Location of Amravati Division in Maharashtra

- Location of the divisional headquarters in Maharashtra, India
- Coordinates: 20°55′00″N 77°45′00″E
- Country: India
- State: Maharashtra

Government
  - Commissioner Amravati Division: NA
  - Police Commissioner Amravati Division: NA
  - All Guardian Minister Amravati Division: Devendra Fadnavis; (Amravati district): Devendra Fadnavis; (Akola district): Rajendra Shingne; (Buldhana district): Shankarrao Gadakh Additional charge; (Yavatmal district): Sunil Chhatrapal Kedar Additional charge; (Washim district)
  - All District Collector's Amravati Division: Mr. Saurabh Katiyar (IAS); (Amravati District): Ms. Nima Arora (IAS); (Akola District): Ms. Suman Rawat Chandra (IAS); (Buldhana District): Mr. Amol Yedge IAS; (Yavatmal District): Mr. Shanmugarajan S. IAS; (Washim District)
  - All MP's Amravati Division: Balwant Wankhede; (Amravati): Anup Dhotre; (Akola): Prataprao Jadhav; (Buldhana): Sanjay Deshmukh; (Yavatmal-Washim): Amar kale; (Wardha)

Area
  - Total: 46,090 km^{2} (17,800 sq mi)

Population (2011)
  - Total: 11,258,117
  - Density: 244.3/km^{2} (632.6/sq mi)

Languages
  - Official: Marathi
- Time zone: UTC+5:30 (IST)
- ISO 3166 code: IN-MH

Amravati Division, also known as Varhad, is an Indian one of the six administrative divisions of Maharashtra state in India. Amravati and Nagpur divisions constitute the ancient Vidarbha region. Amravati Division is bound by Madhya Pradesh state to the north, Nagpur Division to the east, Telangana state to the southeast, Marathwada region (Aurangabad Division) to the south and southwest, and Nashik Division to the west.

- Area: 46,090 km^{2}
- Population (2011 census): 11,258,117
- Districts: Akola, Amravati, Buldhana, Washim, Yavatmal
- Largest City: Amravati
- Literacy: 93.03%
- Area under irrigation: 2,582.02 km^{2}
- Railways: broad gauge 249 km, meter gauge 227 km, narrow gauge 188 km.

== History ==
Amravati Division roughly corresponds to the former province of Berar, which was ruled by the Maratha Maharajas of Nagpur till 1803. In 1853, it was occupied by the British, who decided to administer the province although it remained under the nominal sovereignty of the Nizam of Hyderabad.

In 1903, Berar Province was renamed Berar Division and added to the British-administered Central Provinces, which in 1936 was renamed Central Provinces and Berar. Upon Indian independence, the Central Provinces and Berar were reorganised as the Indian state of Madhya Pradesh. In 1956 the Indian states were reorganised on linguistic grounds, and Amravati and Nagpur divisions were transferred to Bombay State, which was split on linguistic lines into the states Maharashtra and Gujarat in 1960.

Amravati is the largest city in the division followed by Akola and Yavatmal.

Chikhaldara, the only hill station in Vidarbha, is situated in Amravati District. Also the famous Melghat Tiger Reserve is situated in Amravati and Akola districts.

== Demographics ==
As per the 2011 Census of India, Amravati Division had a population of 11,258,117 in the year 2011.

=== Languages ===
Marathi is the most spoken language, which is also the sole official language of the region. There are significant minorities of Urdu and Hindi speakers in Amravati Division.

=== Religion ===
At the time of the 2011 Census of India, 72.12% of the population of Amravati Division followed Hinduism, 13.45% Islam, 13.37% Buddhism, 0.19% Christianity and the remaining 0.87% of the population followed other religions or stated no religion.

Religion in Amravati Division (2011)
1. Hinduism (72.1%)
2. Islam (13.4%)
3. Buddhism (13.4%)
4. Christianity (0.19%)
5. Other or not stated (0.89%)

== Administration ==
A Divisional Commissioner, an IAS officer appointed by the Government of Maharashtra, administers the division. Divisional Commissioners have included:

- Ganesh P. Thakur (2011–2012)
- D. R. Bansod (2013–2014)
- Dnyaneshwar Sadashivrao Dhok Rajurkar (2014–present)

The division is subdivided into five districts:

- Akola
- Amravati
- Buldhana
- Yavatmal
- Washim

== See also ==
- Make In Maharashtra
- Central Provinces and Berar
