= Dharni taluka =

Dharni Taluka
- Taluka
- Country: India
- State: Maharashtra
- District: Amravati
- Headquarters: Dharni

Area
  - Total: 1,495.55 km^{2} (577.44 sq mi)

Population (2011)
  - Total: 184,665
  - Density: 123.476/km^{2} (319.802/sq mi)
- Literacy rate: 64.49%
- Sex ratio: 967

Dharni is a taluka in Amravati district, Maharashtra, India. It lies in the Satpura Range and is heavily forested and mainly tribal. Its headquarters are at Dharni. Melghat Tiger Reserve is part of this taluk.

== Demographics ==
Religions in Dharni taluka (2011)
Religion	Percent
Hinduism	92.84%
Islam	5.45%
Buddhism	1.31%
Other or not stated	0.40%

At the time of the 2011 census, the taluka had a population of 184,665, of which 15,761 (8.53%) lived in urban areas. Dharni had a sex ratio of 967 females per 1000 males and a literacy rate of 64.49% for the population 7 years and above. 14.81% of the population was under 6 years of age. Scheduled Castes and Scheduled Tribes made up 4.28% and 77.00% of the population respectively.

Languages of Dharni taluka (2011)
1. Korku (68.9%)
2. Hindi (8.55%)
3. Marathi (6.72%)
4. Gondi (4.40%)
5. Nimadi (3.87%)
6. Urdu (3.36%)
7. Others (4.17%)

At the time of the 2011 Census of India, 68.93% of the population spoke Korku, 8.55% Hindi, 6.72% Marathi, 4.40% Gondi, 3.87% Nimadi and 3.36% Urdu as their first language.
