= Semadoh =

Village in Maharashtra

Semadoh is a village located in dense Melghat Tiger Reserve in Chikhaladara Tahsil, Amravati District, Maharashtra.

Near Semadoh on the banks of Sipna River is a Forest Jungle camp consisting of four Dormitories (60 Bed) and Ten cottages (20 bed). The cottages have been recently renovated and are in good condition. There is a museum next to the cafeteria (mess). Most important is presence of wildlife in the area like Tigers, Sloth bear, leopards, and other jungle animals. Bookings can be done through Forest Department Amravati.
