= Dhulghat railway station =

Railway station in Maharashtra, India

General information
- Location: Dhulghat, Amravati, Maharashtra; India
- Coordinates: 21.2958°N 76.7500°E
- Elevation: 408 metres (1,339 ft)
- System: Indian Railways station
- Owner: Indian Railways
- Operator: South Central Railway
- Line: Akola–Ratlam rail line
- Platforms: 2
- Tracks: 4

Construction
- Structure type: Standard (on-ground station)
- Parking: No
- Cycle facilities: No

Other information
- Status: Active
- Station code: DGT
- Zone(s): South Central Railway
- Division(s): Nanded

History
- Electrified: Ongoing
Location
- Location within India Location within Maharashtra

Dhulghat railway station is a small railway station in Amravati district, Maharashtra, India. Its code is DGT. It serves Deulghat town. The station consists of one platform. The platform is not well sheltered. It lacks many facilities including water and sanitation.

Dhulghat Spiral is a unique spiral located on Akola–Ratlam metre-gauge section of South Central Railway of India. It is also called 'Char Cha Akda' in Marathi and 'Char Ka Aankda' in Hindi.
