= Chandrabhaga River (Purna River tributary) =

Chandrabhaga
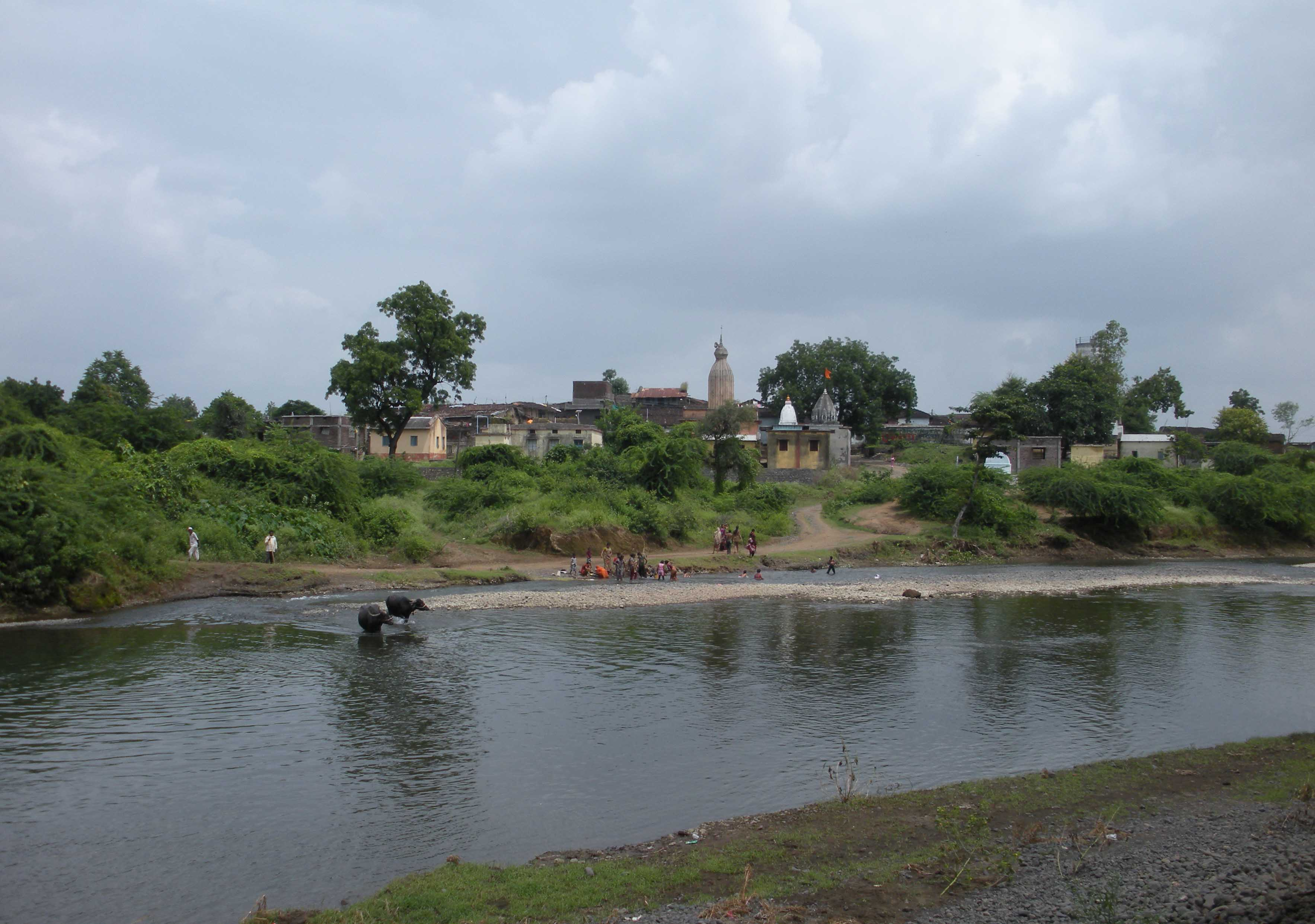
- Chandrabhaga river at Chamak Khurd in Amravati district.

Location
- Country: India
- State: Maharashtra
- Region: Vidarbha
- District: Amravati
- City: Daryapur

Physical characteristics
- Source
  - location: Chikhaldara hills, Maharashtra, India
  - coordinates: 21°23′0″N 77°16′1″E
- Mouth
  - location: Purna river
  - coordinates: 20°51′20.75″N 77°15′3.3″E

Basin features
- Tributaries
  - left: Bhuleshwari

Chandrabhaga is one of the major rivers in Amravati district of Maharashtra. As a tributary of the Purna, it forms a part of the Tapti-Purna river system.

The main stream of the river rises down the Vairat Plateau in the Chikhaldara hills and takes an eastward course draining the south slopes of Chikhaldara and Gawilgarh plateaus. dam is built on the river as it comes out of the valley. The river takes a more southward turn from the dam and passes through the town of Daryapur before it meets with river Purna on the border of Amravati and Akola district. Bhuleshwari is a chief tributary of Chandrabhaga that meets it before Daryapur. Sapan and Bichan rivers flowing through Achalpur and Paratwada are other affluent streams. It also passes through Pandharpur where the famous temple of Vithobha is situated.
