= Dharni, Amravati =

Human settlement in India

Coordinates: 21°33′N 76°53′E

Dharni (CT) is a Nagar Panchayat and Census Town city in Amravati district in the Indian state of Maharashtra. The Dharni Census Town has population of 15,761 of which 8,075 are males while 7,686 are females as per report released by Census of India 2011. It is the headquarters of Dharni tehsil and forms the terminus of the high road through the hills from Paratwada to Burhanpur. It is 97 km (60 mi) distant from Paratwada and 148 km (92 mi) from Amravati.

The population of children aged 0-6 is 2066 which is 13.11% of total population of Dharni (CT). In Dharni Census Town, the female sex ratio is 952 against state average of 929. Moreover the child sex ratio in Dharni is around 918 compared to Maharashtra state average of 894. The literacy rate of Dharni city is 85.78% higher than the state average of 82.34%. In Dharni, male literacy is around 90.93% while the female literacy rate is 80.39%.

Dharni Census Town has total administration over 3,234 houses to which it supplies basic amenities like water and sewerage. It is also authorize to build roads within Census Town limits and impose taxes on properties coming under its jurisdiction.

Dharni was noted for the malaria-infested areas, but these have since been cleared of malaria and brought under cultivation. The land is very fertile, the chief crops being wheat and gram. For irrigation, the river Tapi has been tapped here. Melghat tehsil is rich in timber forests and hence the State Government have established a timber depot there. Most of the timber after local consumption is chiefly exported to Mumbai. There are the offices of the Sub Divisional Magistrate, Tehsildar, State Electricity Board, Integrated Tribal Development Department, the Panchayat Samiti and the Sub Divisional Police Officer. It has a branch of the District Co-operative Bank and 4 other Cooperative Societies. The village has a primary school, a multipurpose high school, a post-office and a police station. A sub-divisional city hospital is in service which conducted by the Zilla Parisad. Recently a maternity home has been established.

Dharni is now the biggest commercial center in the 100 km radius of Melghat. The growth of Dharni is bound by the proposed Tapi dam. The initial rate of growth was much quicker in the past.

MIDC-Dharni (Melghat) (Group D)

Dharni Industrial Area is one of the mini Industrial areas in the Amravati District. MIDC has developed Dharni mini Industrial area by providing the best infrastructure to attract local entrepreneurs and industrialists.

Particulars Details Total area acquired 10.00 Hectares. Area developed 7.37 Hectares. Available for allotment 19 Nos. (7.37 Hectares).

Land Rates Industrial Plots per square metre : 65 Commercial Plots per square metre : 90

The News: The rich forests of Melghat are home to an impoverished people

Melghat hit the headlines in 1997 for the death of 500 adivasi children due to malnutrition. Children have been dying every year, especially during the rains when the adivasis do not have adequate employment for daily earnings.

Melghat is a vast forested tract spread over two tehsils of Amravati district, Chikhaldara and Dharni. It covers a geographical area of about 4,426 km^{2}. Of this, 3,630 km^{2} is in Chikhaldara. This tehsil retains its dense forest cover because of its comparatively low population—about 76,000 people in 197 villages. The 796 km^{2} of Dharni tehsil have fewer forests due to the pressure of 1.13 lakh people living in 153 villages.

It was earlier estimated that the deaths of adivasi children mostly occurred in Dharni and not in the Melghat Tiger Reserve. The problem has now spread, with deaths in 39 villages of the Multiple Use Area (MUA) of the tiger reserve. The reserve covers 1,676 km^{2} of forests. It includes the Gugamal National Park (361.28 km^{2}), which has no village within its boundaries, the Melghat Wildlife Sanctuary (788.75 km^{2}) with 19 villages and a MUA (526.90 km^{2}) with the 39 villages.

The reserve has a human population of 25,000. Of these, 8,000 people live in 19 villages of the sanctuary and 17,000 adivasis live in the 39 villages of the MUA. Studies have shown that one of the reasons for the rising child deaths among the Korkus of Melghat is that they are denied access to traditional foods like wild flowers, tubers, fruits, crabs and fish from the rich forest.

Dharni is facing challenges from the government's new policy of making dams which poses a great threat to almost 2,000 inhabitants living in surrounding villages.

Dharni is well connected to nearest cities like Akola, Amrawati, Khandwa, Burhanpur by road. MSRTC and MP Parivahan Buses are available for the above cities.
