= Dhulghat Spiral =

The Dhulghat Spiral is a railway spiral located in the Amravati district of the Indian state of Maharashtra. Situated on the Akola–Khandwa metre-gauge section of South Central Railway, it is a unique engineering structure.

Locally referred to as "Char Cha Akda" in Marathi and "Char Ka Aankda" in Hindi—both translating to "digit four"—it is named for its resemblance to the number "4" in the Devanagari script.

== Location ==
The spiral is located between Wan Road and Dhulghat stations on the Akola–Ratlam metre-gauge railway line, approximately 2 km (1.2 mi) from Dhulghat towards Akola. Set within a forested, hilly terrain along the rail route, its coordinates are 21.282°N 76.765°E.

== Structure ==
The spiral consists of a 193 m (633 ft) steel viaduct spanning a shallow valley. Trains approaching from Akola pass over this viaduct, which routes the track in a circular path around a hill. After completing the loop, the track runs parallel to the approach from Akola but at a significantly lower altitude. This lower-level track passes beneath the first of sixteen bridge girders as it continues toward Dhulghat and Khandwa. Trains typically take about four minutes to navigate the spiral.

== Historical and current usage ==
The spiral was formerly part of the metre-gauge line running from Ajmer in Rajasthan to Kacheguda in Andhra Pradesh (now in Telangana) under the South Central Railway zone. Due to gauge conversion projects, the operational route was shortened between Akola in Maharashtra and Fatehabad Chandrawatiganj in Madhya Pradesh. However, the spiral faces potential decommissioning due to ongoing gauge conversion works on the Akola–Ratlam section.

== How to reach ==
The site can be accessed via Akola, situated on the Howrah–Nagpur–Mumbai line, and Khandwa, located on the Mumbai–Delhi main line (via Bhusaval and Itarsi) of Indian Railways.
