= Ellachipur Sanman =

Ellachipur Sanman is a chili pepper variety grown mainly in the Amravati district of Maharashtra state, central India. When this chili is dried, it turns to a dark red color and develops an intense, fiery flavor.
