= Nandgaon Khandeshwar =

Coordinates: 20°41′N 77°50′E

Nandgaon Khandeshwar Nandgaon Khandeshwar
- City
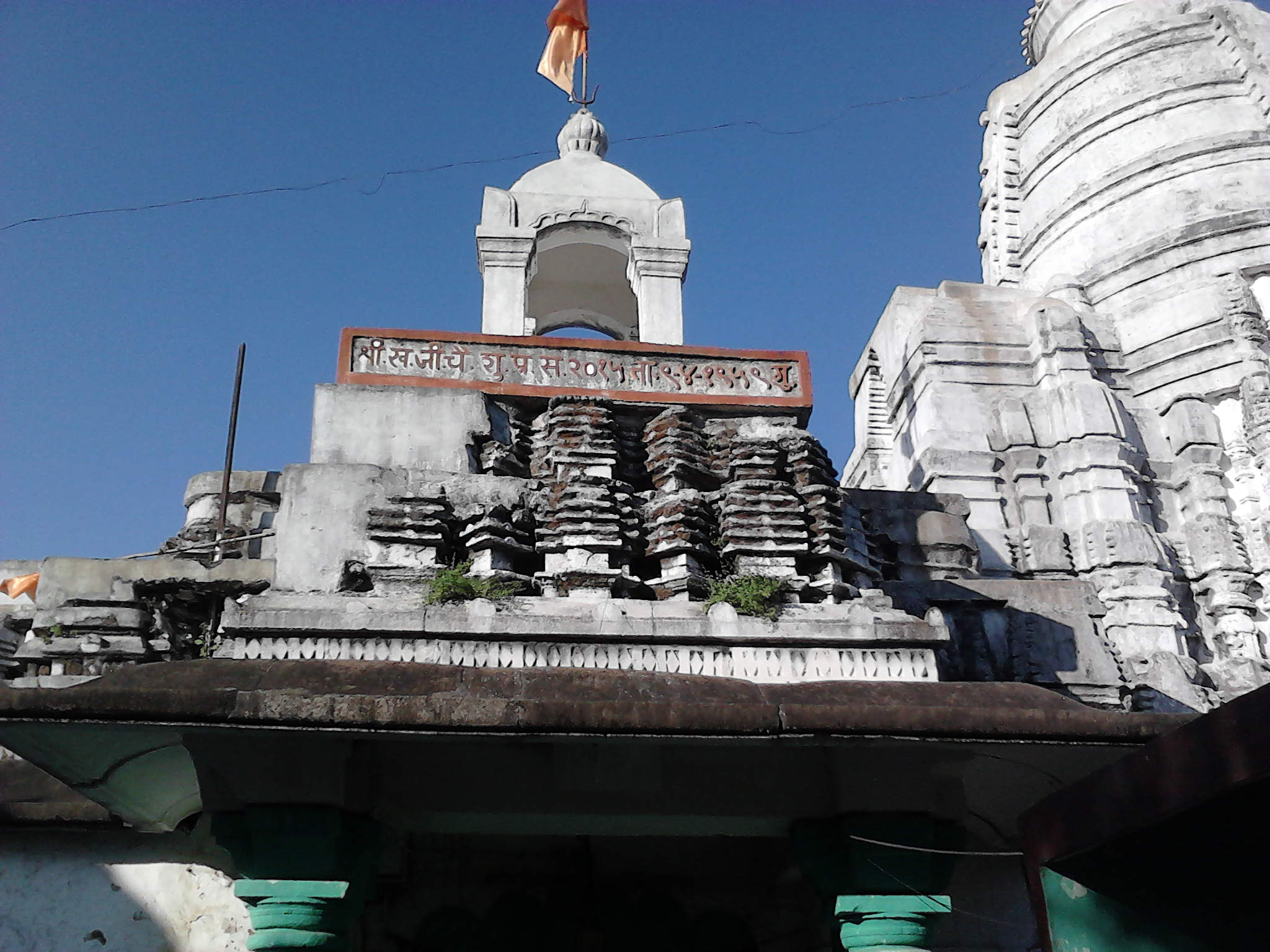
- Khandeshwar Temple
- Interactive map of Nandgaon Khandeshwar
- Country: India
- State: Maharashtra
- District: Amravati

Area
  - Total: 787 km^{2} (304 sq mi)
  - Rank: 1

Population (2011)
  - Total: 129,810
  - Density: 165/km^{2} (427/sq mi)

Languages
  - Official: Marathi
- Time zone: UTC+5:30 (IST)
- PIN: 444708
- Telephone code: 07221
- Vehicle registration: MH-27
- Coastline: 0 kilometres (0 mi)
- Nearest city: Amravati

Nandgaon Khandeshwar is a city and a municipal council in Amravati district in the state of Maharashtra, India. Nandgaon Khandeshwar is one of the three townships (talukas) in Chandur (Railway) subdivision in Amravati district. The other two are Dhamangaon Railway and Chandur Railway. Khandeshwar Temple is the most famous and oldest place in Nandgaon Khandeshwar and was built by Hemadpantis. In Maha Shivaratri, there is a fair at Khandeshwar Temple, which is a big event for the people of Nandgaon Khandeshwar. This event is celebrated for 7 days by all of Nandgaon. This is one of the municipalities (nagar panchayats) of Amravati district. It has good connectivity by road and is near Samruddhi Highway and Navnagar.

== Khandeshwar Temple ==
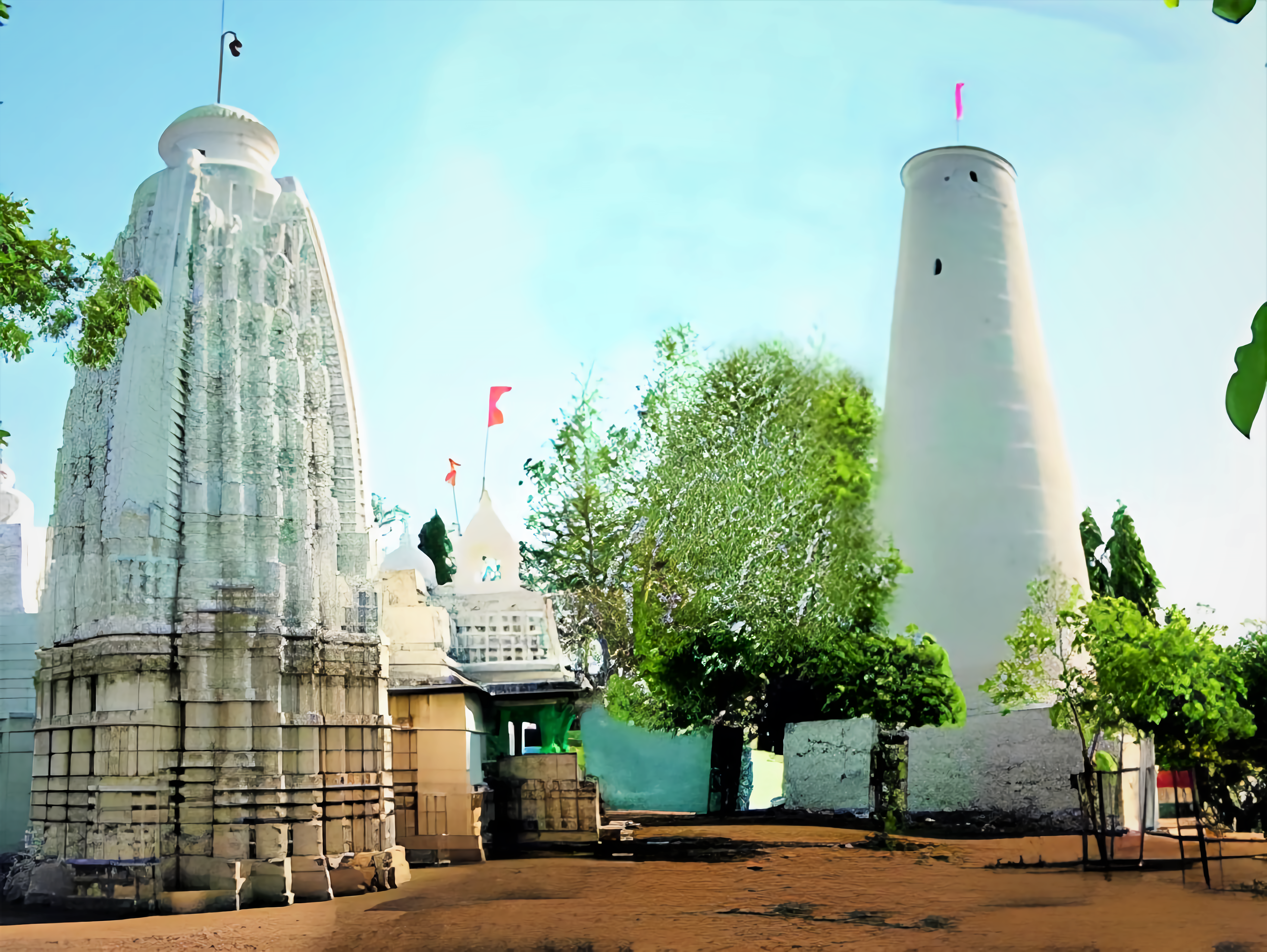
Historic Khandeshwar temple

There is one oldest temple of Khandeshwar Bhagawan built by Hemadpantis.

== Demographics ==
As per Indian government census of 2011, the population was 129,810. Out of these 66661 were males and 63149 were females.

Year	Male	Female	Total Population	Change	Religion (%)							
Year	Male	Female	Total Population	Change	Hindu	Muslim	Christian	Sikhs	Buddhist	Jain	Other religions and persuasions	Religion not stated
2001	64148	60456	124604	-	70.598	8.427	0.193	0.168	19.984	0.469	0.110	0.051
2011	66661	63149	129810	4.178	71.229	8.529	0.142	0.108	19.379	0.392	0.010	0.211

== See also ==
- Khandeshwar
