= Berar Division =

Division of the Central Provinces of British India

Coordinates: 20°55′N 77°45′E

- Division of British India
- 1903–1947
- Flag

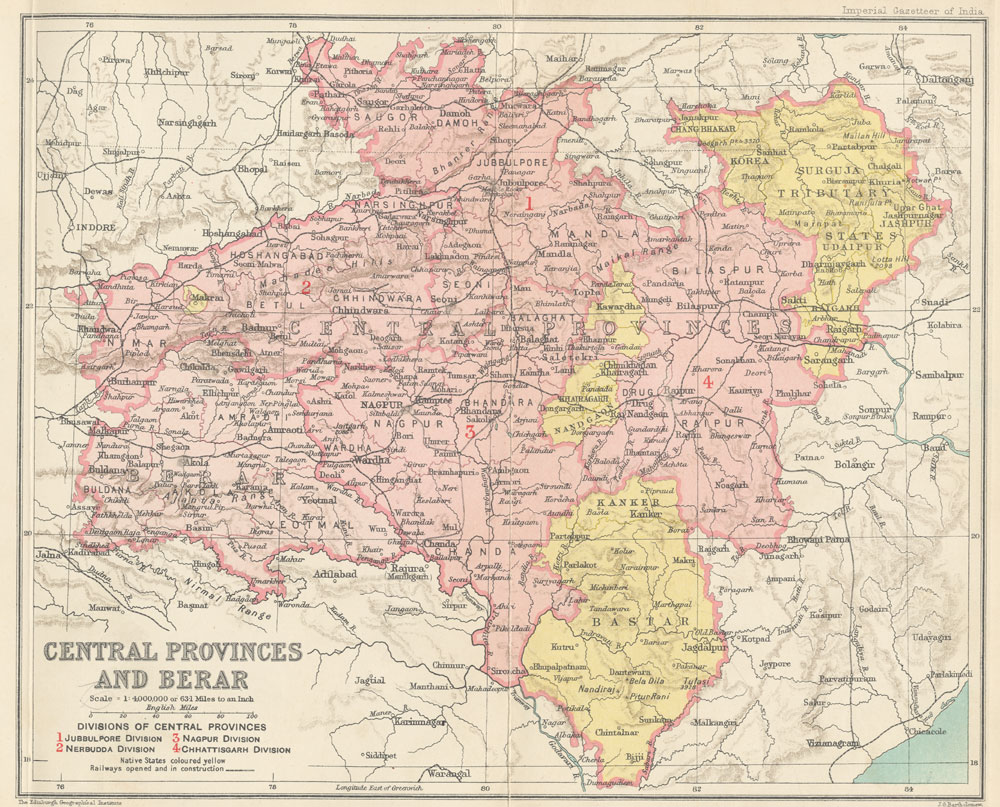
- 1909 map of the Central Provinces with Berar Division in light pink.
- Capital: Ellichpur (Achalpur)
- Area
  - 1881: 28,515 km^{2} (11,010 sq mi)
- Population
  - 1881: 2,672,673
- History
  - Creation of the division: 1903
  - Independence of India: 1947
Preceded by	Succeeded by
Berar Province	Amravati Division
- This article incorporates text from a publication now in the public domain: Chisholm, Hugh, ed. (1911). "Berar". Encyclopædia Britannica (11th ed.). Cambridge University Press.

Hyderabad State (dark green) and Berar (light green), not a part of Hyderabad State but also the Nizam's Dominion between 1853 and 1903.

The Berar Division, formerly Berar Province, was one of the former administrative divisions of the Central Provinces and Berar of British India. Ellichpur (Achalpur) was the capital and the administrative headquarters of the division.

The Berar Division had an area of 28,515 km² with a population of 2,672,673 in 1881. The main mountain chains in the area were the Satpura and the Ajanta ranges, and the main rivers the Tapti, the Purna, the Wardha, the Penganga, and the Pranhita. It was located in present-day Maharashtra state of India.

== History ==
Berar Province, formerly ruled by the Nizam of Hyderabad, was administered by the British after 1853, although the Nizam retained formal sovereignty over the province. Through an agreement signed on 5 November 1902, Nizam Mahboob Ali Khan leased Berar permanently to the British against an annual payment of 25 lakh (2.5 million) rupees. Lord Curzon decided to merge Berar with the Central Provinces, and this was proclaimed on 17 September 1903. Thus the Central Provinces and Berar was born by a Residency Order, dated the 30 September 1903, and the administration of Berar was placed under the Chief Commissioner of the Central Provinces.

After October 1, 1903, the administration of the province was placed under the commissioner-general for the Central Provinces as the 'Berar Division'. On 24 October 1936, with the establishment of the legislative assembly of the 'Central Provinces and Berar' the Central Provinces became 'Central Provinces and Berar' when it was fully merged with Berar, although Berar Division remained under the nominal sovereignty of Hyderabad.

Following the independence of India in 1947, the Central Provinces and Berar became a province of India, and in 1950 became the Indian state of Madhya Pradesh. In 1956, the Indian states were reorganized along linguistic lines, and Berar and Nagpur became part of Bombay State. In 1960, Bombay State was split along linguistic lines, and the southern, Marathi-speaking portion of the state, including Berar Division, became the new state of Maharashtra.

== Territory ==
Berar consisted of one Division with a Commissioner. It was under the administrative authority of the Chief Commissioner for the Central Provinces, but administered separately from the other divisions until 1936.

In 1904, there were twelve municipalities in Berar, including Amravati, Akola, Achalpur, Washim, Yavatmal, Khamgaon, Shegaon, Akot, and four more. After the Independence of India it became the Amravati division of Maharashtra.

=== Districts ===
The Berar Division included the five districts of Achalpur, Wun (Wani), Akola, Buldhana and Washim in 1905. It was later rearranged into the following four districts:

- Amravati district
- Yavatmal district
- Akola district
- Buldhana district

== See also ==
- Central Provinces and Berar
- Berar Province
