= Tiosa =

Tivsa
- Town
- Location in Maharashtra, India
- Coordinates: 21°5′10″N 78°3′50″E
- Country: India
- State: Maharashtra
- District: Amravati

Government
  - Body: municipal council
- Elevation: 306 m (1,004 ft)

Languages
  - Official: Marathi
- Time zone: UTC+5:30 (IST)
- Postal code: 444903
- Vehicle registration: MH 27

Tiosa, or Tivsa, is a town, municipal council, and tehsil in Amravati district in the state of Maharashtra, India.

== Geography ==
Tivsa is located at 21°5′10″N 78°3′50″E. It has an average elevation of 306 metres (1,007 feet).

== Demographics ==
As of 2011 India census, Tiosa had a population of 12,486. Males constitute 52% of the population and females 48%. Tiosa has an average literacy rate of 77%, higher than the national average of 59.5%; with 54% of the males and 46% of females literate. 12% of the population is under 6 years of age.

== Transportation ==
Tivsa is located on Hajira–Kolkata National Highway 6.

== Places of religious interest ==
Warkhed - Birthplace of Sant Adkoji Maharaj. He is guru of RastraSant Tukdoji Maharaj.

Mozari - Workplace of great personality Rastrasant Tukdoji Maharaj.Vandaniya maharaj had given a great donation in INDIAN independence. He founded Vishwa Hindu Parishad, Bharat Sadhu Samaj, Akhil Bharatiya Shri Gurudeo Sevamandal. There is also a lake mostly known as Gurudev Lake and also there is Manavata Mandir.

Shendurjana Bazar - Workplace of Achchut Maharaj. He was the follower of Tukdoji Maharaj.

Kaundinyapur or Kaundanyapur is a village in Tivsa Tehsil in Amravati District in the state of Maharashtra, India, thought to be the site of Kundinapuri, ancient capital of the legendary Vidarbha Kingdom. It is situated on the bank of Wardha River
