= Harihar Vaman Deshpande =

Indian political activist and civil servant (1905-1965)

Harihar Deshpande
- हरिहर वामन देशपांडे
- Born: 5 March 1905; Chendkapur, Bombay Presidency, India
- Died: 20 April 1965 (aged 60); Nagpur, Maharashtra, India
- Occupation: Government Service

Harihar Vaman Deshpande (हरिहर वामन देशपांडे; 5 March 1905 in Amravati—20 April 1965) was an Indian political activist, civil servant, and writer. He was involved in the non-cooperation movement in its early days and later in the Hindu Mahasabha and Quit India Movement. He was a major adherent to Indian physical culture and spent much of his career conducting physical training camps across India.

== Early life and education ==
Deshpande was born in Chandkapur, Amravati. He attended Government Hindu High School in Amravati, where he appeared for his 10th standard in 1921. In 1918, he joined Hanuman Vyayam Prasarak Mandal (HVPM), where he was trained in wrestling and other sports. While at HVPM, he became involved in the social and political ideologies being practiced by Veer Vamanrao Joshi, including Mahatma Gandhi's non-cooperation movement. Deshpande boycotted high school education and, in 1921, began campaigning heavily in rural areas to raise awareness of the non-cooperation movement. He completed his education at the Rashtriya Mahavidyalaya in Amalner in 1922. He then attended Tilak Maharashtra Vidyapeeth in Pune from 1923 to 1925, graduating with a B.A. degree as Wangmaya Visharad. He remained friends with classmates Swami Ramanand Tirth and H.R. Mahajani.

== Career ==
In 1926, he worked as a teacher at Rashtriya Vidyalaya in Akot before returning to HVMP in 1927 to participate in its political activities. He was sent to West Bengal and Uttar Pradesh as a propagandist of physical culture and to conduct physical training camps under the Hindu Mahasabha initiative of Calcutta. While working in Uttar Pradesh, he came in contact with Hindu Mahasabha leaders like Madan Mohan Malaviya and Lal Bahadur Shastri, as well as his former HVPM schoolmate, Shivaram Rajguru, who visited one of the camps in Gorakhpur. In 1929, he attended the All India Session of the Indian National Congress (INC) in Lahore with colleagues T.G. Joshi and Babubhai P. Vaidya.

In 1930, he was elected secretary of the Vidarbha Pradesh Congress Committee and a member of the All India Congress Committee (AICC) and served for four years. He was arrested later that year for his active involvement in the non-cooperation movement and served a year in prison. After his release, he became involved in organizing the All-India Training Camp for the Hindustani Seva Dal in Borivali and the 22 Taluka Congress Committee in Vidarbha, both in 1931. He was arrested again in 1932. In 1933 and 1934, Deshpande was involved in organizing for the Berar Youth League and its conferences. Between 1937 and 1939, he helped organize the Provincial and All India Conferences in support of the Registration Bill of Ayurvedic Practitioners. He organized a 150-member team of HVPM members to participate in the INC's Golden Jubilee at Govalia Tank Maidan in 1937. This group had previously held a display of traditional physical activities for Maharaja Sayajirao Gaikwad and Sardar Vallabha Bhai Patel. In 1939, he recruited and trained 3,000 volunteers from Madhya Pradesh and Mahakoshal for service at the All India Session of the AICC in Jabalpur. Between 1940 and 1942, he was an active participant in the Quit India Movement for which he was again arrested and jailed for more than six months. Around this time, he also served as the Chief Organizer of the Volunteers Corps and as the chief organizer of the Indian Lingiad team.

Deshpande served as the Liaison & Welfare Officer for Madhya Pradesh's Home Guard Department from 1947 to 1956. He served in the same capacity for the Maharashtra Government from 1956 and 1960. He resigned in 1960 and became Managing Editor of Aarogya Mandir, a monthly magazine in Panvel. He also published a magazine in Amravati between 1960 and 1963. After its closure, he worked for the Mahatma Gandhi National Memorial Trust as organizer of the Gandhi Study Centre in Amravati, where he organized lectures on Gandhian ideology and was instrumental in setting up a library (1961–64).

Throughout his career, he volunteered with organizations including National Association of Physical Education & Recreation, Hanuman Vyayam Prasarak Mandal Amravati, Nagpur University Board of Physical Education & Recreation, Maharashtra Sharirik Shikshan Parishad and Maharashtra Ayurved Parishad Pune.

== Personal life and death ==
Deshpande developed health problems towards the end of 1964 and was hospitalized at Govt. Medical College Hospital, where he died on 20 April 1965.

== Bibliography ==
- 1936: Rājput rājyañca uday va rhas (राजपुत राज्यांचा उदय व ऱ्हास)
- 1936: Rājput sanskṛuti (राजपूत संस्कृती)
- Avnatimay Bharatvarsh (अवनतिमय भारतवर्ष)
- Don Prakhyat Yuddhtantre (दोन प्रख्यात युध्द तंन्त्रे)
- 1857 Chya Veer Mahila (१८५७ च्या वीर महिला)
- Shikhancha Shat Sanvatsarik Itihas (शिखांचा शत संवत्सारिक इतिहास)
