= Chandurbazar =

Chandur Bazar
- city
- Nickname: ChBz
- Location in Maharashtra, India
- Coordinates: 21.2417°N 77.7456°E
- Country: India
- State: Maharashtra
- District: Amravati

Population (2011)
  - Total: 18,759

Languages
  - Official: Marathi
- Time zone: UTC+5:30 (IST)
- Postal code: 444704
- Vehicle registration: MH27

Chandur bazar is a City governed by a Municipal Council in Amravati district in the state of Maharashtra, India.

Chandurbazar is situated about 10 kilometres (6.2 mi) from the border of Madhya Pradesh.

== Demographics ==
As of the India census, Chandurbazar had a population of 18759. Males constitute 51% of the population and females 49%. Chandurbazar has an average literacy rate of 79%, higher than the national average of 59.5%; with male literacy of 83% and female literacy of 75%. 13% of the population is under 6 years of age.

Chandurbazar has large organizations like Rashtriya Swayamsevak Sangh, Bharatiya janta party and Akhil Bhartiya Vidhyarthi Parishad Vishwa Hindu Parishad, Bajrang Dal.

Year	Male	Female	Total Population	Change	Religion (%)							
Year	Male	Female	Total Population	Change	Hindu	Muslim	Christian	Sikhs	Buddhist	Jain	Other religions and persuasions	Religion not stated
2001	8985	8650	17635	-	50.536	38.616	0.465	0.028	9.521	0.783	0.006	0.045
2011	9529	9230	18759	0.064	46.426	42.891	0.453	0.064	9.542	0.512	0.053	0.059

== Economy ==
Chandurbazar is a hub for buying and selling cattle in the nearby region. It is also famous for jaggery processed by local farmers. The region also produces oranges and custard apples. It is also famous for saint Gulabrao Maharaj. Well known as Gudaacha Chandur.

== Education ==
There are four senior colleges in Chandurbazar:

- Dr. Panjabrao Deshmukh Yoga Mahavidyalay College

(Near Bhaktidham, Chandur Bazar- Borala Road.)

- N.A. Deshmukh College
- G. S. Tompe Arts, Commerce & Science College
- College of Home Science

The G. S. Tompe Arts, Commerce & Science College was established in 1968 by Govidrao Sitaram Tompe to provide higher education in Chandurbazar.

Schools from the primary to the secondary level of education include:

- Dnyanodaya Vidyamandir Bhaktidham
- Jijamata High School
- G. R. Kabra High School
- Nagar Parishad High School
- Mainabai High School
- Urdu High School
- Orange Line School
- Jagadamb High School
- Anand Primary School
- Maharashtra Primary School

There are several kindergartens in Chandurbazar, including the following:

- Nirmitee Convent
- Sunrise Convent
- Little Angels School
- G. R. Kabra Public Convent
- I-Tech Computer Institute, Shivaji Nagar, Chandur Bazar

== Communication ==
Chandurbazar is linked by road to the city of Amravati, as well as neighboring towns like Morshi, Paratwada (Achalpur) Asegaon, etc. The proposed Nagpur-Indore National Highway will go through the town. Chandurbazar is also connected by rail, with one train station on the Amravati-Narkher line.
