= Wan Wildlife Sanctuary =

Wildlife sanctuary in Amravati district, Maharashtra, India

- Location within Maharashtra Location within India
- Interactive map of Wan Wildlife Sanctuary
- Location: Amravati district, Maharashtra, India
- Nearest city: Chikhaldara
- Coordinates: 21.30°N 77.25°E
- Area: 211.00 km^{2} (81.47 sq mi)
- Designation: Wildlife sanctuary
- Established: 1997
- Governing body: Forest Department, Government of Maharashtra

Wan Wildlife Sanctuary is a wildlife sanctuary in the Amravati district of the Indian state of Maharashtra. It was notified by the Government of Maharashtra in 1997 and covers approximately 211 km^{2} (21,100.70 ha). The sanctuary forms part of the Melghat landscape and is included within the Melghat Tiger Reserve critical tiger habitat; it protects southern tropical dry deciduous forests and several regionally important species.

== History ==
The area comprising the present sanctuary is part of the Melghat forests and was formally notified as Wan Wildlife Sanctuary by the Government of Maharashtra in 1997 (Notification No. WLP/1097/CR-5/F-1). The sanctuary was later identified as part of the critical tiger habitat forming the core of Melghat Tiger Reserve in state and central notifications and included within the reserve's eco-sensitive zone planning.

== Flora and fauna ==
The snctuary is characterised by southern tropical dry deciduous forest, with teak (Tectona grandis) and associated dry-deciduous species dominating much of the canopy. Mammals include tiger (Panthera tigris), leopard (Panthera pardus), gaur (Bos gaurus), and sloth bear (Melursus ursinus). The sanctuary and the broader Melghat area are also noted for regionally important bird species such as the Forest Owlet (Heteroglaux blewitti). Surveys and management documents describing the Melghat Tiger Reserve list Wan as an integral protected area within the reserve's critical tiger habitat.

== Management ==
The sanctuary is administered by the Maharashtra Forest Department and is managed as part of the Melghat Tiger Reserve landscape for wildlife conservation, habitat protection and regulated tourism. Management and planning documents for Melghat treat Wan as one of the constituent sanctuaries within the reserve and address habitat management, anti-poaching measures, and community engagement consistent with state and national guidelines for tiger reserves and wildlife sanctuaries.

== See also ==
- Kanhargaon Wildlife Sanctuary
