= Chandrabhaga Dam (Amravati) =

Dam in Amravati, Maharashtra, India

- Location within Maharashtra
- Official name: Chandrabhaga Dam
- Location: Amravati
- Coordinates: 21°20′30″N 77°23′26″E
- Demolition date: N/A
- Owners: Government of Maharashtra, India

Dam and spillways
- Type of dam: Earthfill
- Impounds: Chandrabhaga river
- Height: 44.7 m (147 ft)
- Length: 1,573 m (5,161 ft)
- Dam volume: 2,952 km^{3} (708 cu mi)

Reservoir
- Total capacity: 41,248 km^{3} (9,896 cu mi)
- Surface area: 3,262 km^{2} (1,259 sq mi)

Chandrabhaga Dam, is an earthfill dam on Chandrabhaga river near Amravati in state of Maharashtra in India.

== Specifications ==
The height of the dam above lowest foundation is 44.7 m (147 ft) while the length is 1,573 m (5,161 ft). The volume content is 2,952 km^{3} (708 cu mi) and gross storage capacity is 41,427.00 km^{3} (9,938.87 cu mi).

== Purpose ==
- Irrigation
- Hydroelectricity
- Water supply

== See also ==
- Dams in Maharashtra
- List of reservoirs and dams in India
