= Paratwada =

Paratwada Achalpur Camp and Achalpur & Paratwada — Twin City
- City
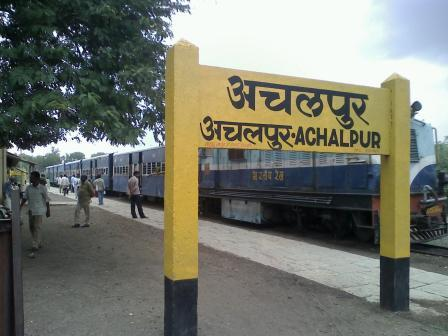
- Narrow gauge train named 'Shakuntala' at Achalpur Railway Station
- Nickname: City of Dams
- Location in Maharashtra, India
- Coordinates: 21°17′49″N 77°31′10″E
- Country: India
- State: Maharashtra
- Region: Vidarbha
- District: Amravati

Government
  - Type: Public
  - Body: Achalpur Municipal Council

Area
  - Total: 35 km^{2} (14 sq mi)
- Elevation: 369 m (1,211 ft)

Population (2011)
  - Total: 112,311
  - Density: 3,200/km^{2} (8,300/sq mi)

Languages
  - Official: Marathi
- Time zone: UTC+5:30 (IST)
- PIN: 444805 and 444806
- Telephone code: 07223
- Vehicle registration: MH 27
- Website: https://achalpurparatwada.com/

Paratwada, formerly known as Paltanwada and also known as "Achalpur Camp" is a city and a municipal council in Amravati District in the Indian state of Maharashtra. It is also the second most populous city in Amravati District after Amravati and seventh most populous city in Vidarbha. It has a twin city known as Achalpur. Paratwada is a gateway to the Melghat region which has one of the biggest Tiger conservation projects in India.

== Features ==
Paratwada is well known for its Main Market Places like Sadar Bazar, Gujri Bazar, Cotton Market, etc. City is also known for its street food areas like Bombay Chowpati, and many more. It has a temple named Wagha Mata Temple, which also has a garden. New retailers in Paratwada are coming up with new minimarket ideas like Mart, Bazar, Super-shop, etc. Paratwada has many emerging shops hospital malls. Apart from that, Paratwada City has a large number of hotels, schools, tuition classes, and theatres.

== History ==
Paratwada, Achalpur or Ellichpur is first mentioned in the 13th century as one of the cities of the Deccan Plateau. Though tributary to the Muslim Delhi Sultanate after 1294, it remained under Hindu administration till 1318, when it came directly under the Muslim Delhi Sultanate.

In 1294, Alauddin Khilji, nephew of Jalaluddin Khilji, the reigning emperor of Delhi, invaded the Deccan with the object of subjugating Devagiri, of the wealth of which kingdom he had heard in the course of his forays in Central Asia. He halted and set up his military camps at Ellichpur for and from then marched towards Devagiri from where he carried off an enormous quantity of plunder.

In 1347 Paratwada with the Berar region was ruled by the Bahmani Sultanate.

In 1490 Fathullah Imad-ul-Mulk proclaimed his independence and founded the Imad Shahi dynasty of the Berar Sultanate. He proceeded to annex Mahur to his new kingdom and established his capital at Ellichpur. It was afterwards capital of the Berar Subah at intervals until the Mughal occupation, when the seat of the provincial governor was moved to Balapur. The town retains many relics of the Sultans of Berar.

In 1642 Shah Beg Khan, a commander of 4,000 horse, was appointed subhedar of Berar in place of the Khan-i-Dauran and two years later Allah Vardi Khan was made a commander of 5,000 horse and received Ellichpur in jahagir on the death of Sipahdar Khan. Early in 1658 Aurangzeb left the Deccan in order to participate in the contest for the imperial throne which ensued on the failure of Shah Jahan's health and having worsted his competitors he gained the prize. He appointed Raja Jai Singh to the viceroyalty of the Deccan and made Irij Khan subhedar of Berar. In 1661, Diler Khan accompanied by Irij Khan, the subhedar of Berar and the Faujdar of the province marched through Berar to attack the Gond Raja of Chanda. The Raja submitted and the expedition terminated on the Raja paying to the imperial exchequer a crore of rupees and promising to pay an annual tribute of 2 lakhs and to raze his fortifications. At this time a new power was gaining ascendency in the Deccan, viz., that of the Marathas under the leadership of Chhatrapati Shivaji Maharaj. Inspired by the ideal of carving a separate State, and backed by the zeal of his followers he had made deep incisions in the Adil Shahi kingdom of Bijapur and had carried out daring attacks against the Mughal possessions in the Deccan. Aurangzeb had sensed this danger and had sent his generals, Shayasta Khan, Mirza Raja Jai Singh and Diler Khan to contain Shivaji's activities in 1665. In 1775 Nizam Ali, taking advantage of the existence of strong party opposed to Mudhoji Bhosle in Nagpur, sent Ibrahim Beg against him, and himself advanced as far as Ellichpur.

As the Mughal empire deteriorated in the 18th century, Paratwada along with the rest of Berar came under the rule of the Nizam of Hyderabad. In 1853, Berar Province came under British administration, although it remained formally part of the Hyderabad state until 1903 when the province became the Berar Division of the Central Provinces. Paratwada, known by the British as Achalpur Camp, became part of East Berar, with Amravati as capital of the division. In 1867 East Berar was split into the districts of Amravati and Ellichpur district, with Achalpur Camp as the headquarters of Ellichpur District. The district had an area of 2,605 square miles (6,750 km^{2}).

Initially, Paratwada was mainly formed of six areas, namely, Pensionpura, Gatarmalpura, Bada Bazar, Chota Bazar, Vakil Line & Civil Line. In 1901 Paratwada had a population of 29,740, with ginning factories and a considerable trade in cotton and forest produce. It was connected by good roads with Amravati and Chikhaldara. Berar was annexed to British India in 1903 and merged with the Central Provinces, and in 1905 Ellichpur District was merged into Amravati District. The civil station of Paratwada, 5 km. from the town of Ellichpur, contained the principal public buildings at the beginning of the 20th century.

After India's independence in 1947, the Central Provinces became the province, and after 1950 the state, Madhya Pradesh. The 1956 States Reorganisation Act redrew the boundaries of India's states along linguistic lines, and the predominantly Marathi-speaking Amravati District was transferred to Bombay State, which was renamed Maharashtra in 1960 when it was split from Gujarat.

== Geography ==
Achalpur and Paratwada are twin cities located in the lap of Satpuda . It has an average elevation of 369 metres (1210 ft). These twin cities are surrounded by rivers named Sapan and Bicchhan, the tributaries of Chandrabhaga river. There is a hilly area that acts like a fence to this city. This city is at the boundary of Maharashtra and Madhya Pradesh. Even Madhya Pradesh is so close to this city that travelling of (about) 12 km changes the state region. Paratwada is very famous for its wood and honey exports, largest in Asia, because it is a gateway to one of the densest forests in India – Melghat.

== Demographics ==
As of census 2011 Achalpur and Paratwada Tehsil had a population of 6,12,293. As of 2001 India census, Achalpur & Paratwada had a population of 107,304. Males constitute 52% of the population and females 48%. Achalpur has an average literacy rate of 88%, higher than the national average of 59.5%; with 54% of the males and 46% of females literate. 12% of the population is under 6 years of age.

== Transport ==
Achalpur railway station is the northern terminus of the 762 mm narrow gauge railway known locally as the Shakuntala railway. This line is composed of two legs intersecting with the Mumbai–Kolkata broad gauge railway at Murtizapur Junction railway station — the 76 km northern leg to Paratwada and the 113 km southeastern leg to Yavatmal. As of 2004 this line was still owned by a London-based company which had leased the line to India's Central Railway since 1903.

Paratwada is well connected to major cities by state highways. Maharashtra Major State Highway 6 and Major State Highway 24 passes from Paratwada. Both public and private transport are popular in Paratwada. Private companies too run buses to major cities throughout India. Auto rickshaws and cycle rickshaws are allowed to operate in this city. Also the Maharashtra State Road Transport Corporation (MSRTC) provides transport services to this city for interstate travel. Paratwada has the largest Bus Depot in Vidarbha.

== See also ==
- Ellichpur District
