= Achalpur =

- City
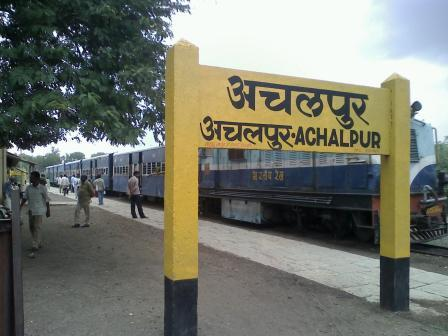
- Narrow gauge train named 'Shakuntala' at Achalpur Railway Station
- Nickname: City of Dams
- Location in Maharashtra, India
- Coordinates: 21°15′26″N 77°30′31″E
- Country: India
- State: Maharashtra
- Region: Vidarbha
- District: Amravati

Area
  - Total: 35 km^{2} (14 sq mi)
- Elevation: 369 m (1,211 ft)

Population (2011)
  - Total: 112,293
  - Density: 3,200/km^{2} (8,300/sq mi)

Languages
  - Official: Marathi
- Time zone: UTC+5:30 (IST)
- PIN: 444805 or 444806
- Telephone code: 07223
- Vehicle registration: MH 27
- Website: https://achalpurparatwada.com/

Achalpur (Marathi pronunciation: [ətsəlpur]), formerly known as Ellichpur and Illychpur, is a city and a municipal council in Amravati District in the Indian state of Maharashtra. It is the second most populous city in Amravati District after Amravati and seventh most populous city in Vidarbha. Achalpur camp is known as Paratwada.

== History ==
According to the ancient Prakrit text Vasudeva-hindi, Achalpur and Vatsagulma (modern Washim) were the chief cities of the Abhira kingdom, reflecting Abhira rule over the Vidarbha region.

Achalpur was the earliest capital of a branch of the Rashtrakuta dynasty, which emerged sometime in the 8th century. It was the site of a battle between the Rashtrakutas and the Kalachuris in the 9th century.

Achalpur or Ellichpur was first mentioned authentically in the 13th century as one of the famous cities of the Deccan. Though tributary to the Delhi Sultanate after 1294, it remained under Hindu administration till 1318 when it came directly under the Muslim Delhi Sultanate.

In 1347 Achalpur with the Berar region was ruled by the Bahmani Sultanate.

In 1490 Fathullah Imad-ul-Mulk proclaimed his independence and founded the Imad Shahi dynasty of the Berar Sultanate. He proceeded to annex Mahur to his new kingdom and established his capital at Ellichpur. It was afterwards the capital of the Berar Subah at intervals until the Mughal occupation when the seat of the provincial governor was moved to Balapur. The town retains many relics of the Sultans of Berar.

As the Mughal empire deteriorated in the 18th century, Achalpur along with the rest of Berar came under the rule of the Nizam of Hyderabad. In 1853, Berar Province came under British administration, although it remained formally part of the Hyderabad state until 1903 when the province became the Berar Division of the Central Provinces. Achalpur, known by the British as Ellichpur, became part of East Berar, with Amravati as the capital of the division. In 1867 East Berar was split into the districts of Amravati and Ellichpur district, with Ellichpur as the headquarters of Ellichpur District. The district had an area of 2,605 square miles (6,750 km^{2}).

In 1901 Achalpur had a population of 29,740, with ginning factories and a considerable trade in cotton and forest produce. It was connected by good roads with Amravati and Chikhaldara. Berar was annexed to British India in 1903 and merged with the Central Provinces, and in 1905 Ellichpur District was merged into Amravati district. The civil station of Paratwada, 5 km from the town of Ellichpur, contained the principal public buildings at the beginning of the 20th century.

After India's independence in 1947, the Central Provinces became the province, and after 1950 the state, Madhya Pradesh. The 1956 States Reorganisation Act redrew the boundaries of India's states along linguistic lines, and the predominantly Marathi-speaking Amravati District was transferred to Bombay State, which was renamed Maharashtra in 1960.

== Geography ==
Achalpur and Paratwada are twin cities located in the lap of Satpuda . It has an average elevation of 369 metres (1210 ft). These twin cities are surrounded by rivers named Sapan and Bicchhan, the tributaries of the Chandrabhaga river.

== Demographics ==
As of census 2011, Achalpur Tehsil had a population of 1,12,311. As of 2001 India census, Achalpur & Paratwada had a population of 107,304. Males constitute 52% of the population and females 48%. Achalpur has an average literacy rate of 88%, higher than the national average of 59.59%; with 54.41% of the males and 46% of females literate. 12% of the population is under 6 years of age.

Year	Male	Female	Total Population	Change	Religion (%)							
Year	Male	Female	Total Population	Change	Hindu	Muslim	Christian	Sikhs	Buddhist	Jain	Other religions and persuasions	Religion not stated
2001	55687	51629	107316	-	58.086	36.177	0.364	0.094	4.453	0.667	0.069	0.089
2011	58108	54203	112311	0.047	54.549	39.505	0.359	0.066	4.864	0.527	0.012	0.117

View source data.
View source data.

== Transportation ==
Achalpur railway station is the northern terminus of the 762 mm narrow gauge railway known locally as the Shakuntala railway. This line is composed of two legs intersecting with the Mumbai–Kolkata standard gauge railway at Murtajapur — the 76 km northern leg to Achalpur and the 113 km southeastern leg to Yavatmal. As of 2004, this line was still owned by a London-based company which had leased the line to India's Central Railway since 1903.

Paratwada is well connected to major cities by state highways. Maharashtra Major State Highway 6 and Major State Highway 24 passes from Paratwada. Both public and private transport are popular in Paratwada. Private companies too run buses to major cities throughout India. Auto rickshaws and cycle rickshaws are allowed to operate in this city. Also, The Maharashtra State Road Transport Corporation (MSRTC) provides transport services to this city for interstate travel.

== See also ==
- Ellichpur District
- Paratwada
