= Upper Wardha Dam =

Dam in Maharashtra, India

Upper Wardha Dam Nal Damayanti Sagar
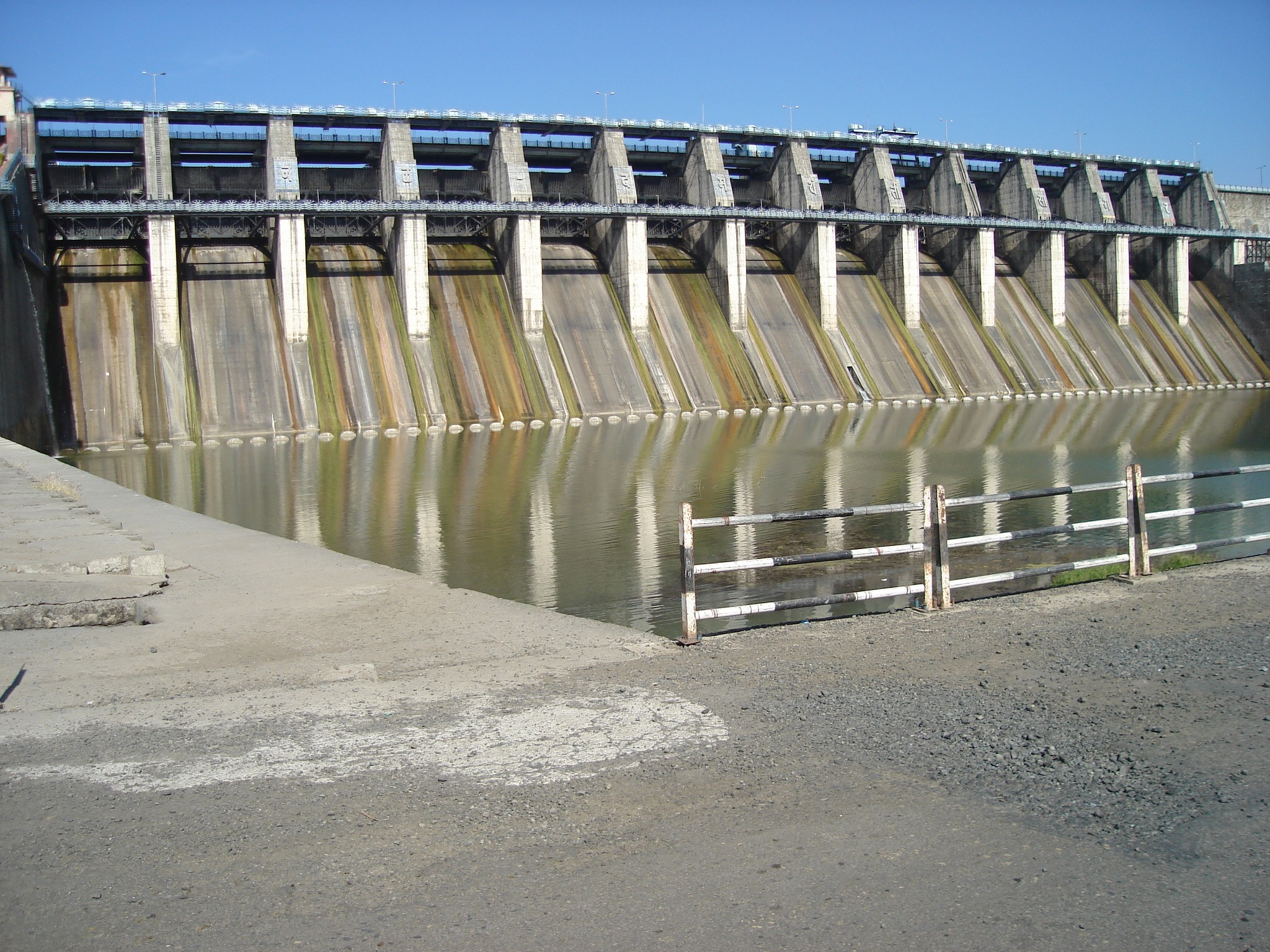

- Location within Maharashtra
- Official name: Upper Wardha Dam D02982
- Location: Morshi
- Coordinates: 21°16′35″N 78°03′26″E
- Opening date: 1993
- Owners: Government of Maharashtra, India

Dam and spillways
- Type of dam: Earthfill; Gravity
- Impounds: Wardha River
- Height: 46.2 m (152 ft) (Spillway), 36.62 m (120.1 ft) Earth Dam
- Length: 5,920 m (19,420 ft) (Spillway 268 m (879 ft))

Reservoir
- Total capacity: 786,480,000 cubic metres (live storage 614,790,000 cubic metres)
- Catchment area: 4,302 km^{2} (1,661 sq mi)
- Surface area: 9,748 ha (24,090 acres)
- Website; Upper Wardha Dam

The Upper Wardha Dam is an earthfill straight gravity dam across the Wardha River, a tributary of the Godavari River, near Simbhora village in Morshi taluk in Amravati district in the Indian state of Maharashtra. The dam provides multipurpose benefits of irrigation, drinking water supply, flood control and hydropower generation.

The Upper Wardha Dam is also known as the Nala Damayanti Sagar, named after the famous characters Nala and Damayanti of an epic love story in Hindu mythology, Nala and Damayanti.

The multipurpose Upper Wardha Dam project is considered the lifeline for Amravati city, and Morshi and Warud Talukas. It is an integral component of the Upper Wardha Irrigation Project, which envisages providing water for irrigation, drinking water supply and for industrial use and also flood control. Hydropower generation is planned only when irrigation develops.

== Geography ==
The Wardha River, across which the Upper Wardha Dam is built, is a tributary of the Godavari River. From its origin, at an altitude of 785 m (2,575 ft) in Satpura Range from the Multai plateau in Betul District of Madhya Pradesh, the river flows 32 km (20 mi) in Madhya Pradesh and then enters into Maharashtra near the Multai plateau of the Satpuda range. It flows along the entire northern and western border of the Wardha district. After traversing 528 km (328 mi), it joins Wainganga River and together it is called the Pranhita, which ultimately flows into the Godavari River. Kar, Wena, Jam and Erai are its left-bank tributaries whereas Madu, Bembla and Penganga are the right-bank tributaries. The catchment area is hilly and forested in its upper reaches from its source and the lower reaches are flat wide valleys.

The project is located near Morshi, about 8 km (5.0 mi) towards to the east of Morshi and 56 km (35 mi) from the Amravati City, in the Godavari River Basin. The river drains a catchment area of 4,302 km^{2} (1,661 sq mi) up to the dam site.

== Hydrology ==
The path of Monsoon depressions that originate in the Bay of Bengal descends directly on the Upper Wardha catchment area. In the months of August and September, intense cyclonic precipitation also occurs over the catchment for one of two days as the low-pressure area formed in the Bay of Bengal and the cyclone moved in North West direction. On such occasions, intense rainfall is followed by flash flood runoff in the catchment. In view of these meteorological aspects heavy floods have been very common feature in this catchment. For such a flashy type of catchment with varying topography, runoff estimates at dam site are an involved process. The catchment drained at the dam site is of 4,302 km^{2} (1,661 sq mi) and is fan shaped. The parameters of slope, soil and vegetation cover, which influence the hydrology of the project, vary widely. The average annual rainfall in the catchment is 840 mm (33 in), with 95% of occurring during monsoon period from June to September. The average annual inflow to the Upper Wardha Reservoir is estimated at 783 million cubic metres. The 75% dependable runoff is estimated as 500,720,000 cubic metres.

== Specifications ==
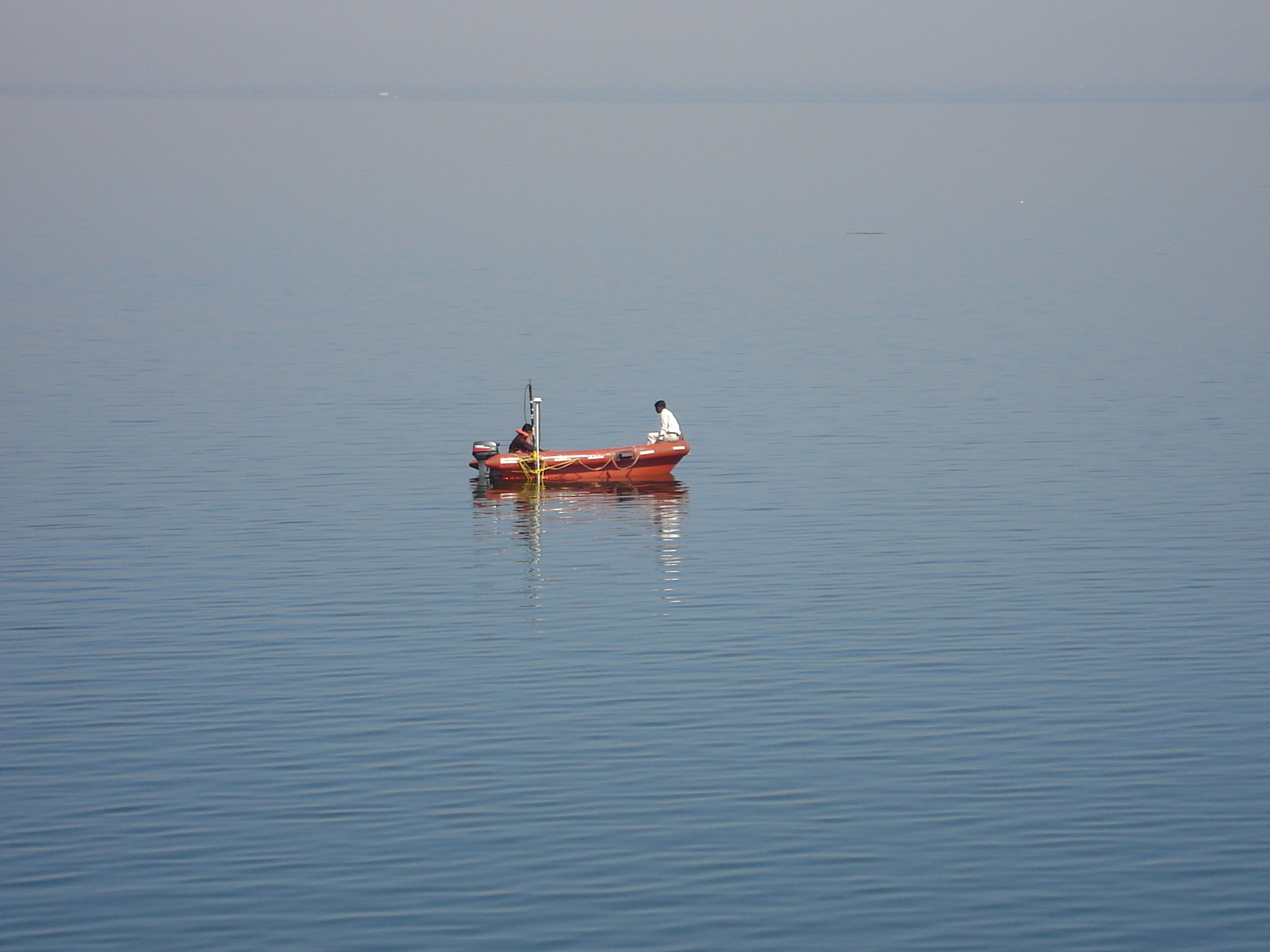
Upper Wardha reservoir

Upper Wardha dam has two sections, the spillway at the central part of the river is flanked by long earthen embankment dams. The height of the masonry dam, which is the spillway, above the lowest foundation is 46.2 m (152 ft) and its length is 268 m (879 ft). The height of the earth dam on both flanks of the spillway is 36.62 m (120.1 ft) and its total length is 5,920 m (19,420 ft). The dam structure has a volume content of 6500 million cubic metres. The gross storage capacity of the reservoir is 786,480,000 cubic metres (27.8 TMC) with the live or effective storage capacity fixed at 614.79 million cubic metres (21.7TMC). The Dead Storage capacity is 171,690,000 cubic metres. Water utilization is planned at 390 million cubic metres. The spillway built in the gorge section of the river, which is 240.5 m (789 ft) long, is a gated structure with 13 radial gates designed to pass the design flood discharge of 19,457 m^{3}/s (687,100 cu ft/s).

Submergence

The reservoir water spread at Full Reservoir Level (FRL) of 342.50 m (1,123.7 ft) is 9,748 ha (24,090 acres). The reservoir submergence involved 24 villages in Amravati and Wardha Districts, which were partially or fully submerged involving rehabilitation of 3000 families (11,817 people) of farmers and fish workers who were displaced and resettled. These families were still in an agitation mode seeking better compensation, as only a small cash compensation was provided to them when resettled. Their demand centred on right to access the Upper Wardha dam (the Nal Damayanti Sagar) reservoir for fisheries as a measure of rehabilitation.

Irrigation benefits

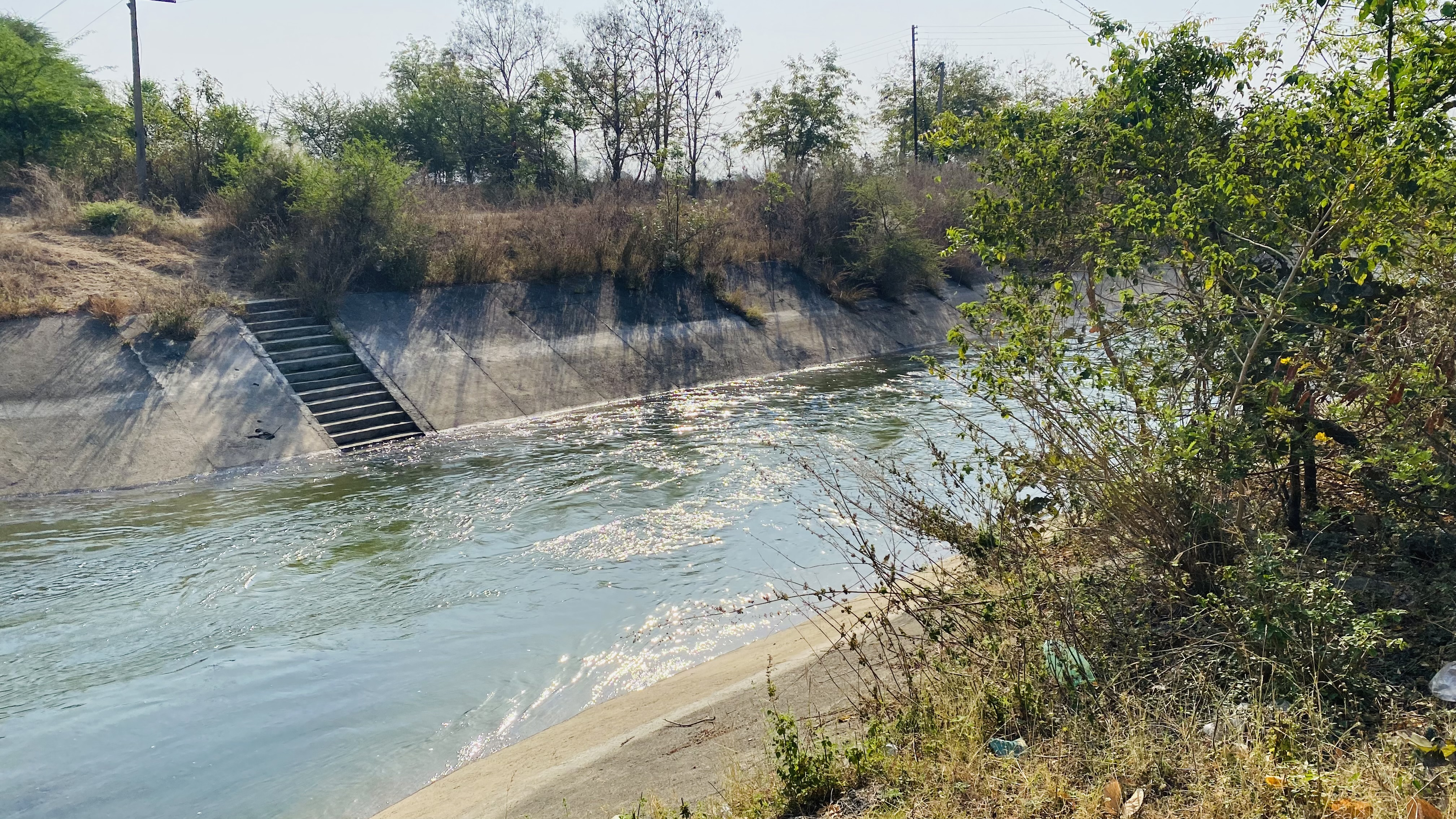
Canal from Upper Wardha Dam near Teosa

The irrigation system of the project was planned to irrigate lands through the right bank main canal of 95 km (59 mi) length and left bank main canal of 42.4 km (26.3 mi) with complement of a system to carry the water to the fields. The total irrigation potential created is in an irrigable area of 70,169 ha (173,390 acres), out of an irrigation potential of 75,080 ha (185,500 acres) (Gross Command Area is 116,970 ha (289,000 acres), Culturable Command Area is 93,603 ha (231,300 acres)), which is spread over the districts of Amravati and Wardha. The command area is principally made up of Black Cotton Soils. Jowar, cotton, soybean, tur, ground nut, and oranges are the major crops grown in the command area. The canal systems are slated for completion by June 2013. To ensure better irrigation planning to ensure supplies reach the tail end of the canal system even during the low flow years, a "General Algorithm" model to operate the reservoir with a Rule Curve (reservoir operating rules) in real time with inputs of all variable parameters (such as monthly demands for irrigation) has been developed. The model results indicate that irrigation releases matched irrigation demand. The reservoir operation in this process is aimed by maintaining minimum storage at the beginning of monsoon (which is the end of water year) and maintaining maximum storage during the peak of the monsoon period. However, due to the heavy sediment inflow the reservoir is losing its active storage capacity.

Water supply

Amravati town is now provided water supply from the Upeer Wardha reservoir supplementing an earlier supply source.. Water supply to the Warud town (a flourishing commercial town about 85 mi (137 km) from Amravati city) is also planned to be supplemented from the Upper Wardha reservoir storage, which will supplement the existing tube well sources and the interim measure of tapping the Shekhdari River as a source. The plan envisages supplementation from the storage at the dam to meet the needs of the projected population of 34,500 in 2011 and 34500 in 2026 at 4,209,000 litres per day and 4,974,000 litres per day, respectively. Water for industrial use has also been allocated and based on this allotment, a 25,000,000 litre per day water treatment plant has been built near Amravati town. Another project to divert 4,230,000 cubic metres of water from the Upper Wardha Dam Pandhurna district in Madhya Pradesh has also been approved at a cost of US$18 million.

Flood control

The reservoir water level is regulated in such a way that the river flooding in the districts of Amravati and Wardha is avoided. An automatic system of operating gates of the spillway dam to release flood water safely downstream has been installed in a control chamber of the dam. The digital instrument installed (based on Genetic Algorithm) is a two-part ultrasonic gauging device. This system is linked to the management system through "RS-232 digital connection" to receive continuous gauge measurement data and concurrently converting the gauge level to volume figures.

Other benefits

The dam and its surroundings provide are picturesque. Several rare species of birds have been reported from the area.

== See also ==
- Dams in Maharashtra
- List of reservoirs and dams in India
