= Morshi =

Morshi Morshi
- city
- Location in Maharashtra, India
- Coordinates: 21.3180°N 78.0095°E
- Country: India
- State: Maharashtra
- District: Amravati

Government
  - Type: Municipal Council
  - Body: Municipal council
  - Member of Legislative Assembly: Devendra Mahadevrao Bhuyar (Swabhimani Paksha)

Area
  - Total: 25.2 km^{2} (9.7 sq mi)

Population (2011)
  - Total: 37,333
  - Rank: 2nd in Amt Dist after Warud
  - Density: 1,480/km^{2} (3,840/sq mi)

Languages
  - Official: Marathi
- Time zone: UTC+5:30 (IST)
- PIN: 444905
- Vehicle registration: MH27

Morshi is the second largest town in the Amravati district of Maharashtra, India. It is located 55 km north-east of Amravati, situated very close to the border with Madhya Pradesh, in the scenic southern foothills of the Satpura ranges. Morshi and the surrounding region is also known for the cultivation of Nagpur oranges and the prominent Nal Damayanti Dam. Salbardi is very near from morshi.

== Administration ==
Morshi is an important sub-district (Tehsil) in Amravati district. Morshi town is a sub-district headquarters. Sub-district administration is run by a sub-divisional officer from IAS. The revenue administration is run by Tehsildar. Other important government establishment in Morshi are the civil and criminal courts and police station.

Local administration is run by a Morshi Nagar Parishad, a city council.

== Demographics ==
As per the 2011 Indian census, Morshi had a population of 37,333, of which 19031 were males and 18302 were females. 8,996 were children ages 0–6, which was 10.19% of the total population.

In Morshi, the female sex ratio is 966 against the state average of 929. Moreover, child sex ratio is around 1000 compared to the Maharashtra state average of 894. Out of the total population of Morshi, Schedule Cast (SC) constitutes 9.67% while Schedule Tribe (ST) were 5.24%. The literacy rate of Morshi city is 90.60%, higher than the state average of 82.34%. Male literacy is around 93.46% while female literacy rate is 87.61%.

Morshi municipal council has total administration over 8,268 houses to which it supplies basic amenities like water and sewage. It is also authorised to build roads within municipal council limits and impose taxes on properties coming under its jurisdiction.

Year	Male	Female	Total Population	Change	Religion (%)							
Year	Male	Female	Total Population	Change	Hindu	Muslim	Christian	Sikhs	Buddhist	Jain	Other religions and persuasions	Religion not stated
2001	17,233	16,374	33,607	-	72.643	20.177	0.205	0.021	5.954	0.446	0.527	0.027
2011	19,031	18,302	37,333	0.111	71.060	21.308	0.214	0.078	6.244	0.335	0.640	0.121

== Transportation ==
There is a Morshi MSRTC Depot of Maharashtra State Transport (S.T. Bus) in Morshi city. It has better connectivity with neighbouring towns and districts Amaravati, Akola, Nagpur, Yavatmal, Buldhana, Wardha and Pune, Aurangabad. Buses for neighbouring state Madhya Pradesh, in Districts like Betul, Chhindwara, Burhanpur, Bhopal are also available.

== Places of attraction ==
- Upper Wardha Dam constructed on the River Wardha.
- Nisarg Paryatan Kendra, Morshi.
- Salbardi: Shiva {chota mahadev} temple located in Satpura mountains about 8.50 kilometer away from Morshi bus station.
- Pinglai Devi Temple: Pinglai Devi Temple located Near Ner Pinglai Village of Tahsil
- Bhorkup: Amba devi temple located in Satpura mountains (Dharul)
- Ridhapur: Mahanubhav Panth God. Also named Mahanubhav Panth Kashi
- Kalankeshvar : Mahanubhav Panth God.Placed at Nerpingalai Village
