= Nagpur orange =

Variety of edible fruit

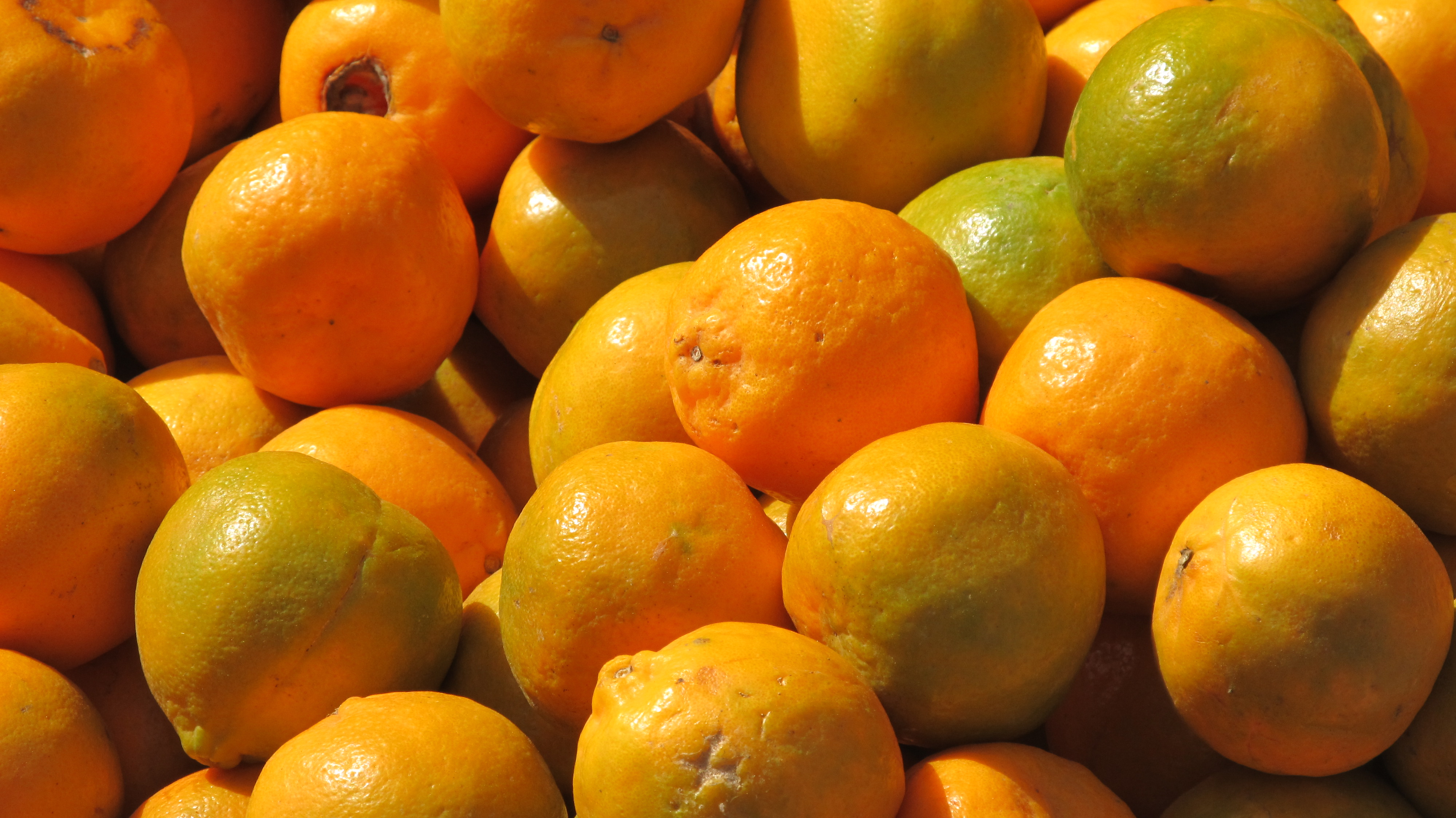
Nagpur oranges

Nagpur orange is a variety of mandarin orange (Citrus reticulata) grown in Nagpur, Maharashtra, India.

== Details ==
The fruit has a pockmarked exterior and sweet and juicy pulp. The Geographical Indication was applied for Nagpur orange with the registrar of GIs in India, and is effective as of April 2014.

Nagpur oranges blossom during the monsoon season and are ready to be harvested. The orange crop grows twice a year. The fruit available from September to December is Ambiya which has a slightly sour taste. It is followed by the sweeter Mrig crop in January. Normally, farmers go for either of the two varieties.
