= Amravati district =

District of Maharashtra, India

- District
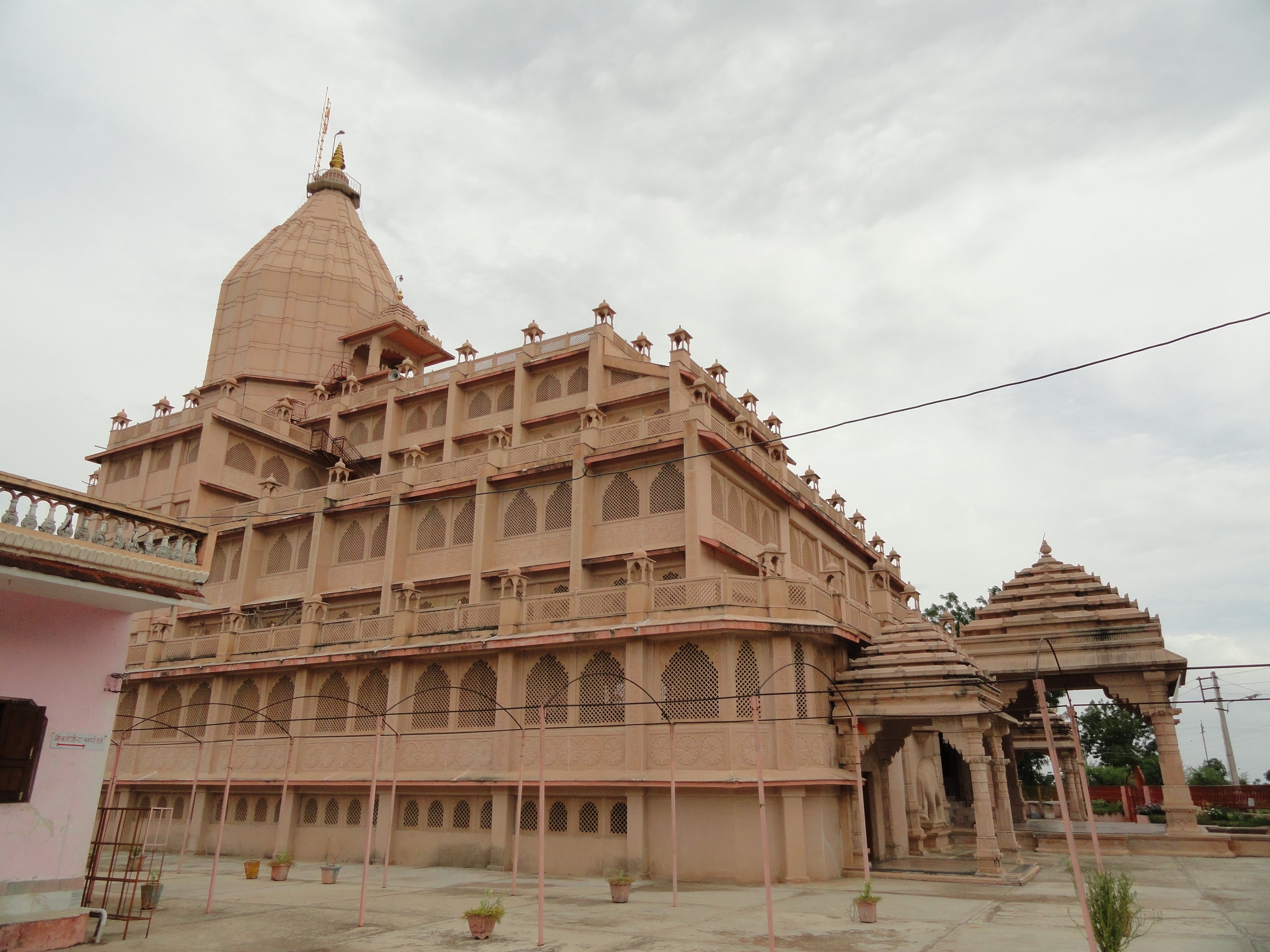
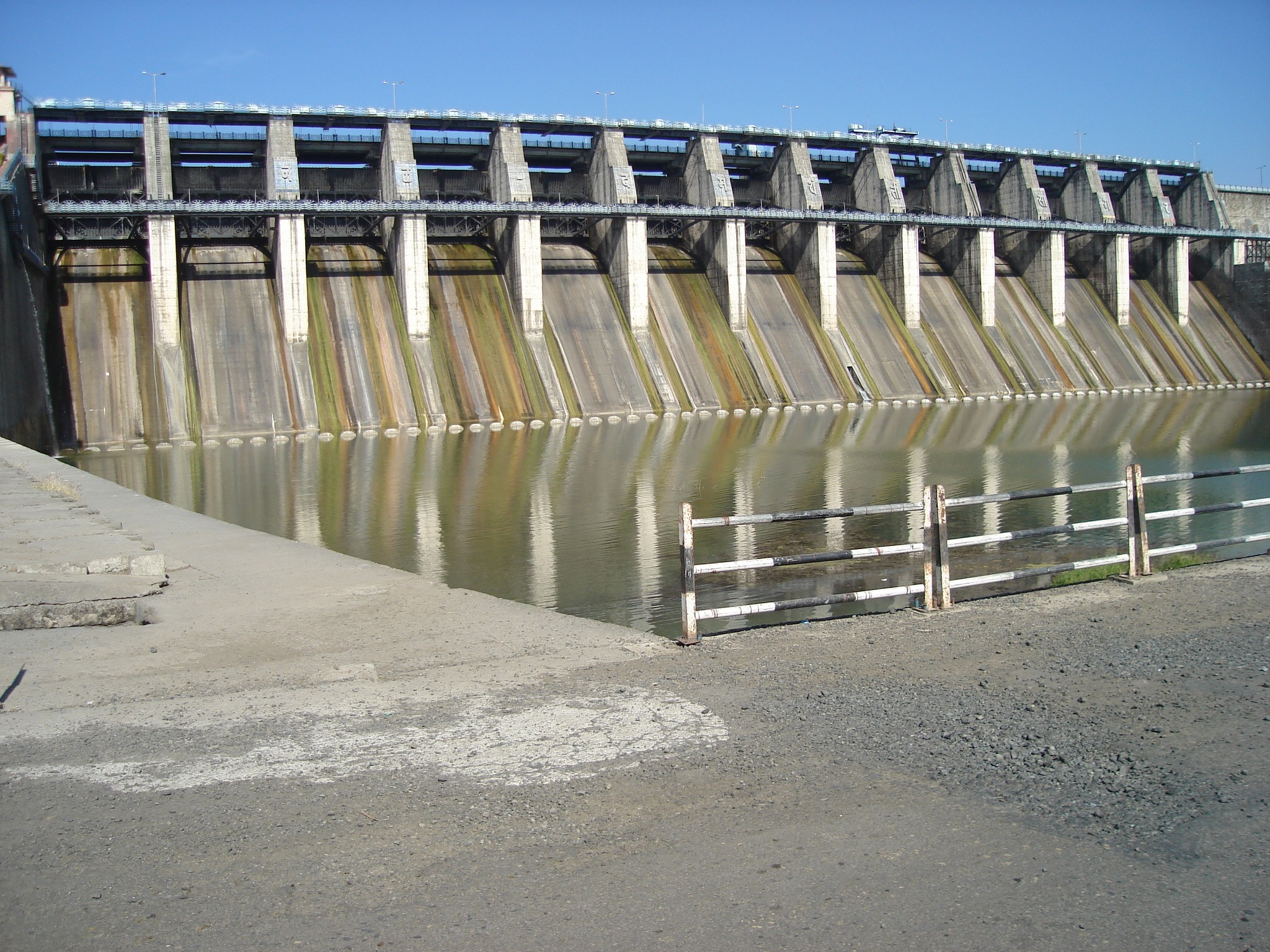
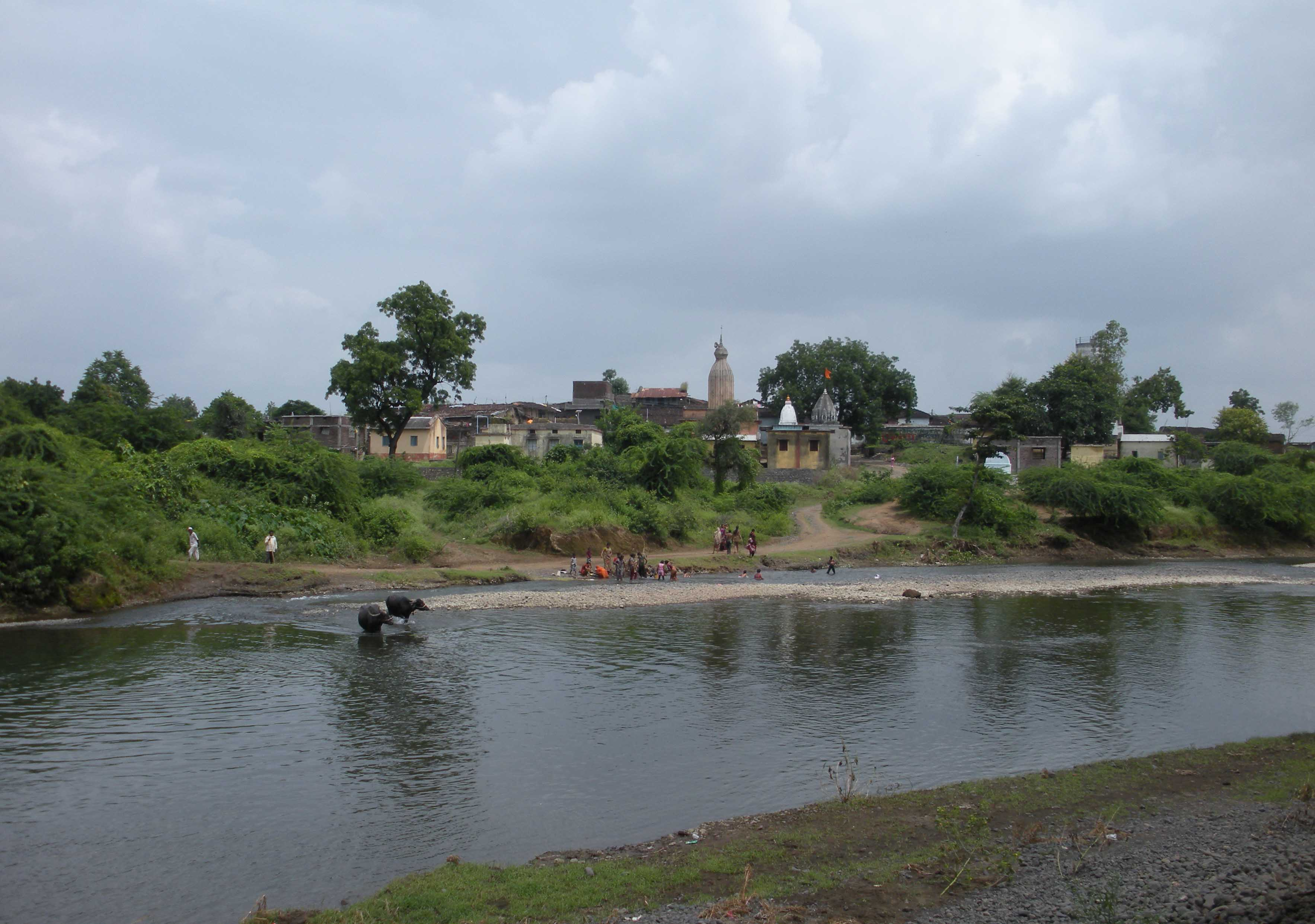
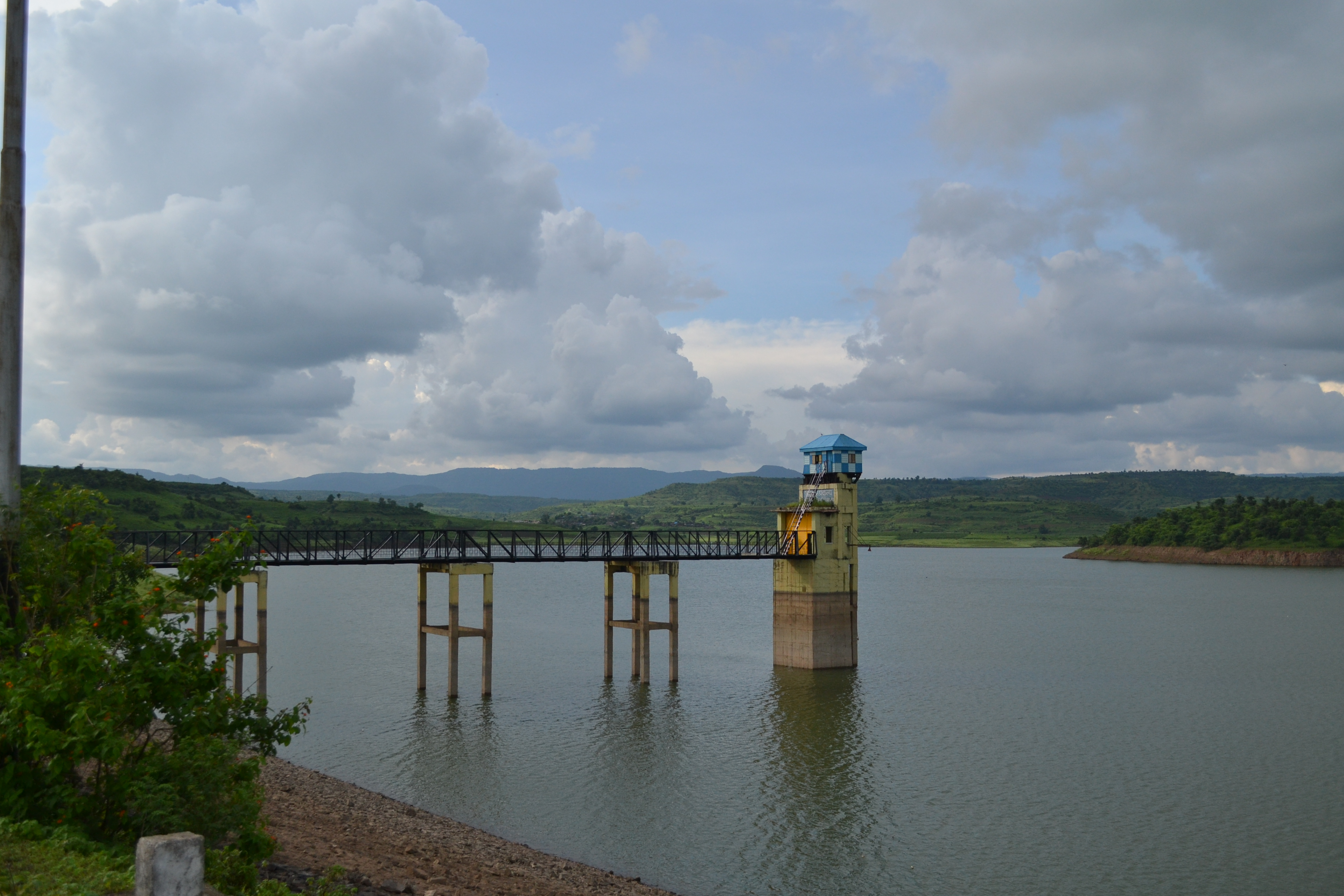
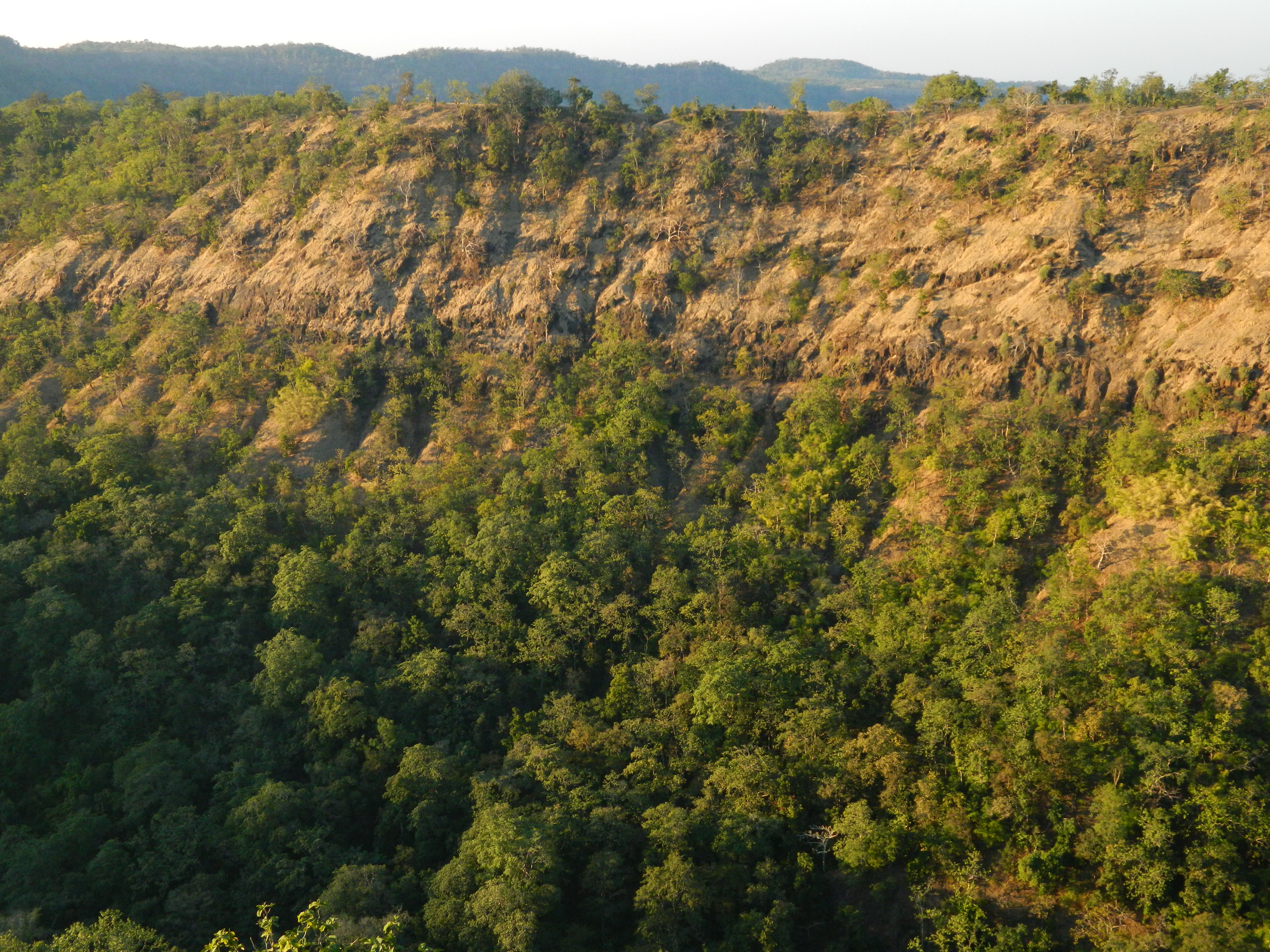
- Clockwise from top-left: Gulaba Baba Ashram in Takarkheda, Upper Wardha Dam, Shahanur Dam, Melghat, Chamak Khurd
- Interactive map of Amravati district
- Coordinates: 20.93°N 77.75°E
- Country: India
- State: Maharashtra
- Division: Amravati
- Headquarters: Amravati

Government
  - Body: Amaravati Zilla Parishad
  - Guardian Minister: Chandrashekhar Bawankule; Cabinet Minister
  - President Zilla Parishad: President Nitin Gondane; Vice-President Datta Dhomne
  - District Collector: Ashish Yerekar; (IAS)
  - CEO Zilla Parishad: Avishyant Panda (IAS)
  - MPs: Balwant Wankhade (Amravati); Amar Sharadrao Kale (Wardha)

Area
  - Total: 12,235 km^{2} (4,724 sq mi)

Population (2011)
  - Total: 2,888,445
  - Density: 213/km^{2} (550/sq mi)

Languages
  - Official: Marathi
- Time zone: UTC+5:30 (IST)
- Vehicle registration: MH-27
- Website: amravati.nic.in

Amravati district (Marathi pronunciation: [əmɾaːʋət̪iː]) is a district of Maharashtra state in central India. It is the administrative headquarter of Amravati division, which is one of the two divisions in Vidarbha (other being Nagpur), out of total 6 regions in state of Maharashtra. The district headquarters is Amravati.

The district is situated between 20°32' and 21°46' north latitudes and 76°37' and 78°27' east longitudes. The district occupies an area of 12,235 km^{2}. The district has boundaries with Betul District of Madhya Pradesh state to the north, and with the Maharashtra districts of Nagpur to the northeast, Chhindwara district of Madhya Pradesh to the northeast Wardha to the east, Yavatmal to the south, Washim to the southwest, and Akola and Buldhana districts to the west.

== History ==
In 1853, the present territory of Amravati district as a part of Berar Province was assigned to the British East India Company, following a treaty with the Nizam of Hyderabad. After the Company took over the administration of the province, it was divided into two districts. The present territory of the district became part of North Berar district, with headquarters at Buldhana. Later, the province was reconstituted and the territory of the present district became part of East Berar district, with headquarters at Amravati. In 1864, Yavatmal District (initially known as Southeast Berar district and later Wun district) was separated. In 1867, Ellichpur District was separated but in August 1905, when the whole province was reorganised into six districts, it was again merged into the district. In 1903, it became part of the newly constituted province of Central Provinces and Berar. In 1956, Amravati district became part of Bombay State and after its bifurcation in 1960, it became part of Maharashtra state.

== Geography ==
The climate is tropical. In summer temperatures can go up to higher than 47 °C (117 °F). The northern part of the district is colder as compare to rest of the district due to the hilly regions of Chikhaldara.

=== Rivers ===
The Wardha River forms the eastern boundary of the district, and the eastern portion of the district lies within its watershed. The Purna River drains the southwestern portion of the district, while the northwest is drained by the Tapti River. Other important rivers are Shahanoor and Chandrabhaga. Musali and Cherry are successfully introduced and cultivated now in Chikhaldara Hills.

The Purna rises near Bhainsdehi in the Betul district of Madhya Pradesh in the Satpudas. After flowing for about 50 km in a general southerly and south-easterly direction enters the district. It travels across the district in a south-westerly direction dividing it into two halves, first through the Achalpur taluka and then along the boundary between the Amravati and Daryapur talukas. Finally, it turns due westwards forming the boundary of the district and continues further to join the Tapti near Muktainagar in Jalgaon district. The only significant left bank tributary of the Purna is the Pedhi. The first principal right bank tributary is the Arna. The next is a small river known as the Bodi. The next tributary, the Chandrabhaga is a very important one, flowing in a general south-westerly direction to join the Purna. The principal right bank affluent of the Chandrabhaga is the Bhuleshwari. The westernmost tributary of the Purna of some significance within the district is the Shahanur, with its tributary, the Bordi.

The following are some of the other rivers in Amravati District, with their tributaries.

- Burshi River
- Surkhi River
- Tigria River
- Khandu River
- Khapra River
- Sangiya River
- Gadaga River
- Vaan River
- Wardha River
- Vidarbha River
- Bor River
- Pak Nala
- Maru River
- Narha River
- Chargar River
- Shahanoor River
- Bembala River
- Saanpan River
- Bicchan River

== Demographics ==
Historical population
Year	Pop.	±% p.a.
1901	806,859	—
1911	873,012	+0.79%
1921	827,867	−0.53%
1931	941,604	+1.30%
1941	988,524	+0.49%
1951	1,031,160	+0.42%
1961	1,232,780	+1.80%
1971	1,541,209	+2.26%
1981	1,861,410	+1.91%
1991	2,200,057	+1.69%
2001	2,607,160	+1.71%
2011	2,888,445	+1.03%

Religions in Amravati district (2011)
Religion	Percent
Hinduism	71.15%
Islam	14.59%
Buddhism	13.29%
Other or not stated	0.97%

According to the 2011 census Amravati district has a population of 2,888,445, roughly equal to the nation of Jamaica or the US state of Arkansas. This gives it a ranking of 131st in India (out of a total of 640). The district has a population density of 237 inhabitants per square kilometre (610/sq mi). Its population growth rate over the decade 2001-2011 was 10.77%. Amravati has a sex ratio of 947 females for every 1000 males, and a literacy rate of 88.23%. 35.91% of the population lives in urban areas. Scheduled Castes and Scheduled Tribes make up 17.53% and 13.99% of the population respectively.

=== Languages ===
Languages in Amravati district (2011)
1. Marathi (66.8%)
2. Urdu (11.9%)
3. Korku (8.20%)
4. Hindi (7.35%)
5. Gondi (1.85%)
6. Sindhi (1.09%)
7. Others (2.82%)

At the time of the 2011 Census of India, 66.83% of the population in the district spoke Marathi, 11.86% Urdu, 8.20% Korku, 7.35% Hindi, 1.85% Gondi and 1.09% Sindhi as their first language.

Marathi is the official and the most spoken language in the district. The dialect spoken here is called Varhadi dialect. Deccani Urdu is also prominent among the Muslim community. Korku and Gondi languages are also spoken by a significant number of people.

== Government and administration ==
=== Divisions ===
The district consists of six sub-divisions, which are further divided into 14 talukas. Amravati sub-division is divided into three talukas: Amravati, Bhatukali and Nandgaon Khandeshwar. Daryapur sub-division is further divided into two talukas: Anjangaon and Daryapur. Achalpur sub-division also consists of two talukas: Achalpur and Chandur Bazar. Morshi sub-division has also two talukas: Warud and Morshi. Dharni sub-division is also divided into two talukas: Dharni and Chikhaldara. Finally, Chandur (Railway) sub-division is divided into three talukas: Chandur (Railway), Tiosa and Dhamangaon.

There are eight Vidhan Sabha constituencies in this district. Six of these, Badnera, Amravati, Teosa, Anjangaon-Daryapur (SC), Melghat (ST) and Achalpur, are part of Amravati Lok Sabha constituency. The other two constituencies, Dhamangaon Railway and Warud-Morshi, are part of Wardha Lok Sabha constituency.

==== Major towns ====
Major towns include Achalpur, Paratwada, Warud-Orange City, Anjangaon, Chandur railway, Shirala, Walgaon, Dhamangaon Railway, Hiwarkhed, Chikhaldara, Kholapur, Morshi, Rithpur, Shendurjana Ghat, Chandurbazar, Daryapur, Nandgaon Khandeshwar, Dharni, Teosa, Badnera, and Nerpinglai.

=== Officer ===
==== Members of Parliament ====
- Balwant Wankhade INC
  (Amravati)
- Ramdas Tadas BJP
  (Wardha)

==== Guardian Minister ====
Guardian Minister Amravati
- पालकमंत्री अमरावती
- Emblem of India

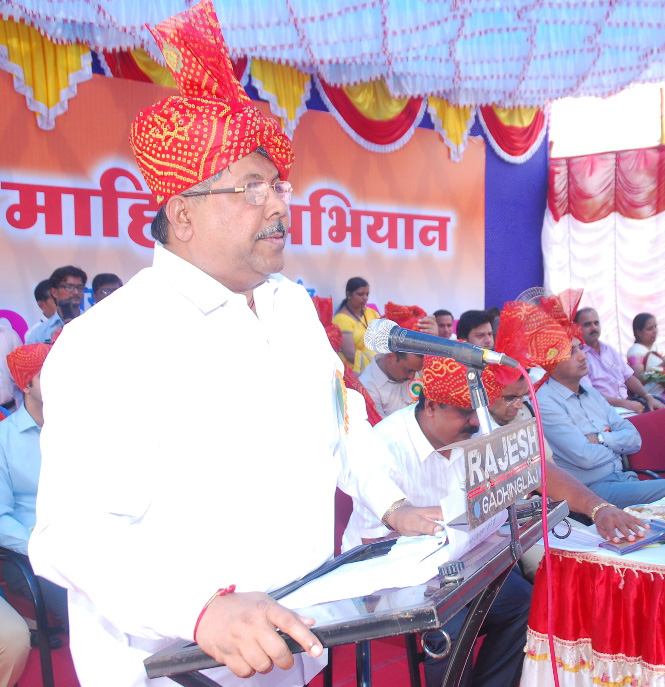
- Incumbent; Chandrakant Patil; Cabinet Minister since 4 October 2023
- Style: The Honourable
- Residence: Amravati
- Appointer: Chief Minister of Maharashtra
- Term length: 5 years / No time limit
- Website: amravati.gov.in/en/

===== List of Guardian Ministers =====
Name	Term of office
Chhagan Bhujbal; Deputy Chief Minister	7 November 2009 - 10 November 2010
Ajit Pawar; Deputy Chief Minister	11 November 2010 - 26 September 2014
Pravin Pote; Minister of State	5 December 2014 - 8 November 2019
Yashomati Chandrakant Thakur; Cabinet Minister	9 January 2020 - 29 June 2022
Devendra Fadnavis; Deputy Chief Minister	24 September 2022 - 4 October 2023
Chandrakant Patil; Cabinet Minister	4 October 2023 - Incumbent

=== District Magistrate/Collector ===
District Magistrate / Collector Amravati
- जिल्हाधिकारी तथा जिल्हदंडाधिकरी अमरावती
- Emblem of India
- Incumbent; Pavneet Kaur (IAS) since March 2019
- Residence: At Amravati district
- Appointer: Government of Maharashtra
- Term length: No time limit
- Website: amravati.gov.in/en/

=== List of District Magistrate/Collectors ===
Name	Term of office
Saurabh Katiyar (IAS)	2023 - Incumbent

== Economy ==
In 2006 the Ministry of Panchayati Raj named Amravati one of the country's 250 most backward districts (out of a total of 640). It is one of the twelve districts in Maharashtra currently receiving funds from the Backward Regions Grant Fund Programme (BRGF).

=== Agriculture ===
The district lies in the Vidharbha region and is characterized by predominantly “Black Cotton Soil” (regur soil), which is highly suitable for cotton cultivation. The climate is semi-arid with moderate rainfall, supported both Kharif and Rabi crops.

Apart from cotton and pigeon pea (Tur), the district also cultivates Soyabean, Wheat, Gram (chickpea), Jowar (sorghum), and Maize. In recent years, Soyabean emerged as a commercial crop due to its profitability and suitability to local agro-climatic conditions.

Horticulture is also developing in the region, especially in areas kike Warud and Morshi, which are known for high quality Nagpur Oranges. The district also produces chillies, bananas, and vegetables in select pockets.

Irrigation is mainly dependent on monsoon rainfall, through projects like Upper Wardha Dam contribute to irrigation in certain regions.

Main growing crops and regions; for the cotton and pigeonpea 'Tur' in Nandgaon Khandeshwar, Chandur Railway, Dhamangaon, Teosa, Achalpur particularly. Ellachipur Sanman Chili pepper. Anjangaon Surji and Achalpur are known for growing Betel Leaves, piper longum, orange and banana. Warud-Orange City, Morshi, Chandur Bazar and Achalpur are known for growing oranges.

== Places of interest ==
- Melghat Tiger Reserve, of Project Tiger
- Chikhaldara Hill Station is 85 km from Amravati via Paratwada
- Gugarnal National Park
- Wan Wildlife Sanctuary
- Gawilgarh Fort
- Osmaniya Mosque
- Jama Masjid - Built in the 17th century in the allotted area of Magar Arangpura (now known as Sabanpura) by Emperor Aurangzeb Alamgir
- Ambadevi temple - historic and ancient place to visit, related to 'Rukhminiharan' by Krishna.
- Hanuman Vyayam Prasarak Mandal (HVPM) Institute - India's biggest sport institute
- Koudanyapur (Kundinapuri) birthplace of Rukmini, Koundanyapur
- Semadoh
- Shahanur Dam, Anjangaon Surji
- Simbhora Dam (Upper Wardha Dam), Morshi
- Salbardi pilgrimage of Lord Shiva, Morshi and religious place Swami Chakradhar
- Gawilghur-a historic fort at Chikhaldara
- Anandeshwar temple lasur near Daryapur

== Transport ==
Important railway stations are Badnera Junction and Amravati Main Terminal under Bhusawal-Badnera Section of Bhusawal Division of Central Railway. The other stations under meter gauge are Wan Road Dhulghat and Dabka. These are under Purna - Khandwa section of South Central Railway. The stations under narrow gauge are Achalpur, Anjangaon Surji and Daryapur under Narrow Gauge Branch lines viz Murtajapur-Achalpur of Bhusawal Division of Central Railway.

Amravati - Narkhed line has been ready since January 2014. Railways are now available to travel from Narkhed to Bhusaval. Warud's railway station has been given the name Warud Orange City because it is the biggest exporter of oranges from all over India.

The Amravati - Chandur Bazar - Morshi - Warud Orange City - Narkher railway track is electrified.

Due to this Amravati - Narkher railway line; Railway network in Amravati district become strong. It serves three talukas and some villages also have station so people travel via railway towards Amravati, Akola, Nagpur, Nanded, Bhusawal, Jaipur, Indore, Hyderabad and Bengaluru.

Amravati Airport is located at Belora, 15 kilometres south of Amravati on National Highway 53 (National Highway 6 (India, old numbering)) towards Akola.

== Education ==
=== Engineering colleges ===
- Government College of Engineering, Amravati
- P. R. Patil Group of Educational Institutes
- Babasaheb Naik College of Engineering, Pusad

=== Polytechnic college ===
- Government Polytechnic Amravati

== Notable people ==
- Gadge Maharaj (1876-1956), social reformer
- Tukdoji Maharaj (1909-1968), social reformer and social worker and a great man in the whole world.
- Pratibha Patil, first female president of India (2008-2012)
- Panjabrao Deshmukh (1888-1965), social reformer, educationist and Central Agriculture Minister
- Harihar Vaman Deshpande (1905–1965), government Liaison & Welfare Officer
- Gopalrao Khedkar, first President of Maharashtra Pradesh Congress Committee
- Suresh Bhat (1932-2003), Marathi poet, Marathi Ghazal Samrat
- Hemant Kanitkar, Indian cricketer
- Mohan Choti (1939-1992), Hindi movie comedy actor
- Jitesh Sharma (1993), Indian Cricket Team Player

== See also ==
- Dhulghat railway station
