= Chikhaldara =

- Hill station
- Location in Maharashtra
- Coordinates: 21.21°N 77.72°E
- Country: India
- State: Maharashtra
- District: Amravati
- Elevation: 1,188 m (3,898 ft)

Population (2001)
  - Total: 4,718

Languages
  - Official: Marathi
- Time zone: UTC+5:30 (IST)
- Vehicle registration: MH- 27

Chikhaldara is a hill station and a municipal council in the Amravati district in the Indian state of Maharashtra.

Chikaldhara, literally translates from Marathi to mud stream/falls (chikal + dhara). This place was featured in the epic of the Mahabharata; it is where Bheema killed the villainous Keechaka in a herculean bout and then threw him into the valley. It thus came to be known as Keechakadara, which eventually colloquialised to Chikaldhara. Current village Manjarkapdi known as "Majkur" before 1950.

The sole hill resort in the Vidarbha region, it is situated at an altitude of 1118 meters with highest elevation point 1188 meters and has the added dimension of being the only coffee-growing area in Maharashtra. Chikhaldara has an annual rainfall of 154cm. Temperatures vary from 39C in summer to 5C in winter. The best months to visit are from October to June.

It abounds in wildlife, such as tigers, panthers, sloth bears, sambars, wild boar, and rarely seen wild dogs. Close by is the Melghat Tiger Project which has 73 tigers.

== Tourism and events ==
Since the area is heavily forested and the population count is low, there are no big festivals in Chikhaldara like in the rest of India. Only at the Jain temples that exist in the area, the pujas are held regularly.

Chikhaldara is a small hill station in the Indian state of Maharashtra. As it is the only coffee-growing area in the region, it is visited by tourists who come solely to taste the region's coffee. Apart from the coffee plantations, Chikhaldara has several lakes, waterfalls, old forts, temples, and viewpoints.

== History ==
Captain Robinson of the Hyderabad Regiment was visited Chikhaldara in 1823. The Englishmen found it particularly attractive because the lush green hue of the place reminded them of England. When the leaves fell in September/October, they were reminded of autumn in England. There was even a proposal to make it the seat of the Government of India.

== Climate ==
June, July, August, and September are the four months of Monsoon. Chikhaldara experiences heavy rainfall during these months. The average temperature during monsoon is twenty-five degree celsius and during winter it goes below 15°C. Summer is not pleasant in this place because the temperature is very high . It is good not to visit Chikhaldara during summer because the temperature here lies between 32°C to 40°C.

According to Köppen climate classification, climate of Chikhaldara is categorized as Humid Subtropical, Cwa. Chikhaldara has four distinct seasons - Winter, Summer (Late winter and early summer can be called spring but is of very short duration), Monsoon (Rainy season) and Post-monsoon or Autumn. Summers are hot and long, from mid-March to Early June. Summer temperature varies from 16°C to 41°C. Monsoon starts in early June and lasts till early October. July and October are wettest months. Chikhaldara receives averagely 1600 mm of rainfall annually. Mist following morning rain is common. Monsoon temperature ranges from 18°C to 26°C. Post-Monsoon starts mid-October and lasts till mid-November. Autumn, which is a transition between Post-Monsoon and Winter, is of short duration and lasts from mid-November to mid-December. Temperature during post monsoon and autumn ranges from 12°C to 30°C. Winters of Chikhaldara are mild with chilly, foggy mornings; pleasant, clear and sunny days; hazy and calm evenings and hazy, cool nights. Temperature in winter ranges from 4°C to 23°C.

Climate data for Chikhaldara
Month	Jan	Feb	Mar	Apr	May	Jun	Jul	Aug	Sep	Oct	Nov	Dec	Year
Mean daily maximum °C (°F)	24.6 (76.3)	27.3 (81.1)	31.6 (88.9)	35.6 (96.1)	37.1 (98.8)	31.9 (89.4)	26.4 (79.5)	25.1 (77.2)	26.8 (80.2)	28.2 (82.8)	26.3 (79.3)	24.3 (75.7)	28.8 (83.8)
Daily mean °C (°F)	17.6 (63.7)	19.8 (67.6)	23.8 (74.8)	27.2 (81.0)	29.3 (84.7)	25.8 (78.4)	22.1 (71.8)	21.2 (70.2)	22.1 (71.8)	22.0 (71.6)	19.6 (67.3)	17.4 (63.3)	22.3 (72.2)
Mean daily minimum °C (°F)	10.7 (51.3)	12.4 (54.3)	16.0 (60.8)	18.8 (65.8)	21.5 (70.7)	19.7 (67.5)	17.9 (64.2)	17.4 (63.3)	17.5 (63.5)	15.8 (60.4)	13.0 (55.4)	10.5 (50.9)	15.9 (60.7)
Average rainfall mm (inches)	16.5 (0.65)	14.7 (0.58)	10.7 (0.42)	8.6 (0.34)	20.1 (0.79)	214.1 (8.43)	537.0 (21.14)	445.0 (17.52)	305.8 (12.04)	76.7 (3.02)	46.0 (1.81)	12.7 (0.50)	1,707.9 (67.24)
Average rainy days	1.1	1.1	1.0	1.0	2.0	10.3	21.0	19.7	13.4	3.2	1.8	1.2	76.8
Source: Maharshtra state Gazetteers Amravati District (rainfall and rainy days)

== Demographics ==
As of 2001 India census, Chikhaldara had a population of 4711. Males constituted 58% of the population and females 42%. Chikhaldara had an average literacy rate of 80%, higher than the national average of 59.5%, with male literacy at 86% and female literacy at 72%. 12% of the population was under 6 years of age.

Year	Male	Female	Total Population	Change	Religion (%)							
Year	Male	Female	Total Population	Change	Hindu	Muslim	Christian	Sikhs	Buddhist	Jain	Other religions and persuasions	Religion not stated
2001	2787	1924	4711	-	67.820	13.628	5.201	0.000	13.076	0.127	0.085	0.064
2011	2789	2369	5158	0.095	63.571	15.083	8.259	0.000	12.776	0.136	0.155	0.019

== Water supply ==
Water is supplied from Shakkar lake.

== Local features of importance ==
- Melghat Tiger Reserve, which includes the Gugamal National Park
- Gawilgad fort
- Bhim-kund, where Bhima washed his hands of the blood of Keechaka
- Forest garden
- Wildlife museum
- Paratwada City

=== Tourist points ===
- Malviya point (sunrise)
- Bhimkund (Kitchakdari)
- Vairat Devi
- Sunset Point
- Bir Dam
- Panchbol Point
- Kalapani Dam
- Mahadev Mandir
- Semadhoh Tiger Project
- Hariken Point
- Mozari Point
- Prospects Point
- Devi Point
- Goraghat
- Shakkar Lake
- Government Garden
- Museums
- Waterfalls
- Dharkhora
- Bakadari
- Muktagiri
- Kolkaz
- Pancha Dharag waterfall
- Gawilgad Fort

== Connectivity ==
Chikhaldara is well connected to the cities of Paratwada, Amravati, Akola, Betul, Khandwa and Burhanpur by road. The nearest airport is Nagpur: 229 km via Paratwada-Chandur Bazar-Katol route and 231 km via Paratwada-Amravati-Kondhali route. MSRTC plies buses from Nagpur to Chikhaldara via Amravati-Paratwada.
