= Melghat =

Tiger reserve in India

Melghat Tiger Reserve
- IUCN category IV (habitat/species management area)
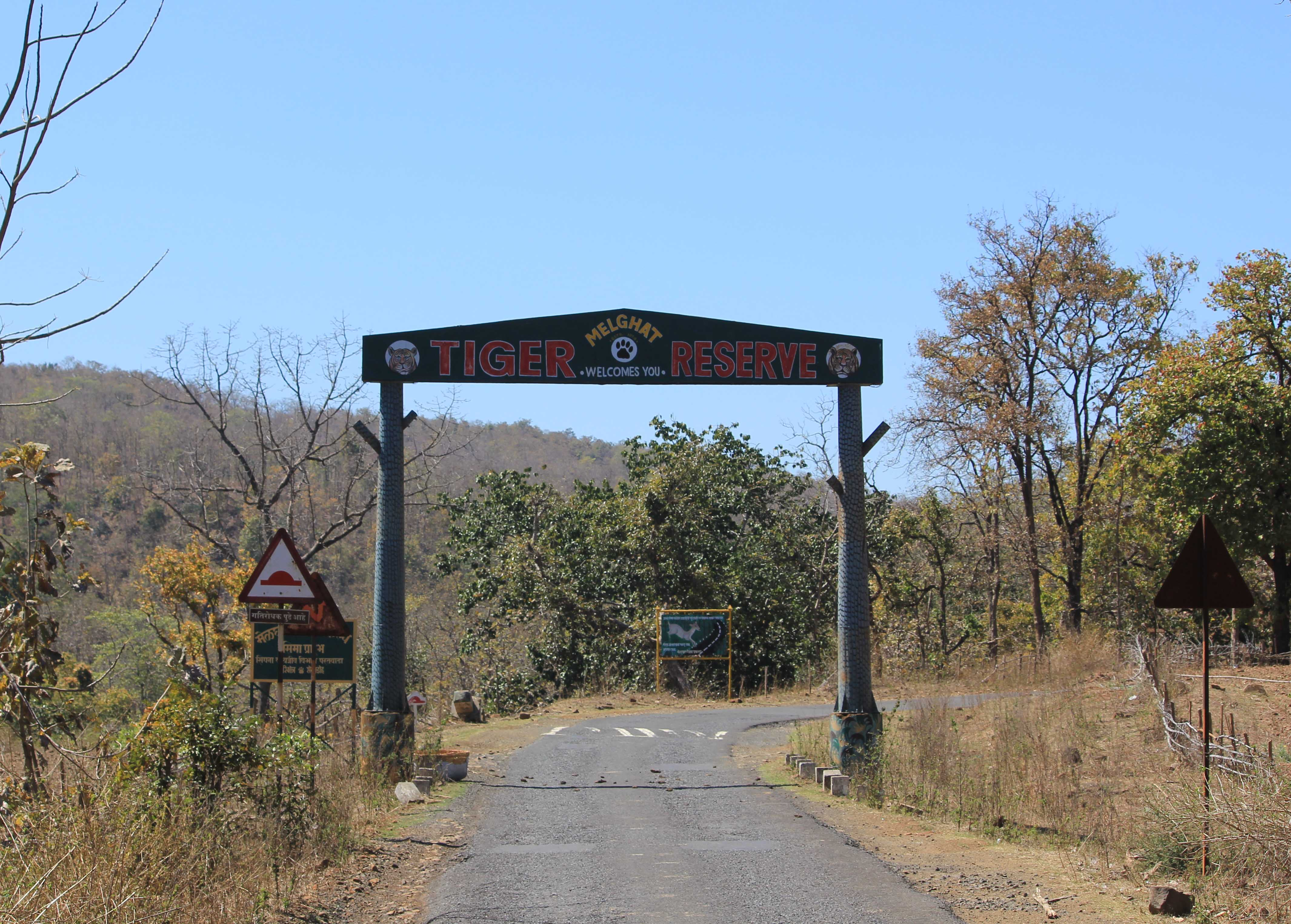
- Entry gate of Melghat Tiger Reserve

- Location within Maharashtra Location within India
- Interactive map of Melghat Tiger Reserve
- Location: Amravati District, Maharashtra, India
- Coordinates: 21°26′45″N 77°11′50″E
- Area: 2,768 km^{2} (1,069 sq mi)
- Created: 1973 (as Tiger Reserve)

Melghat was among the first nine tiger reserves of India to be notified in 1973 under Project Tiger. It is located in the northern part of Amravati District of Maharashtra. Melghat Wildlife Sanctuary was declared as in 1985. The total area of the reserve is 2,768 square kilometres.

== Geography ==
The Melghat area was declared a tiger reserve in 1974. Meghat Tiger Reserve is administratively divided into Sipna, Gugamal and Akot Wildlife Division. The total area of the reserve is around 2,768 km^{2} (1,069 sq mi).

At the northern extreme of the Amravati district of Maharashtra, on the border of Madhya Pradesh, lies the Melghat in the South-western Satpura mountain ranges. Melghat means 'meeting of the ghats', which describes the area as a large tract of unending hills and ravines scarred by jagged cliffs and steep climbs. The Tapti River flows through the northern part of Melghat Tiger Reserve and forms the boundary of the reserve together with the Gawilghur ridge of the Satpura Range. The forest is tropical dry deciduous in nature, dominated by teak (Tectona grandis). The reserve is a catchment area for five major rivers: the Khandu, Khapra, Sipna, Gadga and Dolar. These all rivers are tributaries of the river Tapti.

== Fauna ==
The fauna in Melghat includes several large animal species, such as Bengal tiger, Indian leopard, sloth bear, dhole, striped hyena, indian wolf, Indian jackal, sambar, gaur, barking deer, nilgai, chital, chausingha, honey badger, flying squirrel, wild boar, langur, rhesus monkey, indian porcupine, indian pangolin, mouse deer, python, smooth-coated otter and black-naped hare.

== Population ==
There are 61 villages in the reserve, all outside the core area. 22 are in the buffer zone and 39 in the Multiple Use Area (MUA). Human population in the buffer zone and MUA is 11024 and 15642, respectively, as per 1994 census.

The inhabitants are mainly tribal, largely of the Korku tribe (80 per cent) and others like Gond, Nihal, Balai, Gaolan, Gawali, Halbi, Wanjari, and Maratha. All inhabitants depend on the forest for bona fide domestic needs of firewood, timber, fodder, and non-timber forest products like fruit, flowers, gum and medicinal plants. Their main source of income is from labor and rainy season agriculture. They augment their income by collecting non-timber forest products like mahuali, flowers, seeds, charoli, gumcula, dhawada, tendu-leaves, and musali (a medicinal plant).

== See also ==
- Wan Wildlife Sanctuary
