= Kesla railway station =

Railway station in Madhya Pradesh

Kesla

General information
- Location: Kaveli, Narmadapuram district, Madhya Pradesh; India
- Coordinates: 22.541217°N 77.806509°E
- Elevation: 410 metres (1,350 ft)
- System: Indian Railway Station
- Owner: Indian Railways
- Operator: Central Railway
- Line: Bhopal–Nagpur section
- Platforms: 2
- Tracks: 2

Construction
- Structure type: Standard (on ground station)
- Parking: Yes
- Cycle facilities: No

Other information
- Status: Functioning
- Station code: KSLA
- Zone(s): Central Railway
- Division(s): Nagpur CR

History
- Opened: 1884

Services
Preceding station	Indian Railways	Following station
Kiratgarh towards ?	West Central Railway zone Bhopal–Nagpur branch line	Taku towards ?
Location
- Location within India Location within Madhya Pradesh

Kesla railway station is a railway station of Bhopal–Nagpur section under Nagpur CR railway division of Central Railway zone of Indian Railways. The station is situated at Kaveli in Narmadapuram district of Indian state of Madhya Pradesh.

== History ==
The Bhopal–Itarsi line was opened by the Begum of Bhopal in 1884. Itarsi and Nagpur Junction railway station was linked in between 1923 and 1924. Electrification started in Bhopal–Itarsi section in 1988–89 and the rest Itarsi to Nagpur section was electrified in 1990–91.
