= Pola Patthar railway station =

Railway station in Madhya Pradesh

Pola Patthar

General information
- Location: Dhar, Betul district, Madhya Pradesh; India
- Coordinates: 22.347657°N 77.853349°E
- Elevation: 392 metres (1,286 ft)
- System: Indian Railway Station
- Owner: Indian Railways
- Operator: West Central Railway
- Line: Bhopal–Nagpur section
- Platforms: 2
- Tracks: 2

Construction
- Structure type: Standard (on ground station)
- Parking: Yes
- Cycle facilities: No

Other information
- Status: Functioning
- Station code: POX
- Zone(s): West Central Railway
- Division(s): Nagpur CR

History
- Opened: 1884

Services
Preceding station	Indian Railways	Following station
Kala Akhar towards Bhopal Junction	West Central Railway zone Bhopal–Nagpur section	Dhodra Mohar towards Nagpur Junction
Location
- Location within India Location within Madhya Pradesh

Pola Patthar railway station is a railway station of Bhopal–Nagpur section under Nagpur CR railway division of West Central Railway zone of Indian Railways. The station is situated at Dhar in Betul district of Indian state of Madhya Pradesh.

== History ==
The Bhopal–Itarsi line was opened by the Begum of Bhopal in 1884. Itarsi and Nagpur Junction railway station was linked in between 1923 and 1924. Electrification started in Bhopal–Itarsi section in 1988–89 and the rest Itarsi to Nagpur section was electrified in 1990–91.
