= Saheli railway station =

Railway station in Madhya Pradesh

Saheli

General information
- Location: Saheli, Taku, Narmadapuram district, Madhya Pradesh; India
- Coordinates: 22.488281°N 77.819849°E
- Elevation: 388 metres (1,273 ft)
- System: Indian Railway Station
- Owner: Indian Railways
- Operator: West Central Railway
- Line: Bhopal–Nagpur section
- Platforms: 2
- Tracks: 2

Construction
- Structure type: Standard (on ground station)
- Platform levels: On ground
- Parking: Yes
- Cycle facilities: No

Other information
- Status: Functioning
- Station code: SAHL
- Zone(s): West Central Railway
- Division(s): Nagpur CR

History
- Opened: 1884

Services
Preceding station	Indian Railways	Following station
Taku towards ?	West Central Railway zone Bhopal–Nagpur branch line	Kala Akhar towards ?
Location
- Location within India Location within Madhya Pradesh

Saheli railway station is a railway station of Bhopal–Nagpur section under Nagpur CR railway division of West Central Railway zone of Indian Railways. The station is situated at Saheli, Taku in Narmadapuram district of Indian state of Madhya Pradesh.

== History ==
The Bhopal–Itarsi line was opened by the Begum of Bhopal in 1884. Itarsi and Nagpur Junction railway station was linked in between 1923 and 1924. Electrification started in Bhopal–Itarsi section in 1988–89 and the rest Itarsi to Nagpur section was electrified in 1990–91.
