= Dhodra Mohar railway station =

Railway station in Madhya Pradesh

Dhodra Mohar

General information
- Location: Bhoura, Betul district, Madhya Pradesh; India
- Coordinates: 22.281504°N 77.875226°E
- Elevation: 377 metres (1,237 ft)
- System: Indian Railway Station
- Owner: Indian Railways
- Operator: West Central Railway
- Line: Bhopal–Nagpur section
- Platforms: 2
- Tracks: 2

Construction
- Structure type: Standard (on ground station)
- Parking: Yes
- Cycle facilities: No

Other information
- Status: Functioning
- Station code: DOH
- Zone(s): West Central Railway
- Division(s): Nagpur CR

History
- Opened: 1884

Services
| Preceding station | Indian Railways | Following station |
|---|---|---|
| Pola Patthar towards Bhopal Junction | West Central Railway zone Bhopal–Nagpur section | Magardoh towards Nagpur Junction |
Location
- Location within India Location within Madhya Pradesh

Dhodra Mohar railway station is a railway station of Bhopal–Nagpur section under Nagpur CR railway division of West Central Railway zone of Indian Railways. The station is situated at Bhoura in Betul district of Indian state of Madhya Pradesh.

== History ==
The Bhopal–Itarsi line was opened by the Begum of Bhopal in 1884. Itarsi and Nagpur Junction railway station was linked in between 1923 and 1924. Electrification started in Bhopal–Itarsi section in 1988–89 and the rest Itarsi to Nagpur section was electrified in 1990–91.
