= Joginder Nagar railway station =

Railway station in Himachal Pradesh

Jogindernagar Railway Station
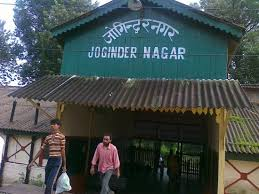
- Entry Point of Joginder Nagar Railway Station

General information
- Location: Joginder Nagar, Himachal Pradesh; India
- Coordinates: 31.9889°N 76.7895°E
- Elevation: 1,220 m (4,000 ft)
- System: Indian Railways station
- Owner: Indian Railways
- Line: Kangra Valley Railway
- Platforms: 1
- Tracks: 2 (narrow gauge)
- Connections: Auto stand

Construction
- Structure type: standard (on-ground station)
- Parking: No
- Cycle facilities: No
- Accessible: No

Other information
- Status: Functioning
- Station code: JGNX
- Zone(s): Northern Railways
- Division(s): Jammu

History
- Opened: 1929–1930

Passengers
- 50 to 100 passenger per day
Location
- Location within India Location within Himachal Pradesh

Joginder Nagar railway station is a railway station serving Joginder Nagar town, Himachal Pradesh in India. The station lies in the Kangra Valley Railway and under Jammu railway division of Northern Railway zone of Indian Railways.It is a small railway station in Joginder Nagar in Mandi district of Himachal Pradesh.

It is located at 1189 m above sea level and has one platform. As of 2016, three trains halt at this station.

== Trains ==
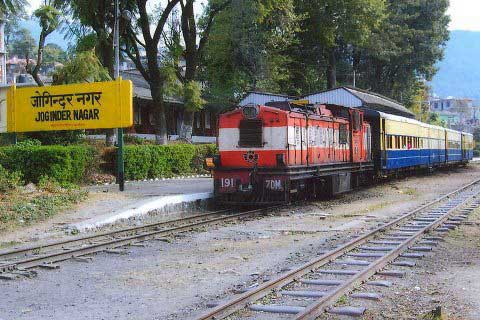
Trains standing at Joginder Nagar railway station

Up and downs trains-

- Joginder Nagar–Pathankot
- Joginder Nagar–Pathankot
- Joginder Nagar–Pathankot
- Pathankot–Joginder Nagar
- Pathankot–Joginder Nagar
- Pathankot–Joginder Nagar

== History ==
The whole line was made by British because of the Shanan Hydropower project in Joginder Nagar. Thus the railway station of Joginder Nagar was created in 1929.. After independence of India from British empire, the railway was heavily used by the government of India due lack of roads and other infrastructure. The track remained the main connection for Himachal Pradesh and the hilly areas till around the 1970s. With the introduction of roads its importance started to decline.

== Modification ==
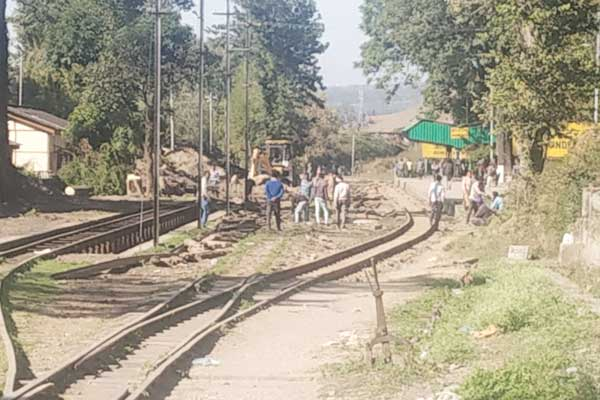
Progress working at Jogindernagar railway station

On 22 Dec 2018, Railway Minister Piyush Goyal has asked ministry officials to explore possibilities to reduce the journey time between Joginder Nagar station in Himachal Pradesh and Pathankot station in Punjab by three hours. After an aerial survey of the section with Himachal Pradesh Chief Minister Jai Ram Thakur, Goyal said, "I was surprised to know that this 164-km journey takes nine hours". He has ordered the railway authorities in Dharamshala to conduct a fresh survey of the route to "reduce this nine-hour tiring journey to a moderate six-hour journey". He said he has asked the Railway Board to build new transparent vistadome coaches, used in European trains, to allow passengers on the route to have a wider scenic view of the region. The Union minister said old rail lines on Pathankot–Joginder Nagar route will be replaced and free wi-fi facility will be made available at 17 major stations on the section. Goyal said the improvements will help the region attract more tourists. The railways and the state government will work together to encourage film shootings on these tracks, he said. Kangra valley stations will be upgraded to give it a heritage look.

== Gallery ==
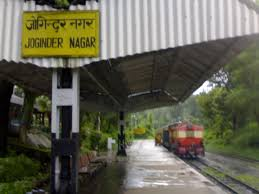
Jogindernagar platform

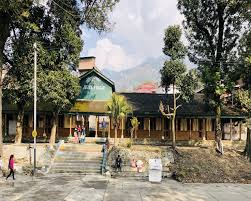
Railway station

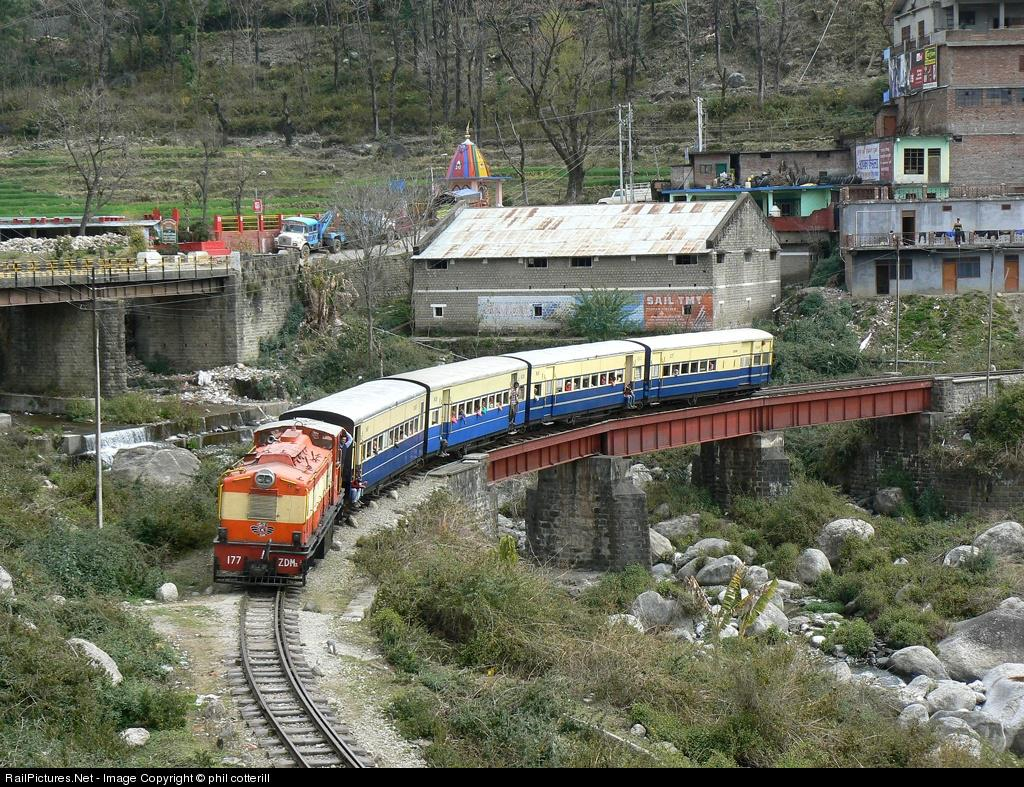
Train passing through Joginder Nagar Bridge

== See also ==
- Palampur Himachal railway station
- Kangra railway station
- Jawalamukhi Road railway station
- Pathankot Junction railway station
