= MJY =

MJY, mJy, or mjy can refer to:

- Mighty Joe Young (disambiguation), several things in entertainment
- Mohican language, a language spoken by the indigenous people of New York and Vermont states, U.S., by ISO 639 code
- Millijansky, an SI unit for measuring flux density equal to one thousandth of a jansky
- Mount Joy station (Pennsylvania), a train station in Mount Joy, Pennsylvania, U.S.
- Maramjhiri railway station, a train station in Betul district, Madhya Pradesh, India
- SS Vandyck (1911), an ocean liner that sailed from 1911 to 1914, by call sign
- Acaulospora, a genus of fungi, by Catalogue of Life identifier
