= KQE =

KQE or kqe may refer to:

- KQE, the Indian Railways station code for Kala Akhar railway station, Madhya Pradesh, India
- kqe, the ISO 639-3 code for Kalagan language, Philippines
