= Jujharpur railway station =

Railway station in Madhya Pradesh

Jujharpur

General information
- Location: Jujharpur, Itarsi, Narmadapuram district, Madhya Pradesh; India
- Coordinates: 22.598117°N 77.755836°E
- Elevation: 323 metres (1,060 ft)
- System: Indian Railway Station
- Owner: Indian Railways
- Operator: West Central Railway
- Line: Bhopal–Nagpur section
- Tracks: 2

Construction
- Structure type: Standard (on ground station)
- Parking: Yes
- Cycle facilities: No

Other information
- Status: Functioning
- Station code: JUH
- Zone(s): West Central Railway
- Division(s): Bhopal

History
- Opened: 1884

Services
Preceding station	Indian Railways	Following station
Itarsi Junction towards ?	West Central Railway zone Bhopal–Nagpur branch line	Kiratgarh towards ?
Location
- Location within India Location within Madhya Pradesh

Jujharpur railway station is a railway station of Bhopal–Nagpur section under Bhopal railway division of West Central Railway zone of Indian Railways. The station is situated at Jujharpur, Itarsi in Narmadapuram district of Indian state of Madhya Pradesh.

== History ==
The Bhopal–Itarsi line was opened by the Begum of Bhopal in 1884. Itarsi and Nagpur Junction railway station was linked in between 1923 and 1924. Electrification started in Bhopal–Itarsi section in 1988–89 and the rest Itarsi to Nagpur section was electrified in 1990–91.
