= Dhamangaon railway station =

Railway station in Maharashtra, India

Dhamangaon

General information
- Location: Dhamangaon, Amravati district, Maharashtra; India
- Coordinates: 20.7847°N 78.1384°E
- Elevation: 300 m (980 ft)
- Operator: Indian Railways; Central Railway Zone; Nagpur railway division
- Line: Howrah–Nagpur–Mumbai line
- Platforms: 2
Location
- Location within India Location within Maharashtra

Dhamangaon railway station is a railway station serving Dhamangaon town, in Amravati district of Maharashtra State of India. It is under Nagpur railway division of Central Railway Zone of Indian Railways. It is located on Howrah–Nagpur–Mumbai line of the Indian Railways.

It is located at 300 m above sea level and has two platforms. As of 2016, an electrified double broad gauge railway line exists and at this station, 40 trains stop. Nagpur Airport is at distance of 105 kilometers. It is one of the cleanest railway station in Nagpur rail mandal.
