= Kangra railway station =

Railway station in Himachal Pradesh, India

Kangra Railway Station काँगड़ा रेलवे स्टेशन

General information
- Location: Kangra, Himachal Pradesh; India
- Coordinates: 32.0851°N 76.2625°E
- Elevation: 674 metres (2,211 ft)
- System: Indian Railways station
- Owner: Indian Railways
- Operator: Northern Railway
- Line: Kangra Valley Railway
- Platforms: 1
- Tracks: 2 (Narrow Gauge)
- Connections: Auto stand

Construction
- Structure type: Standard (on-ground station)
- Parking: No
- Cycle facilities: No

Other information
- Status: Functioning
- Station code: KGRA
- Zone(s): Northern Railway
- Division(s): Firozpur

History
- Opened: 1929
Location
- Location within Himachal Pradesh Location within India

Kangra railway station is a main railway station in Kangra district in the Indian state of Himachal Pradesh. The station lies on Kangra Valley Railway. It is located at an altitude of 674 metres (2,211 ft) above mean sea level. It was allotted the railway code of KGRA under the jurisdiction of Firozpur railway division. The 610 mm (2 ft)-wide narrow gauge was opened for traffic in 1929. In 1929 the line was regauged to 762 mm (2 ft 6 in)-wide narrow gauge.

== See also ==
- Palampur Himachal railway station
- Joginder Nagar railway station
- Jawalamukhi Road railway station
- Pathankot Junction railway station
