= Palampur Himachal railway station =

Railway station in Himachal Pradesh

Palampur Himachal Railway Station पालमपुर हिमाचल रेलवे स्टेशन

General information
- Location: Maranda, Palampur, Himachal Pradesh; India
- Coordinates: 32.0814°N 76.5158°E
- Elevation: 1,119 metres (3,671 ft)
- System: Indian Railways station
- Owner: Indian Railways
- Operator: Northern Railway
- Line: Kangra Valley Railway
- Platforms: 1
- Tracks: 2 (Narrow Gauge)
- Connections: Auto stand

Construction
- Structure type: Standard (on-ground station)
- Parking: No
- Cycle facilities: No

Other information
- Status: Functioning
- Station code: PLMX
- Zone(s): Northern Railway
- Division(s): Firozpur

History
- Opened: 1929

Passengers
- 200 to 250 passengers per day
Location
- Location within Himachal Pradesh Location within India

Palampur Himachal Railway Station is a small railway station in Kangra district in the Indian state of Himachal Pradesh. The station lies on Kangra Valley Railway. Palampur Himachal railway station is at an elevation of 1,119 metres (3,671 ft). It was allotted the railway code of PLMX under the jurisdiction of Firozpur railway division. The 610 mm (2 ft)-wide narrow gauge was opened for traffic in 1929. In 1929 the line was regauged to 762 mm (2 ft 6 in)-wide narrow gauge.

== Trains ==
- 52464/52463 Baijnath–Pathankot Kangra Valley Rail Passenger
- 52468/52467 Baijnath–Pathankot Kangra Valley Rail Passenger
- 52466/52465 Baijnath–Pathankot Kangra Valley Rail Passenger
- 52470/52469 Joginder Nagar–Pathankot Kangra Valley Rail Passenger
- 52472/52471 Joginder Nagar–Pathankot Kangra Valley Passenger
- 52474/52473 Joginder Nagar–Pathankot Kangra Valley Passenger

== See also ==
- Joginder Nagar railway station
- Kangra railway station
- Jawalamukhi Road railway station
- Pathankot Junction railway station
