= Rail maintenance =

- Motive power depot
- Railway workshop
- Track maintenance
