= DHQ =

DHQ may refer to:

- 3-Dehydroquinic acid, the first carbocyclic intermediate of the shikimate pathway
- Digital Humanities Quarterly, a peer-reviewed open-access academic journal covering all aspects of digital media in the humanities
- DHQ, the station code for Dharakhoh railway station, Madhya Pradesh, India
