= Kesla =

Kesla may refer to:

- Kasla, depopulated Palestinian village
- Kesla railway station, India
- Keshla, a settlement in Baku, Azerbaijan
