= Kangra Valley Railway =

Indian narrow gauge railway line

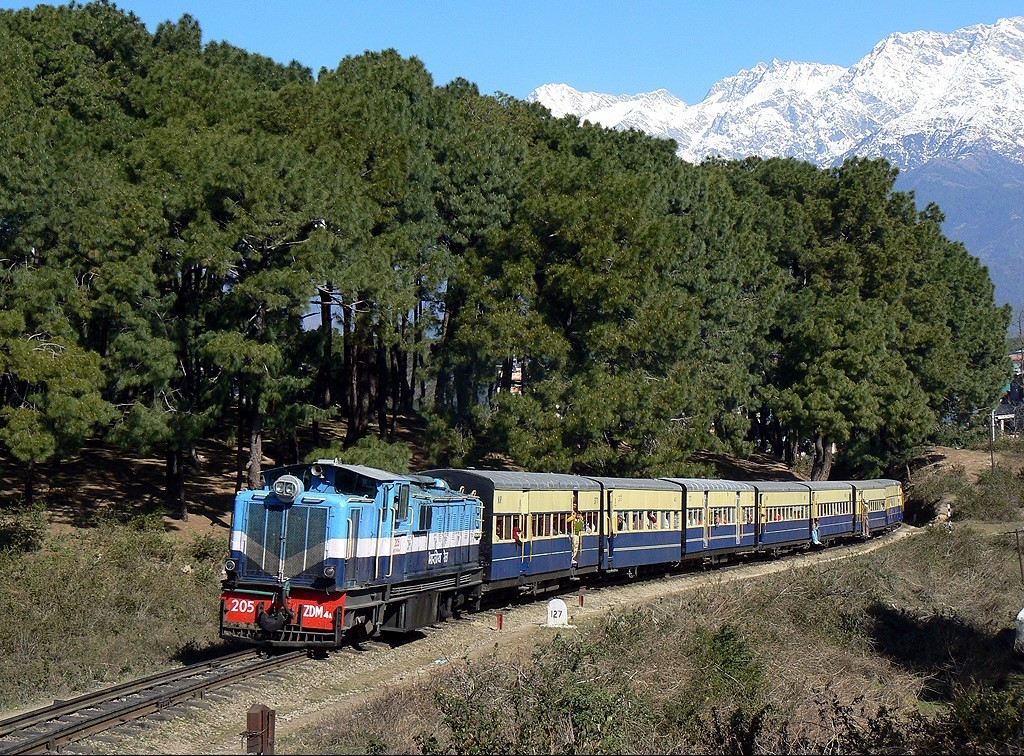
- ZDM4A hauling KVR near mile marker 127 (Palampur)
- Terminus: Pathankot-Joginder Nagar
- Coordinates: 32°04′53″N 76°30′57″E
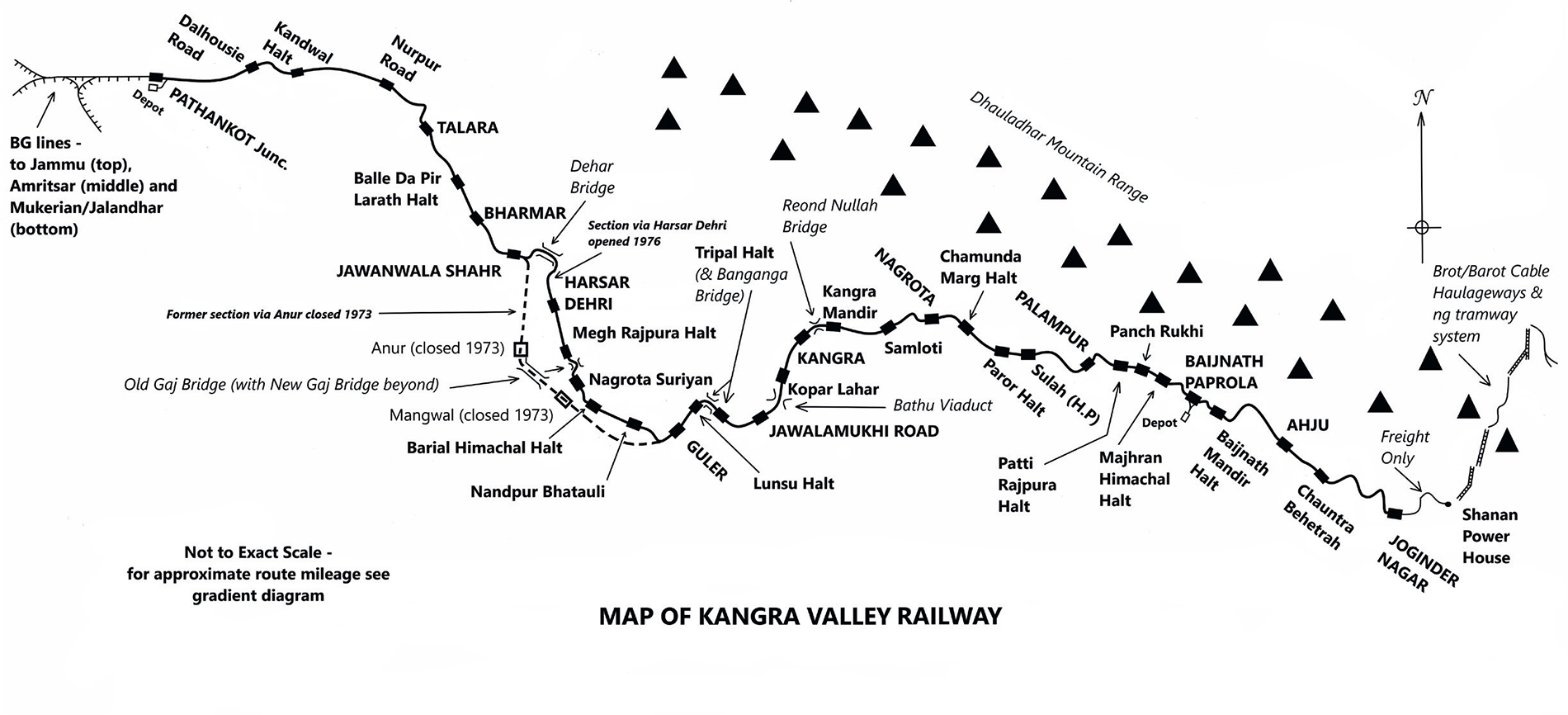
- Kangra Valley Railway Map

Commercial operations
- Built by: Capt. Ernest Bertram Neave Taylor (02 October 1888 – October 1974)

Preserved operations
- Owned by: Indian Railways
- Operated by: Northern Railway
- Stations: 33
- Length: 164 km
- Preserved gauge: 2 ft 6 in (762 mm)

Commercial history
- Opened: 1928
- 1929: First time opened for passengers
- 1942: Disruption in service beyond Nagrota
- 1954: Full Line of KVR restored
- 1973: Disruption is service due to realignment of line, restored in 1976
- 1976: Diesel Engines introduced on KVR, end of Steam Loco era.

Preservation history
- Headquarters: Jammu

Website
- http://www.kangrarail.com/

The Kangra Valley Railway is a 2 ft 6 in (762 mm) gauge railway that runs from Pathankot, Punjab to Jogindernagar in Himachal Pradesh. It runs through the sub-Himalayan region of Kangra Valley and is 164 km (101.9 mi) long.The railway is part of the Jammu division of Northern Railway. The highest point on this line is Ahju station at an elevation of 1,290 meters (4,230 ft). There are 33 stops and 950 bridges.

== History ==
Though original intent of Kangra Railway was to open up Kangra & Kullu valleys for their rich natural resources like timber as well as minerals, and surveys were also carried out in 1912 and 1914 for the same purpose. However, the prospects of such a project were not remunerative enough for the government and therefore, the idea was dropped. However, with proposed Uhl Hydropower project at Shanan, this project was again revived in the budget of 1926–1927.

Proposals have been under consideration for some years for introducing a system of narrow Gauge railways into Kangra District with the object of opening out rich Kulu & Kangra Valleys, and preliminary surveys were carried out in 1912 and 1914 for this purpose. The prospects however, did not appear to be sufficiently remunerative and the proposals were, therefore, dropped. The project has recently been revived in connection with Uhl Hydro Electric Scheme of Punjab Government as that government consider a Railway or Tramway of some kind to be necessary both for construction of their scheme and for upkeep and patrolling of transmission lines after construction is completed. While assisting in the materialization of the Uhl Hydro Electric Scheme, the line will at the same time contribute, to the general development of the rich and fertile country traversed, and in particular will promote the cultivation and export of fruits and vegetables in Kulu; will improve the accessibility of the hill stations of Dalhousie and Dharamsala; will at the same time encourage the formation of summer resorts for the residents of Lahore and Amritsar in the Kangra Valley itself; and will provide railway communications to several ancient Hindu shrines in the Kangra District which form important places of pilgrimages for people in the Punjab.

— Sir Clement Hindley, Chief Commissioner for Railways, Budget Speech (1926-27),

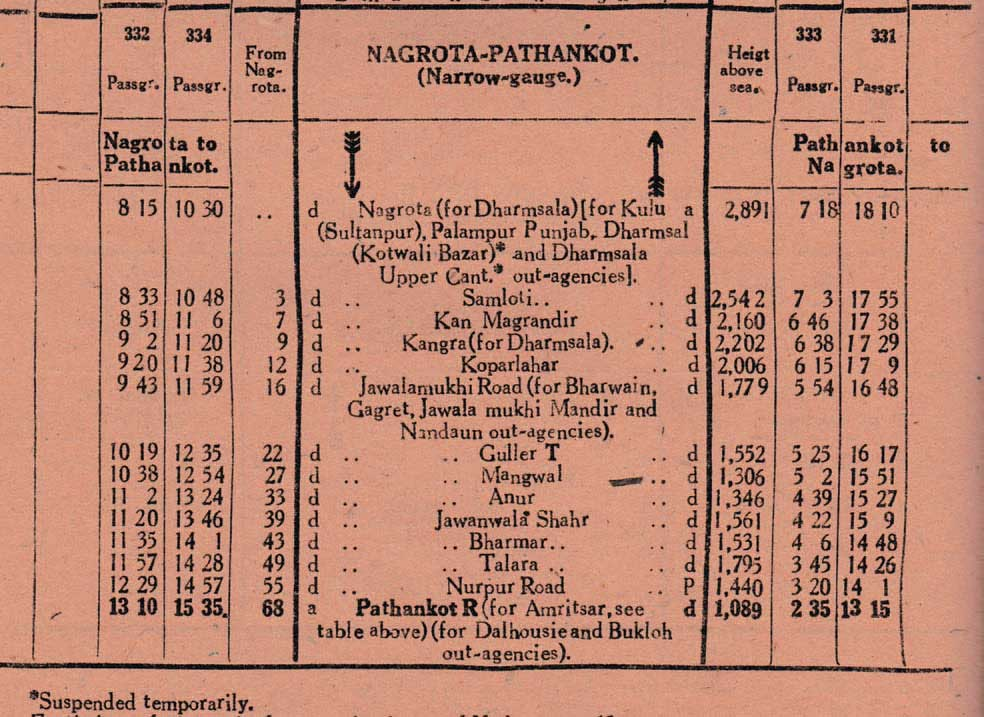
Truncated line-1945 timetable

On May 2, 1926, the ground breaking ceremony of Kangra Valley Railway(KVR) was performed by William Malcolm Hailey, the then Governor of Punjab Province. The construction of Kangra Valley Railway was entrusted to North Western State Railway(NWR) under Capt. E.B.N Taylor, Superintendent of Works. The 110 km (68 mi) long section between Pathankot and Nagrota was completed on 1 December 1928. Thus, a portion of KVR was opened for freight transportation at that time. While the rest of section from Nagrota to Joginder Nagar was completed on 1 April 1929. Hence, the KVR was also opened for passengers in April 1929.
Though original cost to build the KVR was estimated to be Rs 113 Lakhs, however, due to cost overruns and project delays, the final expenditure incurred on KVR was almost Rs. 296 Lakh, more than double from original estimate.
In 1942, at the time when World War II was at its peak, a section of the line and other Iron infrastructure from Nagrota to Joginder Nagar was dismantled and shipped off for British operations in the Middle East as a part of War effort, which caused disruption in the Operation of KVR. At that time the Line was temporarily truncated beyond Nagrota and operational section was only 67 miles (108 km) from Pathankot to Nagrota. It was only after 12 long years, post-Independence on 15 April 1954, that the infrastructure of KVR was restored and its operations resumed when Lal Bahadur Shastri, was Railway Minister of India.
Again in 1973, when the Maharana Pratap Sagar was constructed, a small section of about 25 km (16 mi) on KVR had to be realigned to the reservoir. Hence, the line was dismantled between Jawanwala Shahr and Guler on 11 April 1973 and diverted onto higher grounds along the eastern shore of the new reservoir. The Older section between these two stations, along with Anur and Mangwal stations was abandoned, and the new alignment with several new stations opened three years later on 29 December 1976.

== Technical details of KVR ==
The entire length of the 163.720 km (101.731 mi) of Kangra Valley Railway starting from plains of Pathankot (383.820m amsl) in Punjab up to Joginder Nagar (1184.160m amsl) in the foothills of Dhauladhar ranges in Mandi District blends with the landscapes of Kangra Valley which is overlooked by snow clad mighty Dhauladhar Ranges.

Hence, negotiating this line through such hilly terrain marked with steep climbs, gaping valleys through which flow, the violent and loud streams, was not an easy task. Therefore, construction of line on such a terrain involved construction of various Bridges, Blasting of Rocks for cut sections and Tunnels. Therefore, this makes KVR a unique Railway in terms of following notable features in its short span of about 164 km (102 mi).

1. Total bridges= 993
2. Total curves 484, with Curve number 300, being the sharpest (58.33 m [191.4 ft]).
3. Total tunnels = 2 Tunnels- Dhundi 76 m [250 ft] and Daulatpur 328 m [1,075 ft].
4. Maximum gradient= 1 ft in 25 ft, Just beyond Baijnath Paprola (BJPL) Station.

== Signalling on KVR ==
Neale's Ball token instrument

=== Safety mechanism ===
KVR uses the Neale's Ball Token based signalling system. It is an electro-mechanical instrument invented by J.E. Neale, who was the Telegraph Superintendent of the erstwhile Great Indian Peninsular(GIP) Railway (Now Central railway) and first used in 1933. It ensures safety of train operations, particularly on a single line KVR, by dispensing tokens. These tokens are the authority given by stationmaster to Loco Pilot to enter the block (section between the two stations).
The token is in the form of metal balls, with varying diameter, which is released by a Ball token instrument at each station. Only One token is issued for each direction at a time after ensuring that previous train has already cleared the section and there is no other train between the station. Hence the Instrument releases token only when the line is clear for proceeding to next station. Each station has one such instrument for each direction, which are electrically connected to similar instruments provided at the adjoining stations on either side. This ensures that only one train can enter the block sections at a time.
These metal Balls are strung on a ring and given to the Loco Pilot and at the same time the ball token ring given to loco pilot by preceding station is received from him. Neale's Ball Token based signalling system has been an integral part and heritage of KVR. Very few Railway lines apart from KVR use Neale's Ball Token system.

=== Block signalling ===
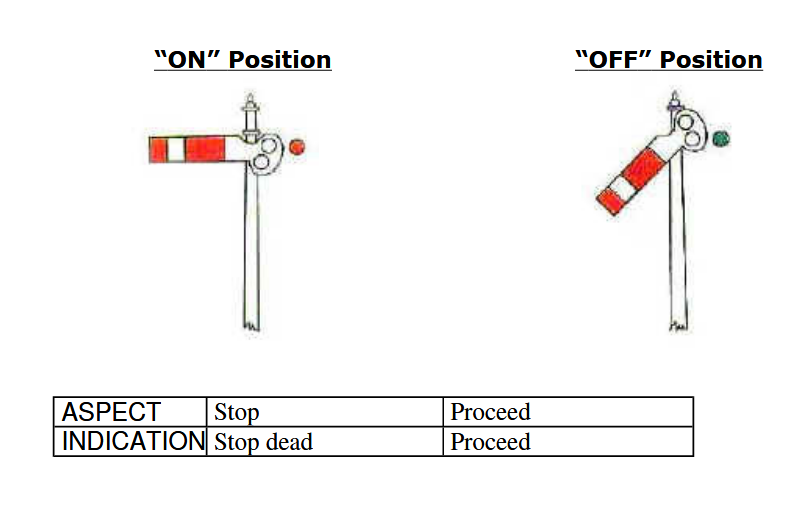
Diagram of Semaphore Lower Quadrant, two-aspect Color Lamp Signalling

For the signalling on the block, the Two-aspect Lower Quadrant(2LQ) Semaphore signalling is used on KVR. The Semaphore can only be in two positions.

1. The horizontal 'ON' position shows the most restrictive indication (requiring the train to stop or slow down or proceed with caution depending on the kind of signal), and
2. A lowered position where the semaphore arm is at about 60 degrees or more from the horizontal shows the clear or proceed indication allowing a train to go past the signal.

It is a Two-aspect color-lamp signalling in which each signal has two glass lenses (one above the other). The higher of the two Lamps is a green lamp, and the lower one is a red lamp. The green lamp when lit indicates 'Clear' (the proceed indication), and when the red lamp is lit, the signal is said to be in the 'ON' position, displaying its most restrictive indication. It utilizes a single wire or cable connecting the signal lever at the cabin, where the signal frame is located; to the actual semaphore mechanism on the signal post. Operating the signal lever to take the signal off causes the transmission wire to be pulled, moving the semaphore arm to the required aspect.

== Route details of KVR ==
In terms of elevation as well as general direction of line, KVR Line can be divided into 3 sections.

=== Section A: Pathankot to Guler ===
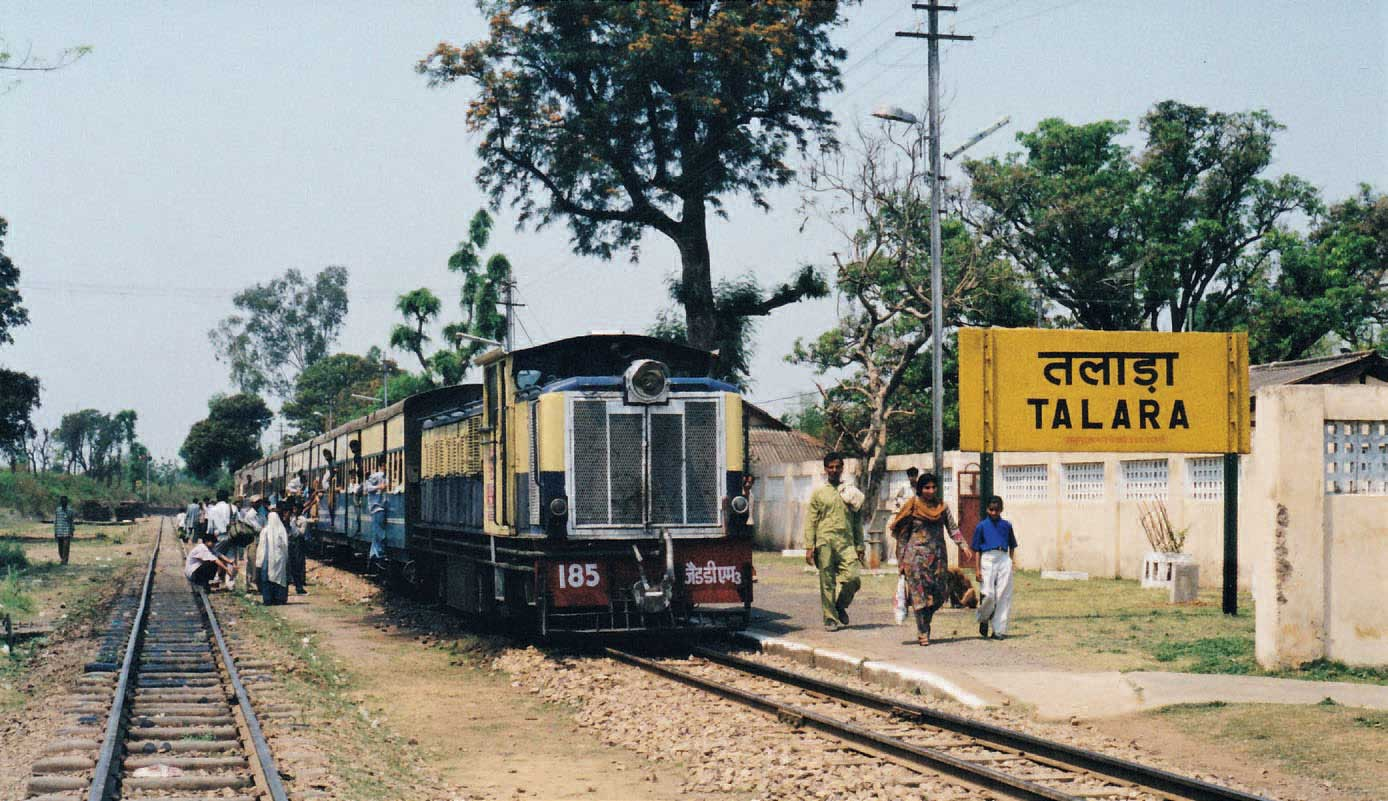
Talara Railway Station

It is about 45 miles (72 km) long section and starts from Pathankot Junction to Chakki Bridge in Punjab. Pathankot has loco shed, carriage sub-deport of Kangra Valley railway. Line leaves pathankot from the east of the town, passes a number of level crossings, after which the rural nature of line becomes apparent. It makes its first call at Dalhousie road station, which has a passing loop. After the line leaves this station, it heads south and crosses the Chakki river bridge. After crossing chakki bridge, train heads eastwards once more towards the next station at Kandwal. For a while, no trains made a call at Kandwal, however, now the halt has been reinstated. Both Dalhousie Road and Kandwal halt were additional stops, not in the original plans, which were added sometimes during late 1970s to early 1980s, after reopening of line through new diversionary route.

Next station is Nurupur Road, which connects Nurpur town, erstwhile capital of medieval dynasty of Pathania rulers. As line leaves Nurpur Town, it takes a southwards loop to reach Talara, the next stop on KVR.

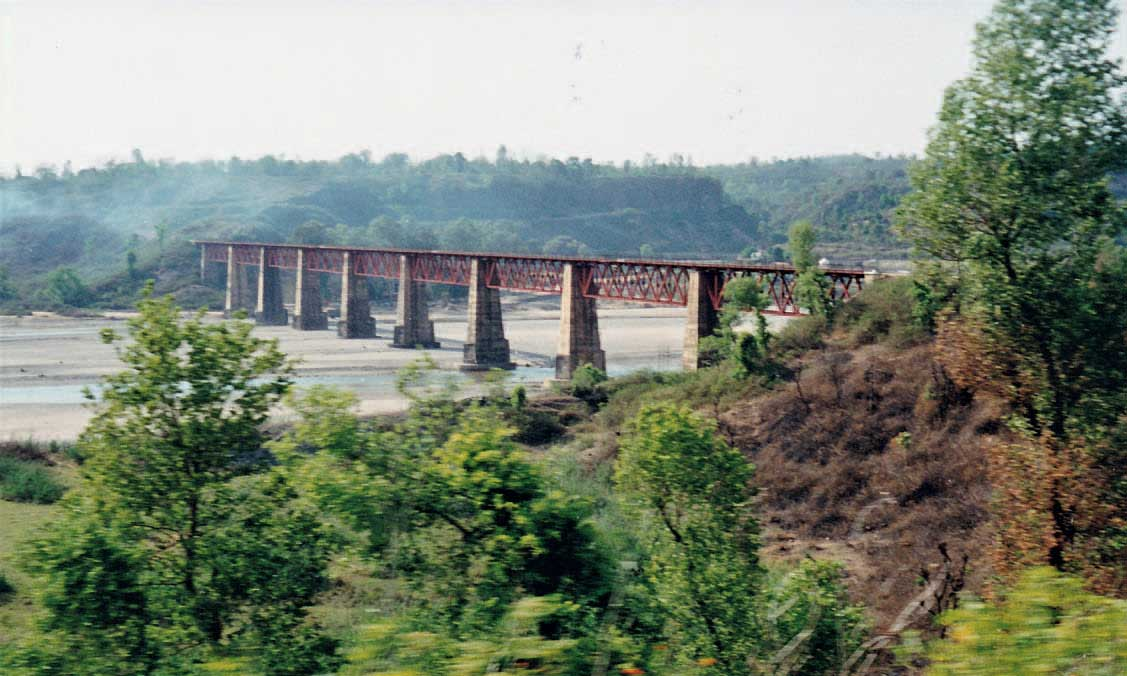
Dehar Bridge near Harsar Dehri Station

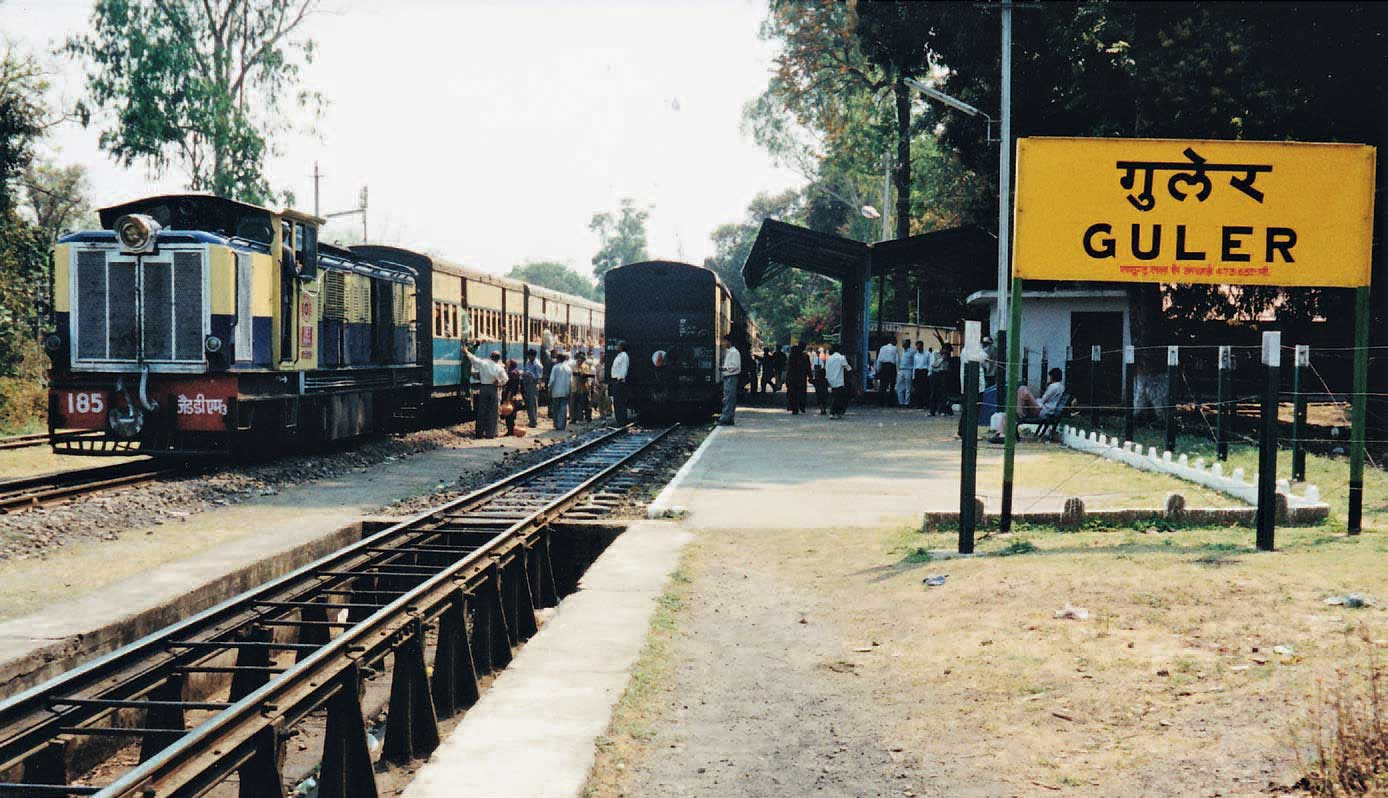
Guler Station with inspection Pit.

After leaving Talara, train descends into the Beas River and Pong Dam Basin . The line continues in South-South-Easterly direction to reach, Balle Da Pir Larath and Bharmar, the next two stops respectively. The next station is Jawanwala Shahr, which serves Jawali, a small town. It is from this stop that the line had to be diverted from its original route, which formerly headed southwards serving the erstwhile stations of Anur and Mangwal, both of which have been abandoned.

In this new route, the Line takes a Northward curve to cross the Dehar Bridge. This bridge is relatively of new construction in order for line to cross the highest water levels of tributary of Beas river. After crossing the bridge it takes southward turn continues in this direction to make call at Harsar Dehri station and Megh Rajpura Halt, the next two stops on Line. As line leaves Megh Rajpura station, it crosses the New Gaj River bridge, still maintains Southeasterly direction, and serves Nagrota Suriyan, Barial Himachal and Nandpur Bhatoli, the next three halts on the line. As the train leaves Nandpur Bhatauli, there comes the Mehla Khad Viaduct. As, the Train crosses Mahla viaduct, one can see the piers of former bridge on the old alignment, indicating that the new line is converging with its former alignment. After a short distance, the line curves around to head east and rejoins the older line. Then, the line heads to the north and makes call at Guler station which marks the end of first section of KVR line. The station is equipped with a pit on the platform road to enable examination of rolling stock.

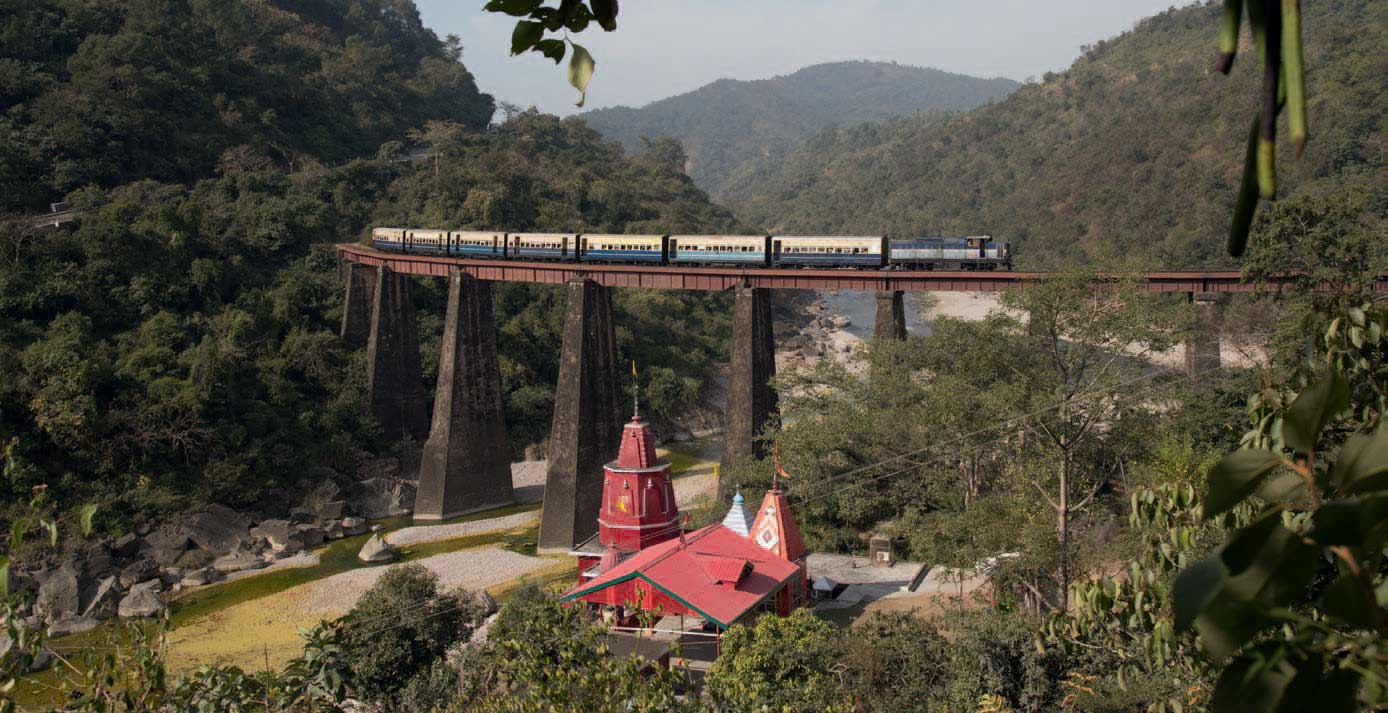
Bathu viaduct just after Jawala Mukhi Road station

=== Section B: Guler to Palampur ===
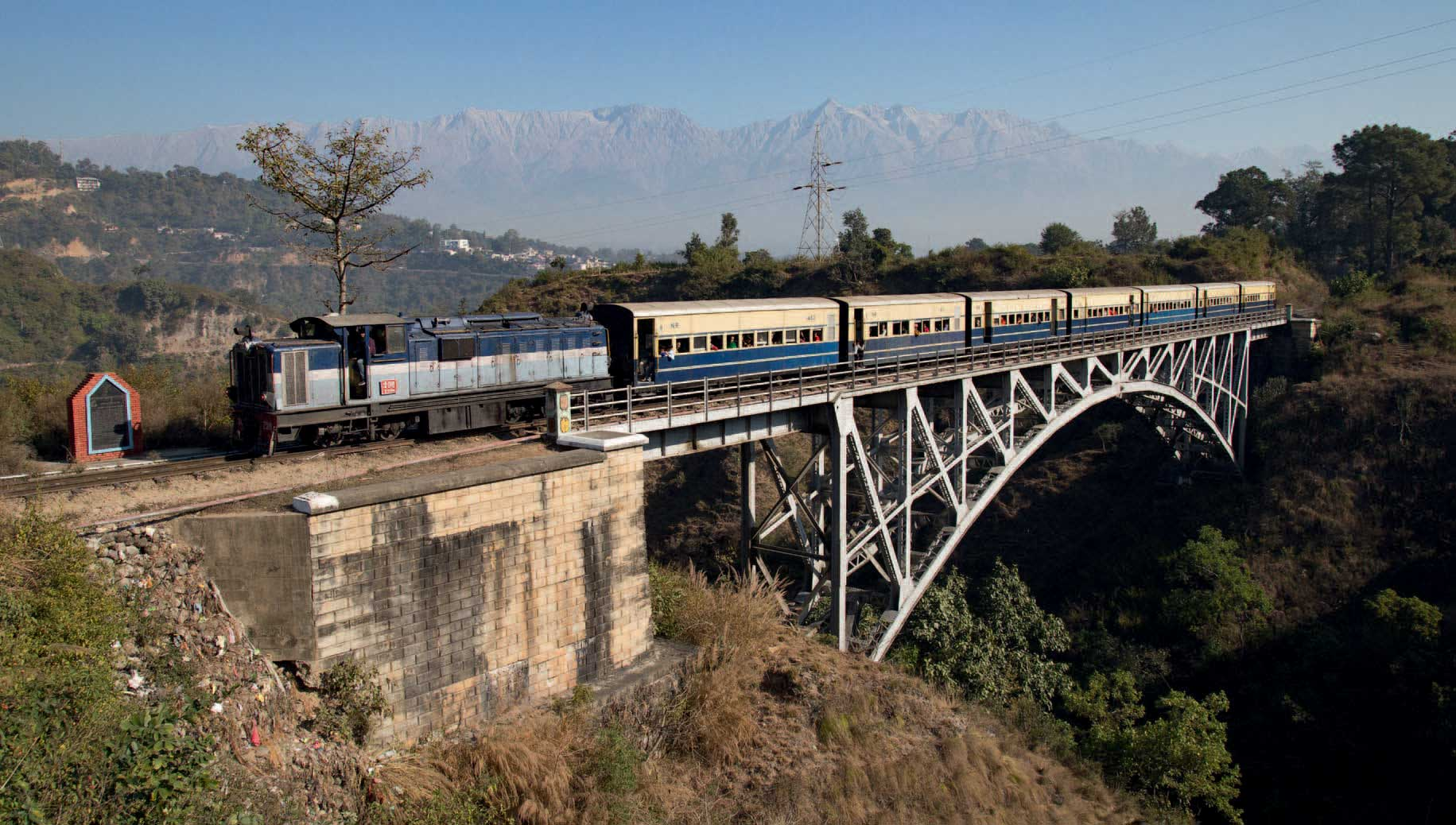
ZDM4A crossing over Reond Nullah Bridge

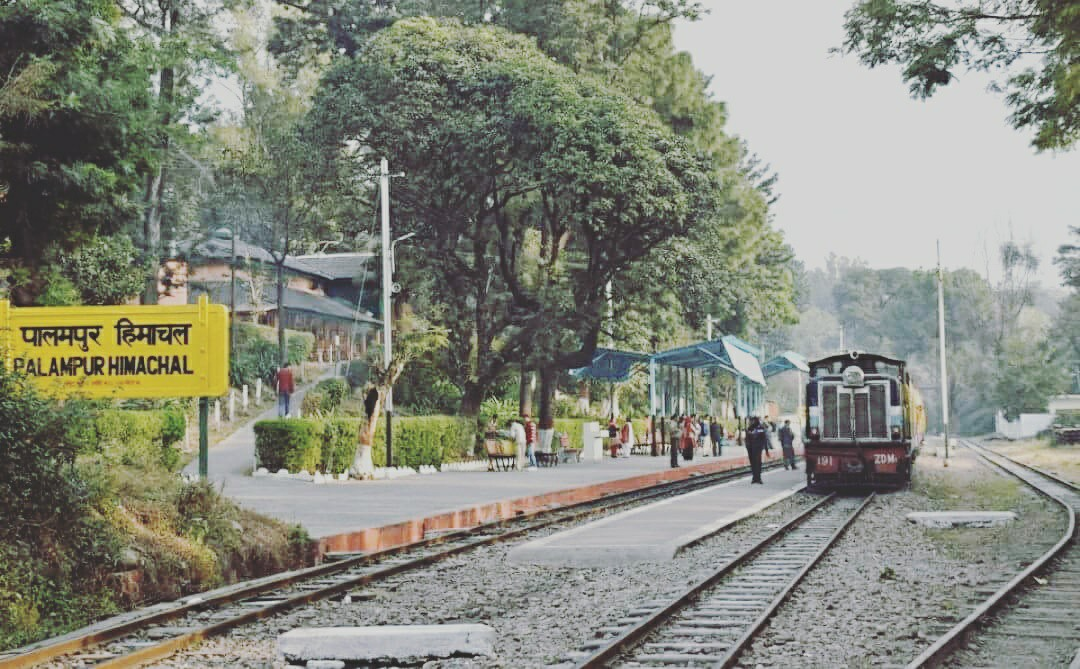
Palampur Himachal Railway station

This is approx 34 miles (55 km) long section in which the line starts following northern direction. As the Line leaves Guler, it takes a more northerly course, heading up on the western bank of Banganga river, also known as Baner Khad. Distant Snowcapped Dhauladhar mountains become visible, signifying that ranges are getting closer. As, the line leaves Lunsu Halt, the next station after Guler, the valley narrows down further, the Line crosses the gorge over Banganga Bridge. After making the halt at Tripal, the next station on the line, it makes for the next halt at Jawalamukhi Road, which is an important station as pilgrims vising Jwalaji Temple alight here.

After leaving the Jawalamukhi Road station, the terrain becomes more challenging. The line makes a graceful curve over the Bathu Bridge, passing over the Hanuman Temple in gorge below before reaching the Dhundi Tunnel, the first of the two tunnels. Then comes the Kopar Lahar station which is followed by the second and longer Daulatpur tunnel with a length of 328 m (1,075 ft). One can also get a glimpse of ancient Kangra fort on this section as train approaches Kangra Station which is on the opposite cliff on the gorge made by Baner Khad.

After leaving the Kangra station, the Line comes across the Reond Gorge, spanned over by a spectacular steel arch bridge. After this, the panoramic view of Dhauladhar mountains becomes more or less a permanent feature. As the line proceeds, it takes an easterly direction and gets called at Samloti, followed by Nagrota Stations. Nagrota was the temporary terminus of the line between 1942 and 1954, when the track to the east of Nagrota was dismantled for WW-II supplies. There are a number of sidings on this station, which are out of use at present. The Line continues Eastwards and next stations to follow are Chamunda Marg Halt, Paror and Sulah Himachal Pradesh, respectively. These stations connect the rural areas of Palampur Tehsil with KVR.

The next station is a significant one, that is Palampur Himachal, which is home to a number of offices of KVR, including Line Managers as well as railway officer's Rest House and a Heritage Bungalow. It also has a Computerised reservation counter to facilitate booking for broad Gauge Trains in other parts of the country. This marks the end of second section of KVR Line. It could be called as pilgrim section, since many temples, both ancient and modern like Jwala Ji, Brijeswhwari Mata, Chamunda Mandir, Dalai Lama Temple at Mcleodganj lie on this section.

=== Section C: Palampur to Joginder Nagar ===
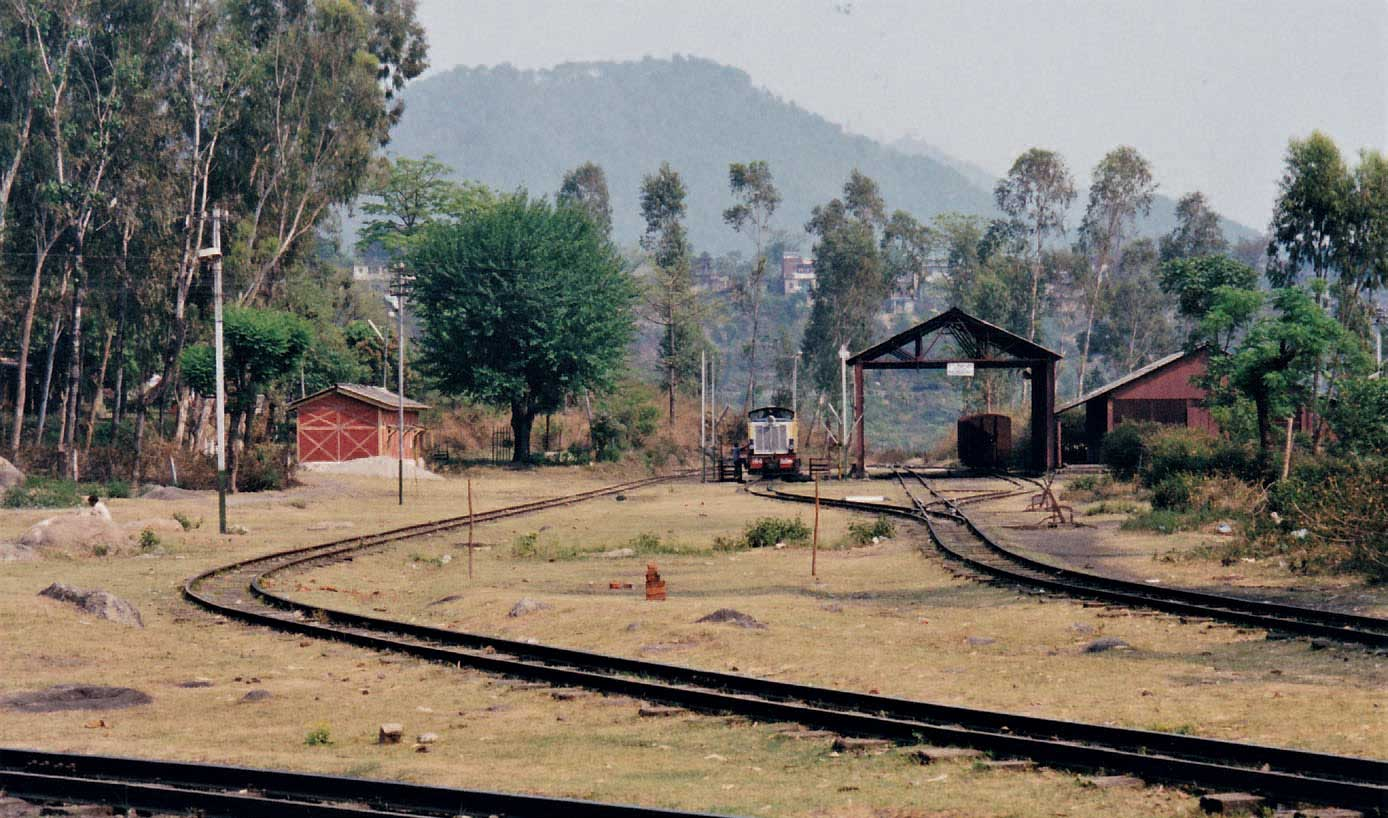
Small Loco Depot, along with Y reversing triangle at Baijnath Paprola

It is a nearly 22 miles (35 km) long section with severe gradients and most scenic landscapes on KVR Line. As the Line leaves the Palampur station, at some distance, it encounters beautiful tea gardens, for which the Palampur town is famous for. Thereafter, Line continues South-Eastwards to Patti Rajpura and Panchrukhi Halts, respectively. Panchrukhi has a beautiful chalet style Bungalow station building. Thereafter, the next halt is at Majheran Himachal, before the main station of Baijnath Paprola is called at. Most of the trains (PB-Up) terminate at Baijnath Paprola. The station has relatively big Building and also has a small covered shelter, serving as Loco Depot. It also houses the ambulance train for KVR, which consists of two coaches and a van. It also has 'Y' Reversing Triangle for shunting operations.

After the train (PBJ-UP) leaves the station, it follows steep descent and crosses Binwa Khad over a bridge. Thereafter, steep Gradient, 1 in 25 is encountered by the line before reaching the Baijnath Mandir, the next halt on the line. Here, the station overlooks the Baijnath Temple, a 13th-century temple, dedicated to lord Shiva. Then Line Heads Northwards and then curves sharply southwards, crosses a small tributary of Binwa river. Then, the Line crosses the Valley to its north side and crosses over another small tributary as it continues to climb. Now the line heads eastwards and the highest elevation of the line, i.e. Ahju Railway station (at 1290.230m amsl) is reached. Ahju station has a delightful chalet like building, reminiscent of the colonial days.
After leaving Ahju, the line descents, before being called at Chauntra Bhatehar, which is a small halt, with a small shed serving as station building. The line then meanders through a set of low-lying hills, crosses Gugli Khad, and finally reaches the terminus of passenger trains on KVR Line, i.e. Joginder Nagar. The station has two main platform to allow passing and shunting of trains. It is also equipped with a pit for inspecting the rolling stock.

== Locomotives ==
=== Steam Locomotives ===
The KVR was inaugurated with steam traction. Since NWR had many narrow gauge lines, it is highly likely that multiple types of locomotives hauled the rolling stock on KVR. Locomotives from already operational lines were borrowed for construction and initial operation of KVR. One of the earliest locomotives used was G Class 2-8-2's built by North British and 2-8-0's by Nasmyth Wilson. Lateron, S class 2-6-2 locomotives, built in 1921–23, by W. G. Bagnall, along with one Locomotive (Built 1924) from Franco-Belge were also used.
After a while, a 2-8-2 Locomotive (built 1928–1930) by Hanomag and Nasmyth Wilson became a norm on Kangra Valley Railway as ZE Class Locomotive as per Indian Railway Standards(IRS).KVR is also notable for early adoption of Rail motors. KVR experimented with this new innovation in 1932 by inducting three ZZTL class Sentinel's steam-powered four-axle rail motor design Locomotives. There were also a transfer of a 2-6-2T (Tank) and 2-6-2ST (Saddle Tank) class Locomotives respectively, in mid-1930s from Kalka Shimla Railway, but they were soon transferred to another narrow-gauge line of NWR. During late 1930s, there was still no turntable facility between Baijnath-Paprola and Joginder Nagar sections, hence operating on this section required tank locomotives to avoid tender-first running on this section, since it had severe gradients. The solution to this was ZF Class 2-6-2T type locomotives. These ZF class locomotives (built 1934–1935) by Henschel were allocated to Kalka Shimla Railway, and it was only after 1942, when KVR was stopped till Nagrota, some of these ZFs were transferred to KVR.
Post Independence, locomotives manufactured by Corpet-Louvet, Krauss-Maffei and Kawasaki were transferred from South Eastern Railway(SER) to KVR along with one loco built by Hanomag from Central Railway(CR).
In 1953, five ZF1 Class Locomotives built by Krauss-Maffei, with a modified design were introduced into KVR. Instead of Caprotti valve gear system of ZF class, the ZF1 class Locomotives were based on improved design with Walschaerts valve gear.

=== Diesel Locomotives ===
The years 1976–1977 marked the end of steam powered traction on KVR and beginning of the diesel locomotive era in KVR history.

==== ZDM3 ====
ZDM3s built in 1970-71 were the first diesel Locomotives to run on KVR. Nine ZDM3 Diesel hydro-mechanical locomotives of B-B Configuration, built at Chittaranjan Locomotive Works- West Bengal, were inducted into KVR and replaced steam powered Locomotives.

1. Engine: These ZDM3s were powered by a single MaK-6M282A(K), 6 cylinder, in line, 4 stroke, turbo charged, after cooled, diesel engine. The engine is reverse governed for proper matching with Suri Transmission to ensure optimum utilization of engine performance. It also had individual fuel injector pump for each cylinder.
2. Power: 700 HP, with maximum speed of 50 km/h (31 mph) (down) and 32 km/h (20 mph) (up).
3. Weight: 35 Tonnes.
4. Transmission: ZDM3 were fitted with Suri Hydro-Mechanical Transmission, consisting of 2 torque converters:
  1. A 'Trilok' Torque converter coupling to cover the road speed range from Zero to 70% of maximum speed and
  2. A Hydro-Mechanical converter for rest.
    The Cardan shafts and 2 axle drives- Primary and secondary, arrange the drive from transmission to wheels.
5. Cooling System: For cooling the engine, 'Behr-GmbH' hydrostatic system with thermostatic fan control for adverse climatic conditions is used.
6. Braking: ZDM3 were fitted with compressed air brakes and vacuum brake for the train.
7. Suspension: two stage suspension with - primary suspension is of coil springs and secondary of Mogi-rubber spring.

==== ZDM4 ====
From 1980 to 1982, five locomotives of later ZDM4 Class, were inducted. The engine specifications remained same as of ZDM 3, except that weight of ZDM4 had increased to 39 Tonnes. ZDM4 originally had 1-B-B-1 bogies, but later reverted into B-B configuration because extra axle meant more wheelslips, particularly in severe gradients. Hence these locos were reverted to ZDM 3 classification.

==== ZDM4A ====
In later 1980s, the ZDM3s were partially replaced by some ZDM4A engines.

1. Engine: These ZDM3s were powered by a CLW built, single MaK-6M282A(K), 6 cylinder, in line, 4 stroke, Super Charged, after cooled, diesel engine. The engine is reverse governed for proper matching with Voith Transmission. It also had individual fuel injector pump for each cylinder. Super Charger was of 'Brown-Boveri' HDC VTR 250
2. Power: 700 HP at 900 rpm, with maximum speed of 50 km/h (31 mph).
3. Weight: 39 Tonnes.
4. Transmission: Transmission was of 'Voith' make, L4R2U2 type, which is hydraulically reversible and was introduced first time on the Indian Railways. The power transmission between engine and transmission and, then between transmission and axle drives is through cardan shafts.
5. Cooling System: For cooling the engine, Behr-GmbH hydrostatic system with thermostatic fan control for adverse climatic conditions is used.
6. Braking: ZDM3 were fitted with compressed air and Hand brakes and vacuum brake for the train.
7. Suspension: two stage suspension with – primary suspension is of coil springs and – secondary is of Mogi-rubber spring.

These ZDM4As were initially of 1-B-B-1 bogie configuration, but later their pony axles were removed in order for better weight distribution on lightly laid lines. Thus ZDM4A was reconfigured back to B-B bogie type.

==== ZDM3 ====
More recently, a new fleet of improved ZDM3s, built by Central Railway's(CR) Parel Works- Mumbai have been introduced on KVR. Technical features include

1. Engine: Cummins VTA-28L-G5 - a 12 Cylinder, inline, and aftercooled engine, turbocharged with two Holset turbochargers mounted at top of engine which provide more power, improved fuel economy, altitude compensation, and lower smoke.
2. Power: 650 HP at 1500 RPM
3. Cooling System: On demand Cooling System (ODCD) retrofitted by Central Railway's (CR) Parel Works- Mumbai.
4. Braking: Air Brakes, similar to Broad Gauge Locos, thereby improving braking. Hand Brakes provided at both cabs on the locomotive.

Other significant new features are:-

1. Safety features- Such as automatic Emergency Braking and Vigilance Control Device.
2. Dual Cabin on either side of Locomotive to provide good visibility of track ahead and will ease the shunting of trains.
3. Electronic screen which will display the speed and other performance parameters of locomotive
4. 'Cold Start' enabled Locomotive for enabling their working in severe winter conditions in Northern India.
5. Dual Braking – which will allow air-braked rolling stock to be introduced, once the new ZDM3's arrive in enough number to replace older ZDM3 and ZDM4A stock

== Stations ==
- Pathankot:- Pathankot railway station is located in the Pathankot district in the Indian state of Punjab and serves Pathankot.
- Dalhousie Road:- The railway station is located nearby the road goes to Dalhousie road.
- Kandiwal
- Nurpur Road:- The station is located in Jassur which only a few kilometers away from Nurpur town.
- Talara
- Balleda Pir Larath
- Bharmar
- Jawanwala Shahr
- Harsar Dehri
- Meghraj Pura
- Nagrota Surian:- It serves Nagrota Surian town of Himachal pradesh.
- Barial Himachal Pradesh
- Nandpur Bhatauli
- Haripur Guler
- Tripal
- Jwalamukhi Road
- Koparlahar
- Kangra:- Station serves Kangra town in Kangra district in the Indian state of Himachal Pradesh.
- Kangra Mandir
- Samloti
- Nagrota:- It serves Nagrota town of Himachal pradesh.
- Chamunda Marg
- Paror
- Sulah Himachal Pradesh
- Palampur Himachal:- Palampur Himachal station is a small railway station in Kangra district in the Indian state of Himachal Pradesh.
- Patti Rajpura
- Panchruthi
- Majhairan Himachal
- Baijnath Paprola:- Baijnath railway station is a station in Paprola, Baijnath (Kangra).
- Baijanth Mandir
- Ahju:- It serves Ahju village in Joginder Nagar subdivision in Mandi district of Himachal Pradesh.
- Chauntra Bhaterh
- Joginder Nagar:- Joginder Nagar railway station is a railway station serving Joginder Nagar town, Himachal Pradesh in India.

== See also ==
- Railway in Jammu Kashmir and Ladakh
- Geostrategic border rail lines of India
