= Tadali =

Village in Maharashtra

Tadali is a village in Chandrapur district of Nagpur Division of Maharashtra, India.

The village is served by Tadali Junction which is a railway junction station under Nagpur division of Central Railway zone of Indian Railways. It is on the New Delhi–Chennai main line with a line to Ghugus which branches off to the south-west.

Year	Male	Female	Total Population	Change	Religion (%)							
Year	Male	Female	Total Population	Change	Hindu	Muslim	Christian	Sikhs	Buddhist	Jain	Other religions and persuasions	Religion not stated
2011	2597	2345	4942	-	79.118	4.087	1.032	0.263	15.136	0.283	0.000	0.081
