= Jawalamukhi Road railway station =

Railway station in Himachal Pradesh, India

Jawalamukhi Road Railway Station

General information
- Location: NH 303, Ranital, Himachal Pradesh; India
- Coordinates: 32.0163°N 76.2269°E
- Elevation: 549 metres (1,801 ft)
- System: Indian Railways station
- Owner: Indian Railways
- Line: Kangra Valley Railway
- Platforms: 1
- Tracks: 2 (2ft narrow gauge)
- Connections: Auto stand

Construction
- Structure type: Standard (on-ground station)
- Parking: No
- Cycle facilities: No

Other information
- Status: Functioning
- Station code: JMKR
- Zone(s): Northern Railway
- Division(s): Firozpur

History
- Opened: 1903
Location

Jawalamukhi Road railway station is a small railway station in Kangra district in the Indian state of Himachal Pradesh. The station lies on Pathankot–Jogindernagar narrow-gauge railway. This railway is also called Kangra Valley Railway. Jawalamukhi Road railway station is located at an altitude of 549 metres (1,801 ft) above mean sea level. It was allotted the railway code of JMKR under the jurisdiction of Firozpur railway division. This line was planned in 1926 and commissioned in 1929.

== Major trains ==
- Pathankot–Joginder Nagar Kangra Valley Passenger
- Baijnath–Pathankot Kangra Valley Rail Passenger
- Joginder Nagar–Pathankot Kangra Valley Passenger
- Pathankot–Jawalamukhi Road Kangra Valley Passenger

== See also ==
- Palampur Himachal railway station
- Joginder Nagar railway station
- Kangra railway station
- Pathankot Junction railway station
