= Railway workshop =

Railway facility for repairing trains

Shopmen overhauling a locomotive on the Chicago and Northwestern Railroad, 1942.

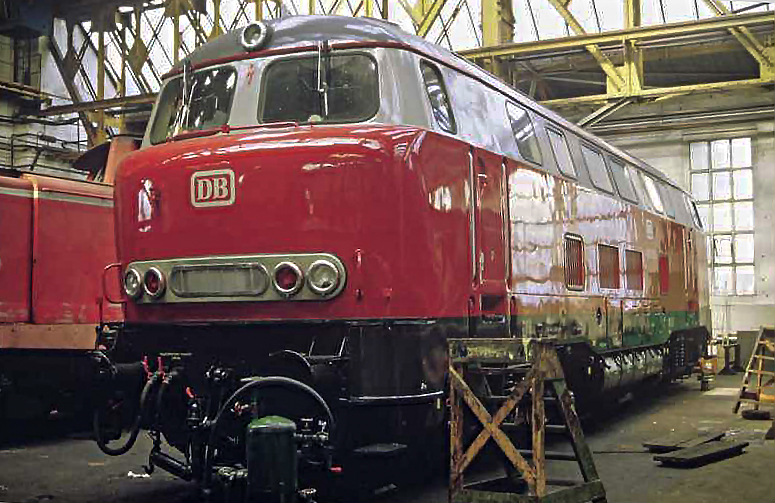
German V160 locomotive in the Ausbesserungswerk Bremen, 1984

Railway workshops are railway facilities in which rolling stock is repaired. While often colocated with engine sheds to perform routine tasks as well as major repairs, in some countries separated concepts exist with railway workshops being specialized in major repairs and general inspections.

In German-speaking countries, the generic names Werkstatt, or specifically in Austria Hauptwerkstatt, are commonly used, except for Germany, where railway workshops maintained by Deutsche Bahn are called Ausbesserungswerk or simply Werk.

== List of railway workshops ==
- Australia
  - Eveleigh Railway Workshops
  - Midland Railway Workshops
  - Newport Workshops
  - North Ipswich Railway Workshops
- Germany
  - see Ausbesserungswerk
- India
  - Jamalpur Locomotive Workshop
  - Kanchrapara Railway Workshop
  - Kharagpur Railway Workshop
  - Carriage Repair Workshop, Lower Parel, Mumbai
  - Golden Rock Railway Workshop

New Zealand

  - Addington Workshops
  - East Town Workshops
  - Hillside Engineering
  - Hutt Workshops
  - Newmarket Workshops
  - Otahuhu Workshops
  - Petone Workshops
- Portugal
  - Barreiro Workshops (CP - Manutenção Sul)
  - Campolide Workshops
  - Contumil Workshops (CP - Manutenção Porto and CP - Manutenção Comboios Históricos e Carruagens)
  - Entroncamento Workshops (CP - Manutenção Centro, SIMEF, Infraestruturas de Portugal and Medway)
  - Figueira da Foz Workshops
  - Guifões Workshops (CP - Manutenção Guifões and CP - Manutenção Metro do Porto)
  - Oeiras Workshops
  - Peso da Régua Workshops (Seasonally used by CP - Manutenção Comboios Históricos e Carruagens)
  - Poceirão Workshops (Used by Medway)
  - Santa Apolónia Workshops (CP - Manutenção Santa Apolónia and SIMEF)
  - Sernada do Vouga Workshops
  - Unidade de Manutenção de Alta Velocidade (CP - Manutenção Alta Velocidade)
  - Vila Real de Santo António Workshops (Part of CP - Manutenção Sul)

== See also ==
- Conservation and restoration of rail vehicles
- Motive power depot
