= Central Railway zone =

Zone of Indian Railways

Coordinates: 18°58′30″N 72°49′33″E

Central Railway

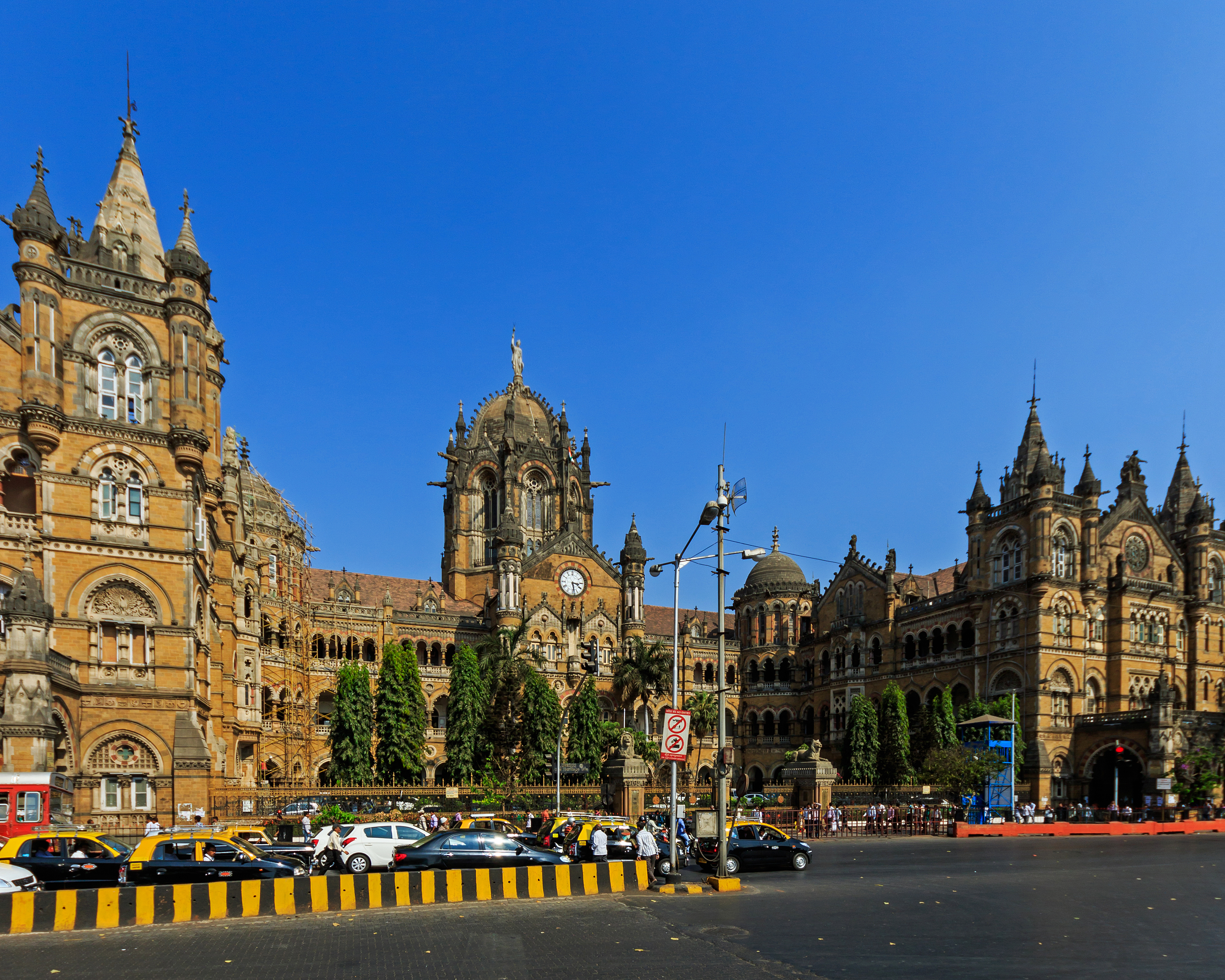
- CR's headquarters Chhatrapati Shivaji Maharaj Terminus

Overview
- Headquarters: Chhatrapati Shivaji Maharaj Terminus, Mumbai
- Key people: GM CR - Shri. R. Srivastav PCEE CR - Shri. A.K. Agarwal CEGE CR- Shri. Shailendra Singh Parihar
- Reporting mark: CR
- Dates of operation: 1951; 75 years ago–Present
- Predecessor: Great Indian Peninsula Railway; Scindia State Railway; Nizam's Guaranteed State Railway; Dholpur State Railway; Wardha Coal State Railway

Technical
- Track gauge: 1,676 mm (5 ft 6 in) broad-gauge
- Electrification: Yes (100%, all lines of Central Railway are electrified)

The Central Railway (abbreviated CR) is one of the 18 zones of Indian Railways. Its headquarters are located at Mumbai. It has the distinction of operating the first passenger railway line in India, which opened from Mumbai to Thane on 16 April 1853 (173 years ago).

== History ==
The railway zone was formed on 5 November 1951 by grouping several government-owned railways, including the Great Indian Peninsula Railway, the Scindia State Railway of the former princely state of Gwalior, Nizam State Railway, Wardha Coal State Railway and the Dholpur State Railway.

The Central Railway zone formerly included large parts of Madhya Pradesh and part of southern Uttar Pradesh, which made it the largest railway zone in India in terms of area, track mileage and staff. These areas became the new West Central Railway zone in April 2003.

The Central Railway General Manager's official residence (erstwhile GIPR agent's residence), 'Glenogle'-a Grade II-B heritage bungalow, is located on Bhausaheb Hire Marg (Mount Pleasant Road), adjacent to the Maharashtra Chief minister's official residence 'Varsha' in Malabar Hill, Mumbai.

== Routes ==
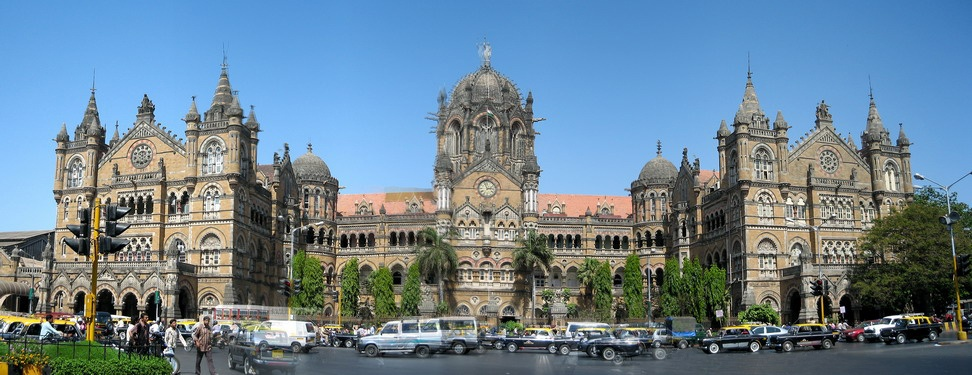
Chhatrapati Shivaji Maharaj Terminus, Mumbai One of the busiest Railway Stations in India. It is also a World Heritage Site

=== Main Lines in the Central Railway zone ===
- Howrah–Nagpur–Mumbai line (upto Nagpur Jn.)
- Mumbai–Chennai line (upto Wadi Jn.)
- Howrah–Prayagraj–Mumbai line (upto Khandwa Jn.)
- New Delhi–Chennai line (from Itarsi Jn. to Ballarshah)
- Pune–Miraj–Londa line (upto Miraj Jn.)
- Mumbai-Diva-Panvel-Roha line

One of the oldest and important railway project of central railway zone was Kalyan-Ahmednagar railway project, which was in planning stage since British regime. It was referred to as 3rd ghat project. A survey was carried out in 1973, 2000, 2006, 2014 etc, and the project was in the Railways Board pink book in 2010, but the project stalled. The alignment length of this project was 184 km, and it could have been the shortest route for Marathwada, Andhra Pradesh and Telangana. The major challenge for this project is 18.96 km long tunnel in the Malshej Ghat section. Malshej Kruti Samiti is pursuing for Kalyan-Ahmednagar railway project. The Kalyan-Murbad section, which is the first phase of this project, is already under survey stage.

=== Branch lines of the Central Railway zone ===
- Vasai Road–Roha line
- Harbour line (Mumbai Suburban Railway)
- Trans-Harbour line (Mumbai Suburban Railway)
- Port line (Mumbai Suburban Railway)
- Central line (Mumbai Suburban Railway)
- Panvel-Karjat Railway Corridor
- Pune Suburban Railway
- Daund-Manmad branch line
- Chalisgaon-Dhule branch line
- Manmad-Secunderabad branch line
- Pune-Baramati branch line
- Puntamba-Shirdi branch line
- Ahmednagar-Beed-Parli Vaijnath branch line
- Lonand-Phaltan branch line
- Miraj-Kolhapur branch line
- Miraj-Kurduwadi branch line
- Kurduwadi-Latur Road branch line
- Jalamb-Khamgaon branch line
- Badnera-Narkhed branch line
- Badnera-Amravati branch line
- Wardha-Yavatmal-Nanded branch line (operational only upto Kalamb as of June 2025)
- Amla-Chhindwara branch line (excluding Chhindwara Jn.)
- Pune-Miraj Line

=== Connections ===
Central railway zone connects to other Zones of Indian railways as at:

==== Western Railway Zone ====
Mumbai WR division

- Mahim
- Dadar
- Vasai Road
- Jalgaon Junction
- Bandra railway station

==== Konkan Railway Zone ====
- Roha

==== South Central Railway zone ====
===== Secunderabad railway division =====
- Balharshah
- Latur Road
- Wadi Jn

===== Nanded railway division =====
- Pimpal Khuti
- Akola Jn
- Khandwa Jn
- Ankai Jn (Manmad-Secunderabad)

==== South East Central Railway zone ====
===== Nagpur SEC railway division =====
- Nagpur Jn
- Chhindwara Jn

==== South Western Railway zone ====
===== Hubballi railway division =====
- Hotgi Jn - For Pune-Solapur-Vijayapura-Gadag line.
- Miraj Jn - For Miraj-Londa-Bangalore line

==== Western Central Railway zone ====
===== Bhopal division =====
- Itarsi Jn
- Khandwa Jn

=== Matheran Hill Railway ===
Constructed in 1907, the narrow-gauge Matheran Hill Railway connects Neral on the Mumbai CSMT-Chennai main line with the hill station of Matheran in the Western Ghats, east of Mumbai. Neral is linked to Mumbai's Chhatrapati Shivaji Maharaj Terminus by frequent suburban trains. Steam engines have now been replaced by diesel locomotives. The route is noted for its sharp curves.

== Divisions ==
- Mumbai CR railway division
- Solapur railway division
- Bhusawal railway division
- Pune railway division
- Nagpur CR railway division

== Organisation ==
The central railway covers a large part of the state of Maharashtra and small part of Southern Madhya Pradesh and North-Eastern Karnataka. It is organized into five divisions: Mumbai, Bhusawal, Nagpur, Solapur and Pune. The details of the network by division are as follows

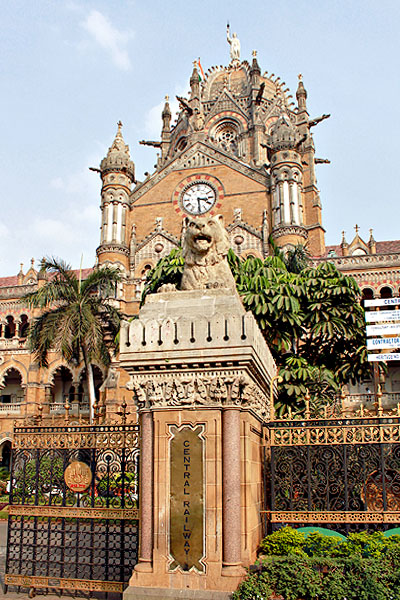
Central Railway Headquarters at CSMT.

=== Mumbai Division ===
- Mumbai CSMT-Dadar-Kurla-Thane (Central line)
  - Mumbai CSMT-Wadala Road-Kurla (Harbour line)
    - Wadala Road-Bandra-Andheri-Goregaon (Inclusive)
  - Kurla-Trombay (Goods)
  - Kurla-Vashi-Nerul-Panvel (Harbour line)
    - Thane-Turbhe-Vashi/Nerul (Trans-Harbour line)
- Thane-Diva Jn-Kalyan Jn (Central line)
  - Diva Jn-Panvel-Roha
    - Panvel-Jasai-Uran
      - Jasai-JNPT
  - Diva Jn-Vasai Road
- Kalyan Jn-Kasara-Igatpuri (Inclusive)
- Kalyan Jn-Neral Jn-Karjat-Lonavala (Inclusive)
  - Neral Jn-Matheran (narrow-gauge)
  - Karjat-Panvel
  - Karjat-Khopoli

Malshej Kriti Samiti is following for Kalyan-Ahmednagar railway project. Kalyan-Murbad section which is first phase of this project is already under survey stage.

=== Pune Division ===
- Lonavala-Pune Jn-Daund Jn
- Pune Jn-Satara-Karad-Sangli-Miraj Jn-Kolhapur
- Daund Jn -Baramati
- Phaltan - Baramati (to be completed by 2022)
- Pune Jn-Rajgurunagar-Sangamner-Sinnar-Nashik Road (Project Scrapped)
- Karad-Chiplun (scrapped)

=== Nagpur Division ===
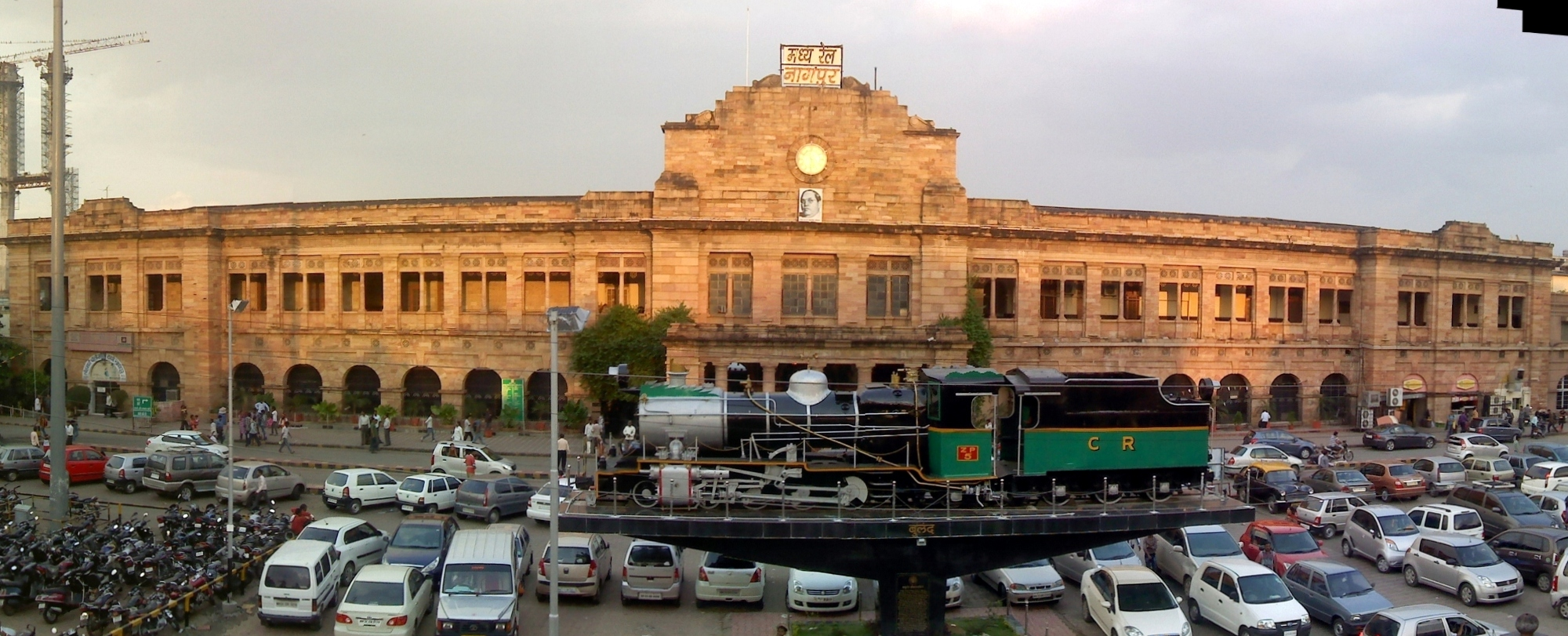
Nagpur Railway Station

- Badnera Jn (Exclude)-Pulgaon Jn-Wardha Jn-Butibori Jn-Nagpur Jn
  - Pulgaon Jn-Arvi (narrow-gauge)
  - Butobori Jn-Umrer
- Sewagram-Majri Jn-Tadali Jn-Chandrapur-Balharshah Jn (include)
  - Wardha Jn-Chitoda Jn (on Sewagram-Balharshah line)
    - Majri Jn-Wani Jn-Pimpalkutti
  - Wani Jn-Rajur
  - Tadali Jn-Ghugus
  - Balharshah Jn-Chanda Fort
- Nagpur-Amla Jn-Itarsi Jn (exclude)
  - Amla Junction-Chhindwara(exclude)

=== Solapur Division ===
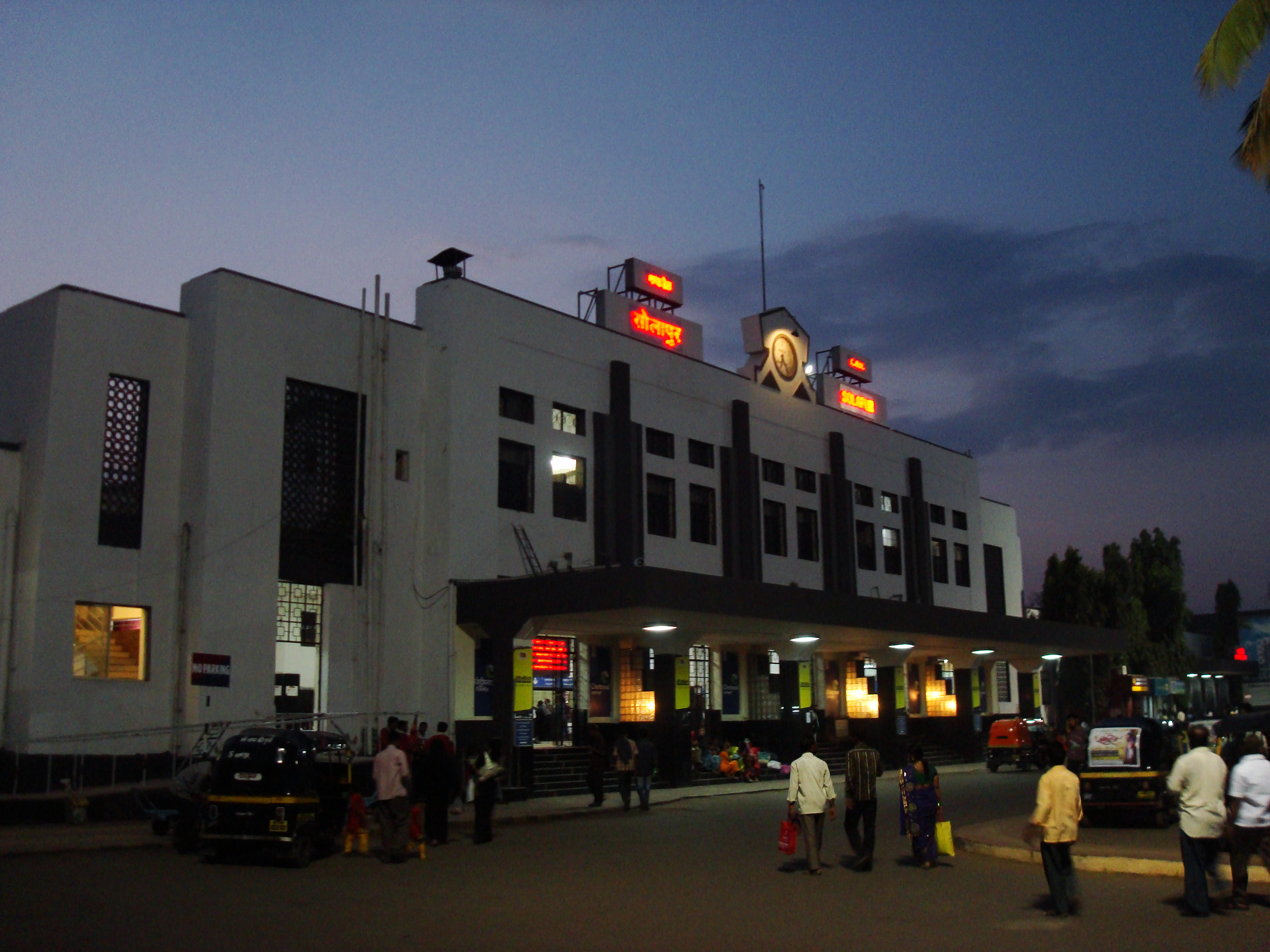
Solapur railway station

- Manmad (exclude)-Ahmednagar-Daund Jn
- Daund Jn-Solapur
- Miraj Jn (exclude)-Pandharpur-Kurudwadi Jn-Barshi-Latur-Latur Road (excluding)
- SolapurJn-Hotgi Jn-Gulbarga-Wadi Jn (Include)

=== Bhusawal Division ===
- Manmad-Indore (project scrapped)
- Bhusawal-Badnera-Nagpur (exclude)
- Bhusawal-Khandwa-Itarsi (exclude)
- Jalgaon-Nandurbar-Udhna (exclude)
- Chalisgaon-Dhule
- Khamgaon - Jalamb
- Pachora-Jamner
- Manmad-Aurangabad (exclude)
- Manmad-Daund (exclude)
- Mandmad-Nasik-Igatpuri (exclude)
- Akola-Nanded (exclude)

The number of stations category-wise under these five railway divisions under the Central Railway Zones are as follows (as of 2008) : A-1 : 7, A : 20, B : 10, C : 80, D : 45, E : 221, F : 93, Total : 476

== Ongoing projects ==
=== New lines ===
- Solapur Jn -Tuljapur- Osmanabad. (New Rail Line survey completed but work yet to start)
- Nanded - Yavatmal - Wardha. (Work under process)
- Ashti-Parli Vaijnath line (work under progress). Ahmednagar-Ashti 67 km completed. (Project :- Ahmedanagar- Beed - Parli)
- Phaltan - Baramati (Work under progress, to be operational by 2027-2028)
- Kolhapur-Vaibhavwadi line (survey under progress)
- Aurangabad-Shani shingnapur-Ahmednagar line (survey completed, but work yet to start)
- Khamgaon-Jalna (survey completed, but work yet to start)
- Latur-Latur Road-Ahmedpur-Nanded (survey completed, but work yet to start)
- Latur Road-Jalkot-Mukhed-Biloli-Bodhan (announced but not yet taken up)
- Latur-Ausa-Nilanga-Omerga-Aland-Gulbarga (survey under progress)

=== Doubling ===
- Bhigvan-Gulbarga (Doubling completed)
- Pune-Miraj-Londa-Hubli (Doubling completed and operational)
- Panvel-Karjat
- Karjat-Khopoli

=== Tripling ===
- Kalyan-Kasara
- Kalyan-Karjat
- Sewagram Jn-Balharshah Jn
- Pune -Hadapsar (Commissioned October 2026)

=== Quadrupling ===
- Nagpur-Wardha
- Manmad-Igatpuri

=== Hexupling ===
- Mumbai CSMT-Kalyan

== Trains ==
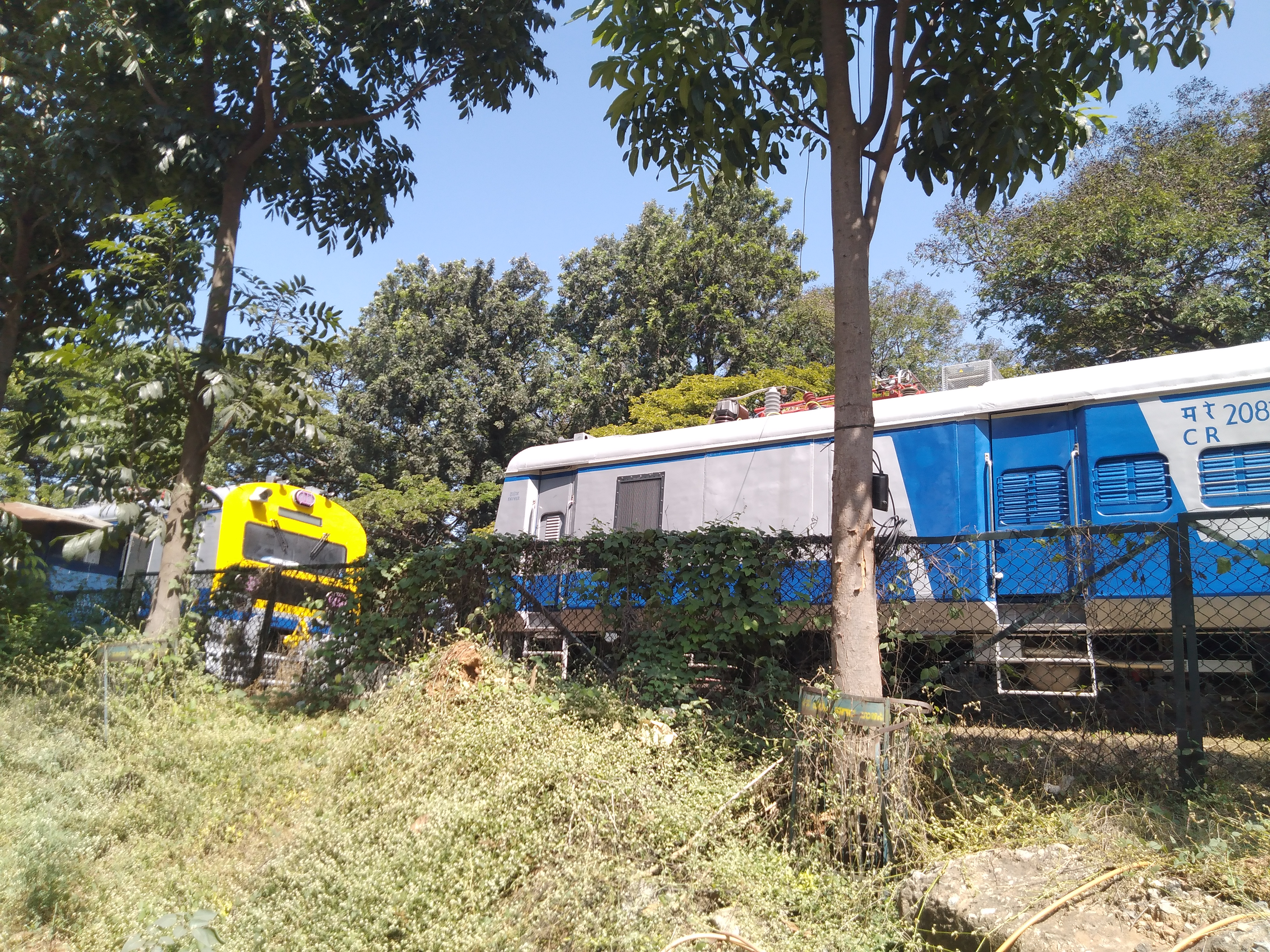
CR MEMU Rakes built by BEML, Bangalore

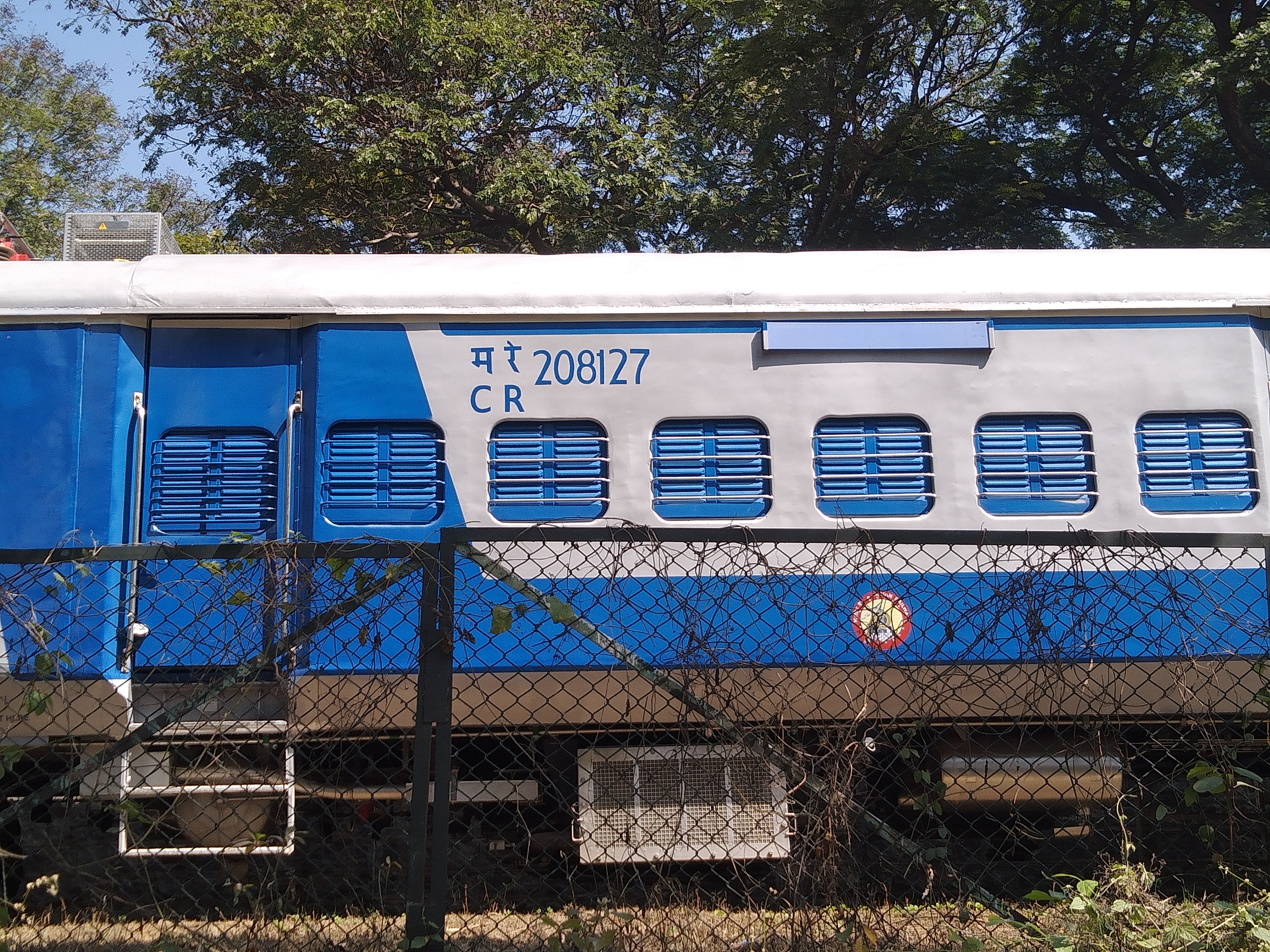
CR MEMU Rakes parked alongside Suranjan Das Road

Some of the major trains operated by Central Railway zone are as follows:

Number	Train Name	Starting Station	Terminating Station
22221/22222	Mumbai CSMT–Hazrat Nizamuddin CR Rajdhani Express	Mumbai CSMT	Hazrat Nizamuddin.
12123/12124	Deccan Queen	Mumbai CSMT	Pune Jn.
12137/12138	Punjab Mail	Mumbai CSMT	Firozpur Cantt.
12859/12860	Gitanjali Express	Mumbai CSMT	Howrah Jn.
12071/12072	Mumbai CSMT-Jalna Jan Shatabdi Express	Mumbai CSMT	Jalna.
12321/12322	Howrah–Mumbai CSMT Mail (via Gaya)	Mumbai CSMT	Howrah Jn.
12809/12810	Howrah–Mumbai CSMT Mail (via Nagpur)	Mumbai CSMT	Howrah Jn.
11035/11036	Sharavati Express	Dadar	Mysuru Jn.
11085/11086	Lokmanya Tilak Terminus - Madgaon AC Double Decker Express	Kurla LTT	Madgaon Jn.
12289/12290	Chhatrapati Shivaji Maharaj Terminus - Nagpur Duronto Express	Mumbai CSMT	Nagpur.
22107/221078	Latur Express	Mumbai CSMT	Latur.
11301/11302	Udyan Express	Mumbai CSMT	KSR Bengaluru City
12025/12026	Pune - Secunderabad Shatabdi Express	Pune	Secunderabad Jn.
12051/12052	Mumbai CSMT–Madgaon Jan Shatabdi Express	CSMT	Madgaon Jn.
12113/12114	Pune–Nagpur Garib Rath Express	Pune	Nagpur Jn.
12115/12116	Siddheshwar Express	Mumbai CSMT	Solapur
22119/22120	Mumbai CSMT - Madgaon Tejas Express	Mumbai CSMT	Madgaon
12105/12106	Vidarbha Express	Mumbai CSMT	Gondia Jn.
11039/11040	Maharashtra Express	Kolhapur SCSMT	Gondia Jn.
12109/12110	Panchvati Express	Mumbai CSMT	Manmad
11061/11062	Pawan Express	Lokmanya Tilak Terminus	Jaynagar.
11023/11024	Sahyadri Express	Mumbai CSMT	Kolhapur SCSMT
11027/11028	Mumbai Chennai Mail	Mumbai CSMT	Chennai Central
12261/12262	Mumbai CSMT–Howrah Duronto Express	Mumbai CSMT	Howrah
11019/11020	Konark Express	Mumbai CSMT	Bhubaneswar New
22159/22160	Mumbai CSMT–Chennai Express	Mumbai CSMT	Pulatachi Thalaivar MG Ramchandran Chennai Central
11021/11022	Dadar- Tirunelveli Chalukya Express	Dadar Central (DR)	Tirunelveli Junction
11005/11006	Dadar–Puducherry Chalukya Express	Dadar Central (DR)	Puducherry Junction
11029/11030	Koyna Express	Mumbai CSMT	SCSMT Kolhapur

== Loco sheds ==
=== Electric Loco Sheds ===
- Electric Loco Shed, Ajni
- Electric Loco Shed, Kalyan
- Electric Loco Shed, Bhusawal

=== Diesel Loco Sheds ===
- Diesel Loco Shed, Pune
- Diesel Loco Shed, Kalyan
- Diesel Loco Shed, Kurla
- Electric Loco Shed, Daund

== Locomotive count under Central Railways Loco Shed ==
Electric Locomotives as of 07/11/2026
Base Shed	WAP4	WAP5AB	WAP7	WAP7AB	WAG5TAOCHI	WAG7	WAG7M	WAG9H	WAG-12B	WCAM2	WCAM3	WCAG1	WCM6	Total
AQE			73					239						312
DNDE								50						50
KYNE		8	85	4		68	45	2		4	6	12	2	236
PADX			68	2				38						108
BSLL	71				38	25		170						304
NEDA									250					250
Total	71	8	226	6	38	93	45	499	250	4	6	12	2	1260

== See also ==
- All India Station Masters' Association (AISMA)
- Zones and divisions of Indian Railways
- Mumbai Suburban Railway
- Indian Railways
- Carriage Repair Workshop, Lower Parel, Mumbai
- Konkan Railway Corporation
