= Carriage Repair Workshop, Lower Parel, Mumbai =

Coordinates: 19.003516°N 72.832832°E

Carriage Repair Workshop based at Lower Parel in the city of Mumbai, India is a premier Broad gauge coaching workshop of Central Railway, India. The workshop undertakes the periodic overhauling of passenger main line coaches. It also manufactures wheel sets for the workshop as well as various Locomotives in Mumbai.

== History ==
The workshop was set up by the erstwhile Bombay Baroda and Central India Railway as a centralised workshop for the manufacture and repair of all types of rolling stock - locomotives, carriages and wagons. The workshop commenced operations in 1868 after abandonment of the original works at Amroli. The Workshop was involved in the repair of the railway company's rolling stock and in building every type of carriages and wagons. Locomotives manufactured in England were assembled and fitted up in the workshop.

In 1886, the Workshop manufactured a set of two Royal Saloons for Sayajirao Gaekwad III, with the first saloon consisting of the living room, bedroom, visitor's room, bathroom with bathtubs and the second saloon consisting of the attendant's quarters. The second saloon is preserved at the National Rail Museum.

Later, as the repair activities were expanded with progressive increases in the holding of locomotives, coaches and wagons, a separate wagon repair workshop was set up at Mahalaxmi in 1910 as an extension to this workshop under its administrative setup.

With further expansion of repair activities, a separate locomotive workshop was constructed at Dahod in the year 1928, thereby transferring all repair activities relating to locomotive repairs to Dahod workshop. Lower Parel and Mahalaxmi workshops were, therefore, left with carrying out repairs to coaching and wagon stock. In the year 1959, a separate wagon repair workshop was built at Kota. Repairs to the suburban electrical multiple stocks was progressively centralised at Mahalaxmi shop.

New Bogie Repair and Lifting Shed and NTL (New Trial Line) Shed were constructed in Lower Parel Shop in 1984. New RAC Shed was constructed in 1993. The oldest structure still available in the workshop premises is the Senior Railway Institute which has a foundation stone dated 1882. The Administrative Building was constructed in the year 1900. Another heritage value item still preserved is the cast iron bell manufactured in the year 1890 and a wall clock manufactured by Gillette & Co., England in the year 1889. Both of them are still in working condition.

== Main Activity ==
Presently, the workshop undertakes the periodic overhauling of two main types of coaches. The first category of the coach is known as the ICF design coaches. The second category of the coach is the LHB design coaches.

In a year, 1500 coaches are POHed at Lower Parel Workshop. They include the General Class coaches, Sleeper class, Three tier, Two tier and the First class Air Conditioned coaches. It also undertakes the POH of Milk Tankers of the NDDB ( National Dairy Development Board). The average outturn of the coaches has increased from 1,463 in the year 1990 to 1,530 in the year 2008. Out of 1,530 coaches, 330 coaches are air conditioned coaches. The air-conditioned coach outturn has increased from 192 in the year 1990 to 330 in the year 2008. The average POH cycle for the coach is 25 days.

It also manufactures wheel sets for the workshop divisions as well as the EMU workshop at Mahalaxmi. The average supply of wheel sets is 12000 wheel sets per year out of which 120 wheel sets are sent to the divisions and another 120 wheel sets to EMU workshop

== Infrastructure ==
The workshop is spread in an area of 14 hectares with a covered area of 5500 sq. m. The rail track length in the workshop is 5.5 km. Water requirement is 475 Kiloliters per day. Compressed air requirement is around 3000CFM per day.

An amount of Rs. 1.50 Billion is the money annually spent on various activities. Labor constitutes 30% of the budget grant and stores constitute another 30%, the rest is inter Railway debits. The average cost is around Rs. Five Lakh per coach. The expenditure on each PCV (Passenger Coaching Vehicle) is Rs. 5.14 Lakhs, Other Commercial vehicles is Rs 4.26 Lakhs & LHB coaches is Rs. 5.72 Lakhs.

The workshop is headed by the Chief Workshop manager. There are five departments dealing with various activities such as Mechanical, Electrical, Materials Management, Finance & Accounts, HRD, Audit & Security. It has a total employee strength of 5,110.

== See also ==
- Western Railway (India)
