= Majri =

Village in Maharashtra

- Village
- Location in Rajasthan, India Majri (India)
- Coordinates: 28.080498°N 76.792686°E
- Country: India
- State: Rajasthan
- District: Alwar
- Tehsil: Kotkasim

Population (2011)
  - Total: 680

Languages
  - Official: Hindi हिंदी
  - Spoken: Ahirwati अहीरवाटी
- PIN: 301707
- Telephone code: 01493
- Vehicle registration: RJ-40
- Lok Sabha constituency: Alwar
- Vidhan Sabha constituency: Kishangarh

Majri is a small size village in Kotkasim tehsil Alwar District in the state of Rajasthan, It is located around 75 km south of Delhi, 75 km north of Alwar, and about 200 km north of Jaipur, the capital of Rajasthan. MAJRI is part of Greater Bhiwadi and National Capital Region (NCR). India.

Majri is a part of the Ahirwal region and about 80 percent of the total population are Yadav. Most of the Yadavs belong to the gotra (clan) of the khaliyav and lamba.

== Population ==
The Majri village has population of 680 of which 358 are males while 322 are females with total 127 families residing as per Population Census 2011.

In Majri village population of children with age 0-6 is 77 which makes up 11.32% of total population of village. Average Sex Ratio of Majri village is 899 which is lower than Rajasthan state average of 928. Child Sex Ratio for the Majri as per census is 711, lower than Rajasthan average of 888. Schedule Caste (SC) constitutes 13.97% of total population in Majri village. Schedule tribes (ST) constitutes 8.67% of total population in Majri village.

== Education ==
- Government Upper Primary School Majri Alwar, Rajasthan

== Transport ==
=== Railway ===
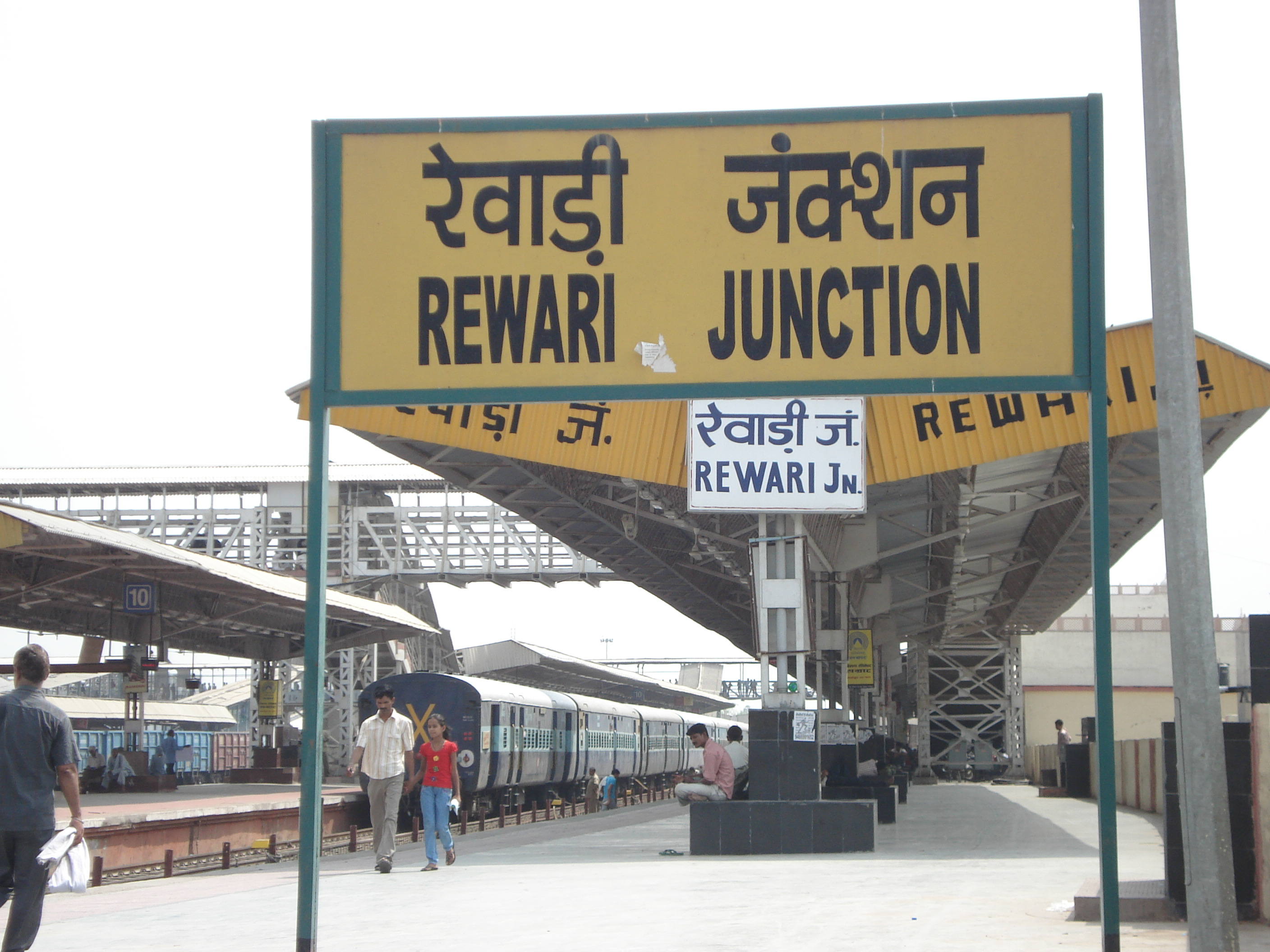
Rewari Railway Station
