= Pimpalkutti =

Village in Maharashtra

Pimpalkutti is a village and a railway station in Yavatmal district of Maharashtra State in India. This is the last village and last railway station in Maharashtra on NH7 and Nagpur – Adilabad line respectively.
