= Ghugus =

- Census town
- Location in Maharashtra, India
- Coordinates: 19.93°N 79.13°E
- Country: India
- State: Maharashtra
- District: Chandrapur
- Named for: Black Gold (Coal)
- Elevation: 189 m (620 ft)

Population (2001)
  - Total: 29,945

Languages
  - Official: Marathi
- Time zone: UTC+5:30 (IST)

Ghugus (also Ghuggus) is a census town in Chandrapur district in the Indian state of Maharashtra.

== Geography ==
Ghugus is located at 19.93°N 79.13°E. It has an average elevation of 189 metres (620 feet). Wardha river is flowing by the side of the village which make it prosperous in minerals, particularly coal.

== Demographics ==
As of 2011 India census, Ghugus had a population of 32,654. Males constitute 52% of the population (16980) and females 48% (15674). Ghugus has an average literacy rate of 73%, higher than the national average of 59.5%: male literacy is 79%, and female literacy is 67%. In Ghugus, 13% of the population is under 6 years of age. Gandhi chowk, serves as the hub town, and will sometimes host meetings and rallies.

Year	Male	Female	Total Population	Change	Religion (%)							
Year	Male	Female	Total Population	Change	Hindu	Muslim	Christian	Sikhs	Buddhist	Jain	Other religions and persuasions	Religion not stated
2001	15658	14287	29945	-	66.565	7.357	4.291	0.451	20.935	0.167	0.147	0.087
2011	16980	15674	32654	0.090	66.822	9.745	3.170	0.322	19.704	0.095	0.086	0.058

== Education ==
Ghugus town has primary schools up-till 12th grade. It takes the privilege of having the schools of C.B.S.E, I.C.S.E and Maharashtra Board. The oldest and most popular of the school is Mount Carmel Convent (C.B.S.E), Vianney Vidya Mandir(I.C.S.E), Janata Vidhyalaya and Kirti Convent. Most recent and fully equipped school is Sharon Public School. Ghugus is a coal mining village in Chandrapur tahsil, about 20.92 km. (13 miles) from Chandrapur connected by a branch railway line shooting off at Tadali from the Chandrapur-Wardha main line of the Central Railway. Here two collieries are work yielding a good variety of non-coking coal. Besides Ghugus proper whose population was 1,767 in 1961, two separate habitations have grown round the collieries with populations of 1,862 and 1,660, respectively. All three places have a post office, a medical practitioner, and a primary school, except Ghugus proper, which only has a middle school. The colliery areas have a rest house each and at the first of these a weekly bazar is held on Sundays.

There are three caves in the rocky ground near Ghugus, one of which contains an idol of Bhairavdev with broken legs. The local tradition regarding this is that in former times while thefts and dacoities used to take place elsewhere, none could be committed at Ghugus, and consequently the thieves and dacoits cut off the legs of the idol. In front of this idol there is a stone standing erect called Bahi or the sleeve of Sita. Not far off there is another small cave containing a stone, which the people say is the mother of Bhairavdeva. The idol of Bhairavdeva was said to be increasing in height. Ghugus is now a coal mining town. The first colliery known as Mayo Colliery was opened in 1870 by Lord Mayo. It ceased working the very next year.

== Industries & Shops ==
Ghugus has coal industries "WCL" and a cement company "ACC Limited". There is a Steel Plant and many coal washers, for this reason Ghugus is the most polluted town in maharashtra. Lloyds Metals and Engineers Limited is a sponge iron plant in ghugus.

WCL Western Coalfields Limited, a subsidiary of Coal India Limited.

ACC Limited Associated Cement Companies Limited.

Shops- Ghugus population is increasing day by day the people of ghugus need more facility. Ghugus main market area is in the middle of the town known for basti. On every Sunday a weekly bazar (market) is organized to meet the needs of the people.
