= Pathankot Junction railway station =

Railway station in Punjab, India

Pathankot Junction
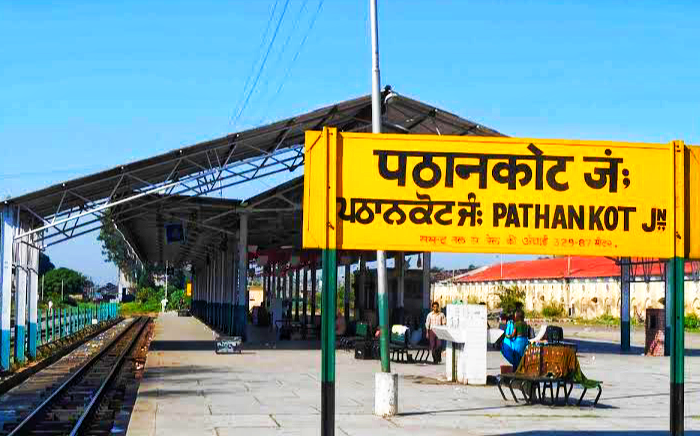
- Pathankot Junction Railway Station

General information
- Location: Pathankot, Punjab; India
- Coordinates: 32°16′18″N 75°38′38″E
- Elevation: 331 metres (1,086 ft)
- System: Light rail & Commuter rail station
- Owner: Government of India (Under Ministry of Railways)
- Operator: Indian Railways
- Lines: Amritsar–Jammu main line Jalandhar–Jammu line Kangra Valley Railway; Amritsar–Pathankot line
- Platforms: 4 (3 broad gauge + 1 narrow gauge)
- Tracks: 5 ft 6 in (1,676 mm) broad gauge

Construction
- Structure type: At grade
- Parking: Yes
- Cycle facilities: No
- Accessible: Available

Other information
- Status: Functioning
- Station code: PTK
- Zone(s): Northern Railway
- Division(s): Jammu

History
- Opened: 1884; 142 years ago

Services
Preceding station	Indian Railways	Following station
Pathankot Cantonment towards ?	Northern Railway zone Jalandhar–Jammu line	Bharoli towards ?
Terminus	Northern Railway zone Amritsar–Pathankot line	Bharoli towards ?
Terminus	Northern Railway zone Kangra Valley Railway	Jawalamukhi Road towards ?
Location
- Location within Punjab

Pathankot Junction Railway Station (station code: PTK) is a located in Pathankot district in the Indian state of Punjab and serves Pathankot.

== The railway station ==
Pathankot railway station is at an elevation of 331 metres (1,086 ft) and was assigned the code – PTK.

Here is a short description of the station by Ian Manning: "Pathankot, being the railhead for Kashmir and several other places (a branch has been inching into Kashmir for some time, but so far it hasn't made much difference) is a dusty trucking and military town, booming and rough. Its station grew by accumulation in length rather than in breadth, with some rather confused bay platforms at the Amritsar end. The contrasting tidy bay and loop at the far end were the passenger terminus of the Kangra Valley Railway, a 2 ft 6 in (762 mm) line which penetrated into the foothills of the Himalayas."

== History ==
The 107 km (66 mi)-long 5 ft 6 in (1,676 mm) broad gauge Amritsar–Pathankot line was opened in 1884.

The 164 km (101.9 mi)-long 762 mm (2 ft 6 in)-wide narrow-gauge Kangra Valley Railway from Pathankot to Joginder Nagar was commissioned in 1929.

The line from Jalandhar City to Mukerian was constructed in 1915. The Mukerian–Pathankot line was built in 1952, The construction of the Pathankot–Jammu Tawi line was initiated in 1965, after the Indo-Pakistani War of 1965, and opened in 1971.

== Electrification ==
Electrification work of the Jalandhar–Jammu line is completed as of May 2015 and now functioning.
