= Nagpur CR railway division =

Railway division of India

Nagpur CR railway division is one of the five railway divisions under the jurisdiction of Central Railway zone of the Indian Railways. This railway division was formed in 1867 and its headquarter is located at Nagpur in the state of Maharashtra of India. It covers an East part of the state of Maharashtra and small part of Southern Madhya Pradesh.

Bhusawal railway division, Solapur railway division, Mumbai CR railway division, and Pune railway division are the other railway divisions under CR Zone headquartered at Mumbai CST.

== List of railway stations and towns ==
The list includes the stations under the Nagpur CR division and their station category.

Category of station	No. of stations	Names of stations
A-1 Category	1	Nagpur Junction
A Category	4	Wardha Junction, Chandrapur, Balharshah Junction, Betul, Amravati, Badnera Junction
B Category	2	Sewagram Junction, Dhamangaon
C Category (Suburban station)	3	Ajni
D Category. |Majri jn |	15	HGT, MTY, AQ, Junnardeo, Parasia, WRR, Narkher, Katol, CND, BUX, MJRI, Amla Junction, GDYA, PLO, PAR
E Category	52	Wani, Bhugaon, Hirdagarh, Bordhai, Sindi, Butibori, Babupeth, Palachaurai, Godhani, Navegaon, Iklehra, Taku, Jambara, Kalmeshwar, Tuljapur, Teegaon, Barbatpur, Kirathgarh, Dhodramohar, Talni, Malkhed, Kayar, Nagri, Jaulkheda, Dahegaon, Sonegaon, Lingti, Kalaakhar, Seloo Road, Timtala, Chikni Road, Kalambha, Khapri, Chichonda, Kohli, Tadali, Borkhedi, Gumgaon, Wagholi, Kaotha, Sonkhamb, Metpanjra, Maramjhiri, Barsali, Pimpalkhuti, Bharatwada, Dharakhoh, Saheli, Arvi, Pusla, Warud Orange city, Morshi.
F Category; Halt Station	18	Gondwana Visapur, Warud, Tinkheda, Darimeta, Ghudankhapa, Hatnapur, Lalawadi, Malkapur, Barchi Road, Barelipar, Markadhana, Gangiwara, Mowad, Benoda, Hiwarkhed, Pala, Astegaon, Kolvihir
Total	92	-

Stations closed for Passengers - 23 numbers Kesla, Polapathar, Magardoh, Chard cabin, Chitoda jn, Yenor, Chotipadoli, Vivekand nagar, Dipori, Sorta, Virur, Rohna -1, Rohna-2, Dhanori, Pargothan, Khubgaon, Pachegaon, Arvi, Majri khadan, Mukutban, Umrer, Rajur, Ghugus

== Routes ==
- Badnera Jn(Exclude)- Pulgaon Jn - Wardha Jn - Butibori Jn-Nagpur Jn
  - Pulgaon Jn-Arvi (Narrow Gauge)
  - Butobori Jn - Umrer
- Wardha Jn- Majri Jn - Tadali Jn - Chandrapur-Balharshah Jn(Include)
    - Majri Jn - Wani Jn - pimpalkutti
  - Wani Jn - rajur
  - Tadali Jn - Ghugus
  - Balharshah Jn - Chanda Fort
- Nagpur-Amla Jn-Itarsi Jn(exclude)
  - Amla -Chhindwara(exclude)
