= Bhopal–Nagpur section =

Railway route in India

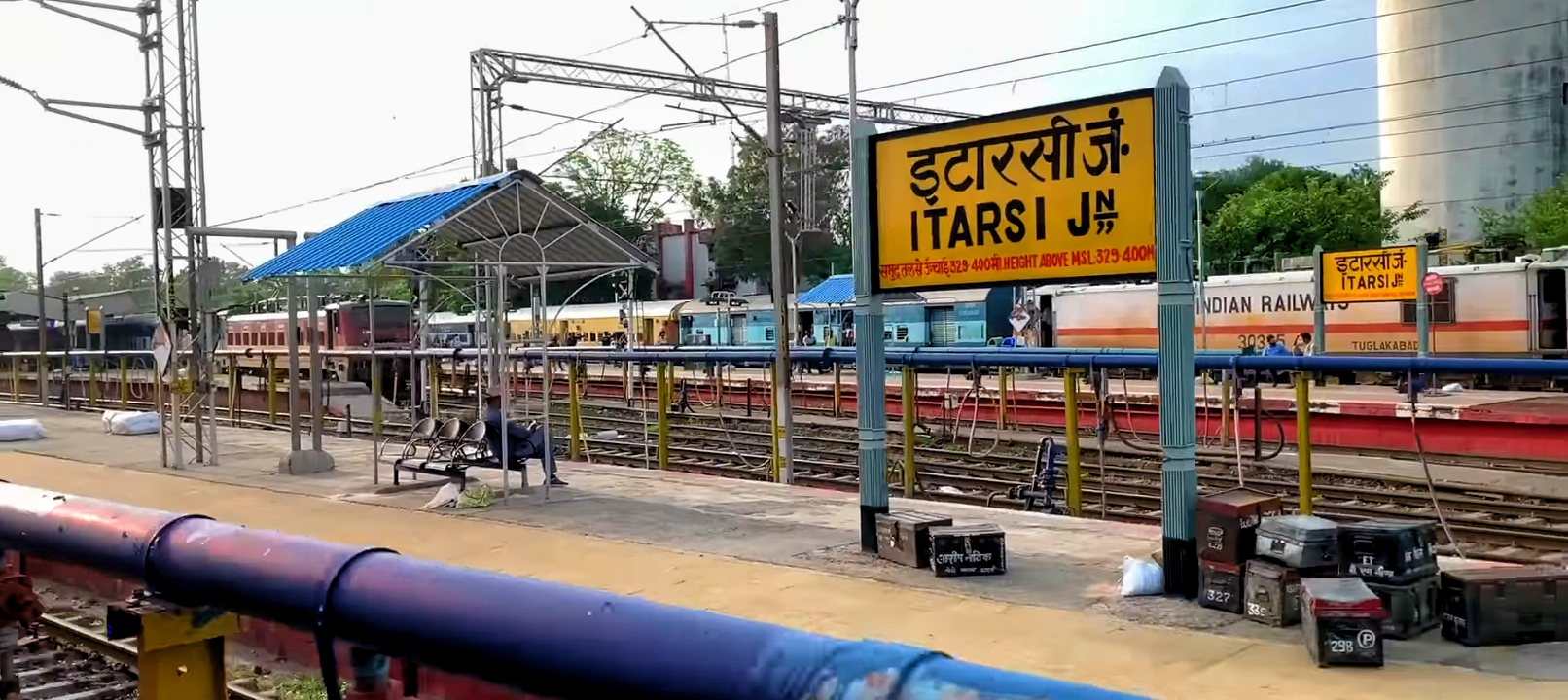
- Itarsi Junction is an Important railway station on Bhopal–Nagpur section

Overview
- Status: Operational
- Owner: Indian Railways
- Termini: Bhopal; Nagpur

Service
- Operator(s): West Central Railway, Central Railway
- Depot: Itarsi
- Rolling stock: WDM-2, WDM-3A, WDM-3D, WDS-6 and WDP-4 diesel locos. WAM-4, WAP-4, WAP-7 and WAG-5 electric locos.

History
- Opened: 1924

Technical
- Track length: 390 km (242 mi)
- Number of tracks: 2/3
- Track gauge: 5 ft 6 in (1,676 mm) broad gauge
- Electrification: 1988–91
- Operating speed: up to 130 km/h

The Bhopal–Nagpur section is a railway line connecting Bhopal and Nagpur. This 390 km (242 mi) track is part of the Delhi–Chennai line. The section is under the jurisdiction of West Central Railway and Central Railway.

== History ==
The Bhopal–Itarsi line was opened by the Begum of Bhopal in 1884. Itarsi was linked with Nagpur between 1923 and 1924. The Bhopal–itarsi-Nagpur line became part of the Delhi–Chennai line in 1929.

== Electrification ==
The Bhopal–Itarsi sector was electrified in 1988–89 and the Nagpur–Itarsi sector in 1990–91.

== Speed limits ==
The Delhi–Chennai Central line (Grand Trunk route) is classified as a "Group A" line which can take speeds up to 160 km/h.

== Passenger movement ==
Bhopal, Rani Kamalapati, Itarsi and Nagpur Junction are amongst the top hundred booking stations of Indian Railway.

== Loco sheds and workshops ==
Itarsi diesel shed holds 145+ locos. It has WDM-2, WDM-3A, WDM-3D, WDS-6 and WDP-4 diesel locos. This shed serves routes all across central India. Electric Loco Shed, Itarsi came up in the 1980s. It holds WAM-4, WAP-4 and WAG-5 electric locos. Its WAG-5 locos perform banking duties on the Budni–Barkhera Ghat section. There are also ghat sections between Teegaon–Chinchoda and Dharakhoh–Maramjhiri In Bhopal–Nagpur section where bankers are attached to trains. Broad Gauge Coach Workshop at Bhopal handles rebuilding and overhaul of old passenger coaches. There is a coach maintenance workshop at Nagpur.
