= Mumbai Mafia: Police vs Underworld =

2023 Documentary film

- Directed by: Raaghav Dar; Francis Longhurst
- Produced by: Morgan Matthews; Sophie Jones
- Starring: Aftab Ahmed Khan; Alex Perry; Feroz Sayed; Minty Tejpal; Pradeep Sharma; Puja Changoiwala; Shyam Kishore; Ravindranath Angre
- Edited by: Nic Zimmermann
- Production company: Minnow Films
- Distributed by: Netflix
- Release date: 6 January 2023
- Running time: 87 minutes
- Country: India
- Languages: Hindi; English

Mumbai Mafia: Police vs The Underworld is a 2023 Netflix documentary film produced by Morgan Matthews and Sophie Jones and directed by Raaghav Dar and Francis Longhurst under banner of Minnow Films. It depicts clashes between Mumbai Police and Indian mafia Dawood Ibrahim and his companions like Abu Salem and others.

== Synopsis ==
As the name defines, Mumbai Mafia: Police vs Underworld is about D-Company and interviews with the officers of Mumbai who narrated how they have tackled and escalated the crimes and the underworld mafias.

== Cast ==
- A.A. Khan as self
- Alex Perry as self
- Feroz Sayed as self
- Minty Tejpal as self
- Pradeep Sharma as self
- Puja Changoiwala as self
- Shyam Kishore as self
- Ravindra Angre as self

== Release ==
Mumbai Mafia: Police vs Underworld released on 6 January 2023 at Netflix.

== Reception ==
Sreeparna Sengupta for The Times of India rated 3.5/5 and wrote "Directors Francis Longhurst and Raaghav Dar tell it like it is - using first person narratives and archival footage to piece together a compelling documentary. The intriguing background music (Rishi Rich) and gritty, grainy re-dramatisations of certain portions, bring alive the 80s and 90s feel."

Tina Das for ThePrint rated 4.5/5 stars and wrote "The documentary traces the rise and fall of the cops, including that of Vijay Salaskar, another encounter specialist who was killed in action during 26/11. And how their popularity inspired multiple Bollywood movies, and a near cult following among local people. But the tide turned soon after a TIME magazine report in 2003 that raised questions on the police’s credibility and the ‘encounters’ it had conducted."

Mrinal Rajaram of The New Indian Express felt the documentary missed a lot of historical fact and wrote "There is no mention of Haji Mastan, Varadarajan Mudaliar, and Karim Lala—three mainstays of that milieu. Their influence had begun receding in the ’80s but they were still around. Chhota Rajan, a former key aide of Dawood’s, is not brought up in conversation, either."

Ajit Andhare of Deccan Chronicle wrote "A.A. Khan, Ravindra Angre, and most importantly Pradeep Sharma take us through the sinister underbelly of Mumbai in 90s when the underworld ruled the roost and it was a war between pistols and AK-47s."

Manik Sharma for Firstpost wrote "Mumbai Mafia’s strength is obviously its intimate access to Tangre, Sharma and Khan. These men fronted the takedown of a burgeoning empire that rocked the country, let alone the financial capital. Both Tangre and Sharma speak dispassionately, as if hardened to resemble metallic droids that have gathered rust as a form of safety mechanism."

Simran Srivastav for English Jagran wrote "The documentary brilliantly shows the horrific shootout at Lokhandwala from the first-hand encounter of Minty Tejpal. Meanwhile, author and former investigative journalist Hussain Zaidi shares his in-depth research on the fight of Mumbai police against the mafias."

Mrinal Rajaram of Cinema Express rate 3/5 stars and wrote "Mumbai Mafia does well to glean various perspectives from across the board, painting of a vivid picture. It is as critical of the ruthless mafia as it is of extrajudicial murders being routinely carried out by the police."

Lubaba Mahjabin Prima for The Daily Star wrote "The documentary delves deep and explores several concepts untapped before. Encounters are viewed from the police force's point of view. The inner thoughts and professional dynamics that go on are narrated. On the other hand, how often lack of opportunities and belonging trap men into the structure of organized crime is depicted."

Tittle Press wrote in their review "Globally, Mumbai Mafia: Police vs. Underworld the documentary is a must see. This is not a typical cops vs. bad guy saga. It explains how the definition of villains changes over time."

== See also ==
- List of Netflix India originals
