= Suicide of Sushant Singh Rajput =

2020 death of Indian actor

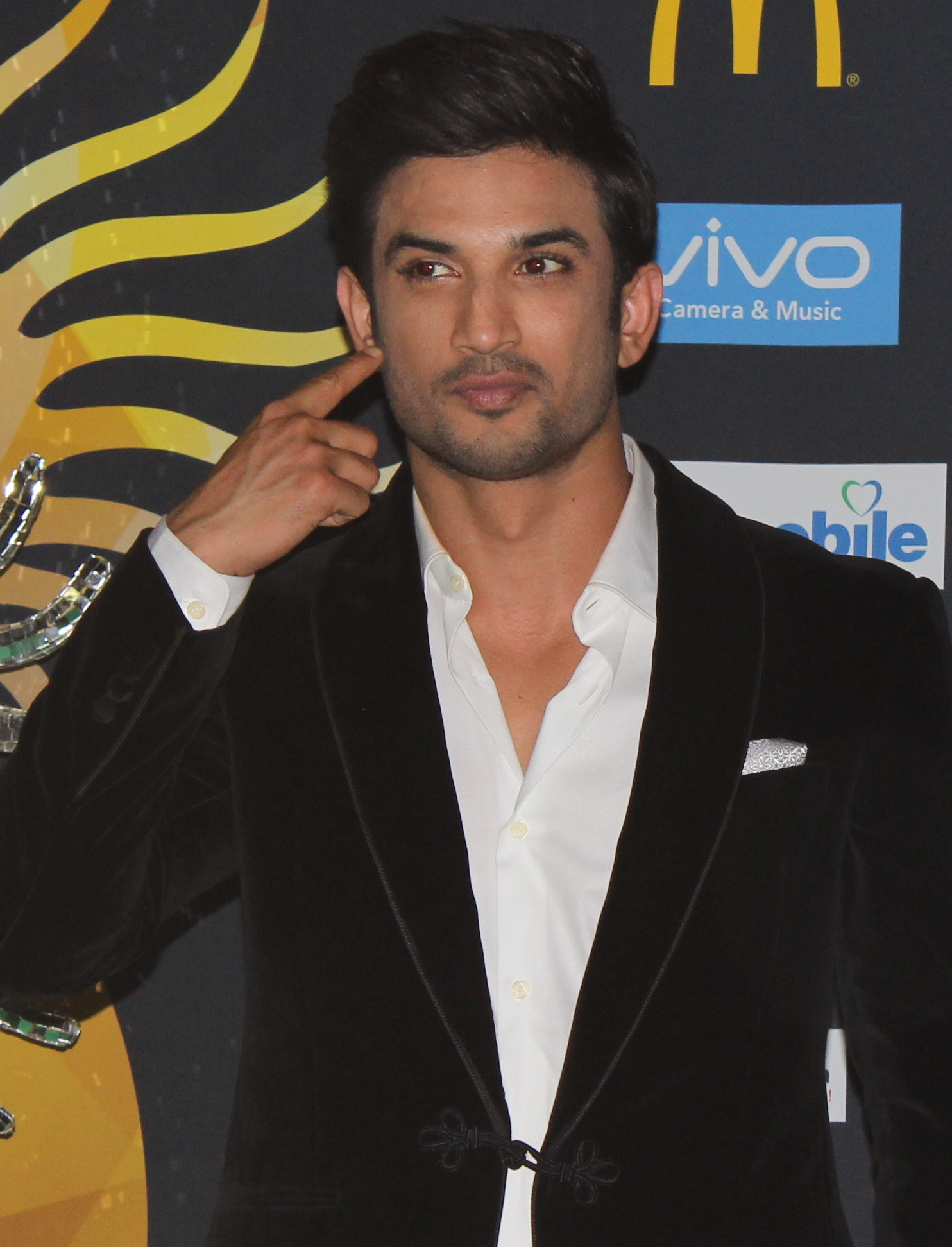
- Rajput in 2017
- Date: 14 June 2020; 6 years ago
- Location: Bandra, Mumbai, Maharashtra, India
- Cause: Asphyxia due to hanging
- Burial: 15 June 2020, at the Pawan Hans Crematorium, Vile Parle

On 14 June 2020, Indian actor Sushant Singh Rajput was found dead at his room in Bandra, Mumbai, aged 34. The cause of death was ruled as suicide, with official postmortem reports confirming Rajput died of asphyxia due to hanging. The Mumbai Police launched an investigation into the death, which had become a subject of widespread speculation and rumours.

The case was handed to the Central Bureau of Investigation, who filed a closure report on 22 March 2025 ruling out foul play.

== Timeline ==
A week before his suicide, Rajput had searched for three subjects multiple times on the Internet: Disha Salian, who he had worked with on some projects and who had died about a week before him; news reports containing his own name; and information about a mental illness.

On 13 June 2020, the night before his death, Rajput retired to his bedroom after dinner. At around 2 a.m. on Sunday, 14 June, he made two phone calls; one to Bollywood actress Rhea Chakraborty and another to television actor Mahesh Shetty. However, neither call was answered. Rajput then woke up early that morning. Sometime later, he searched for information on "schizophrenia", "bipolar disorder" and "painless death" using Google.

Two of Rajput's friends were living with him. On the morning of 14 June, he spoke to his sister over the telephone at around 9 a.m. and an hour later, he had a glass of juice and his tablets. At around 11:30 a.m., his cook knocked several times on the door of his room, to confirm the menu for the day. He and Rajput's friends received no response. They then called a locksmith to open the door, after which they called Rajput's sister and the police. He was found hanging from the ceiling fan. No suicide note was recovered.

The Indian Express reported that the Mumbai Police said the actor had shown symptoms of clinical depression and was consulting a psychiatrist since some time. Times Now reported that medical papers and anti-depressant pills were found in his house.

== Investigation ==
The Mumbai Police commenced an investigation, stating the death was being treated as a suicide. A team of three doctors conducted an autopsy and submitted their provisional postmortem report at Bandra Police Station. On 15 June 2020, the Mumbai deputy commissioner of police said, "The provisional cause of death is asphyxia due to hanging." The final postmortem report, received on 25 June 2020, confirmed the cause of the death as asphyxia due to hanging and said it was a "clear case of suicide." The autopsy doctors placed the time of death at 10 to 12 hours before postmortem examination on 14 June at 11:30 p.m.—meaning between 11:30 a.m. and 1:30 p.m. (Indian Standard Time). The report added that no foul play was found. On 27 July 2020, Mumbai Police received the viscera report, which likewise ruled out any foul play.

On 15 June 2020, the then Maharashtra home minister Anil Deshmukh stated that the police would also probe "professional rivalry" in the film industry as the cause of Rajput's depression. The police revealed Rajput was upset with being linked to the death of Disha Salian. Salian had died five days before him, and a case of accidental death was registered. She died after falling from the fourteenth floor of her building. On 3 August 2020, Police Commissioner of Mumbai Param Bir Singh said investigators had found no link between the deaths of Rajput and Salian.

Interrogation of three psychiatrists and one psychotherapist confirmed Rajput had consulted them and was on medication prescribed by them.

The police also revealed that Rajput had initially tried to hang himself with the belt of a bathrobe, but it could not sustain his weight. Following this, he used a green kurta. His clothes were strewn over the floor of his bedroom; the police concluded they had fallen out when he had pulled the kurta from his cupboard. Due to a discrepancy between his height and the distance between his bed and the ceiling fan, the police concluded he had hanged himself in an inclined position. No sign of struggle was found.

=== Case against Rhea Chakraborty ===
On 25 July 2020, Rajput's father, K. K. Singh, filed an FIR at Patna, where he lives, against Rhea Chakraborty and six others, including her family members, for abetment of suicide. He also accused them of wrongful restraint, wrongful confinement, theft, criminal breach of trust, and cheating. He alleged in his complaint that Chakraborty cheated Rajput financially and mentally harassed him. On 28 July, India Today reported that Chakraborty had been booked in the case. In a petition filed at the Supreme Court, Chakraborty claimed she had no role in the actor's death and was falsely implicated by Rajput's father. She also sought transfer of the probe in the FIR to Mumbai, saying that there cannot be an impartial investigation in Bihar.

Acting on the FIR filed in Patna, an investigative team was formed by Bihar Police and was sent to Mumbai to probe the case. Although the investigation only continued for a brief period, as the case was later transferred to CBI. The Enforcement Directorate (ED), which investigates financial crimes, also registered a money laundering case over transactions worth 15 crores rupees based on the complaint registered by Rajput's father.

Multiple reports stated that Sushant had hosted a party at his house on 13 June 2020, the night before his death. This was denied by Mumbai Police and his house help, who was interrogated by Bihar Police. Mumbai Police initially reported that the CCTV in Rajput's house was not working, but on 3 August said they had assessed CCTV footage that ruled out any party at Rajput's Bandra apartment on 13 June 2020.

On 3 August 2020, Mumbai's police commissioner said there was no misappropriation of funds from Rajput's bank accounts and no money had been transferred to Rhea Chakraborty's accounts. On 4 August 2020, Mumbai Police appointed Grant Thornton as the financial forensic auditor in the case. During the investigation, Hindustan Times reported that Mumbai Police claimed that the actor's family had informally complained to police in February 2020 expressing concerns about Rajput's condition and had asked police to physically abuse Chakraborty in order to pressure her to end the relationship.

On 22 February 2024, the Bombay High Court cancelled the Look out circular against Chakraborty, her brother and father which had prevented them travelling abroad. In its judgement, the court reiterated its view that Rajput had committed suicide.

=== Central Bureau of Investigation ===
On 6 August 2020, the Central Bureau of Investigation (CBI), the Indian national government's top investigating agency, re-registered the Patna Police FIR accusing Chakraborty and others of wrongdoing, thus taking over the case.

On 19 August 2020, the Supreme Court allowed the CBI to take control of the investigation and ordered the CBI to look into any future cases registered in relation to Rajput's death. On 21 August 2020, Sudhir Gupta, head of the Department of Forensic Medicine at All India Institute of Medical Sciences, New Delhi (AIIMS) and leader of a forensic medical team tasked by CBI for assistance, told the Press Trust of India, "We will look into the possibility of murder. However, all probable angles will be thoroughly examined." Gupta told Asian News International (ANI), "We will also examine other trace evidence preserved at the time of autopsy to differentiate between hanging and murder allegations." On 22 March 2025, the CBI filed a closure report, ruling out foul play in the actor's death.

=== Narcotics case ===
On 26 August 2020, the Narcotics Control Bureau (NCB), India's national drug law enforcement agency, registered an FIR against Rhea, her brother Showik, and three others. The ED had requested the NCB to join the investigation after its financial probe found that drugs were supplied to Rhea and Sushant. Specifically, the FIR invoked sections of India's Narcotic Drugs and Psychotropic Substances Act (NDPS Act) dealing with cannabis. On 4 September 2020, the NCB arrested Showik Chakraborty and Sushant Singh Rajput's house manager, charging them under provisions of the NDPS Act. The NCB arrested Rhea Chakraborty on 9 September for allegedly procuring drugs for Rajput; she was one of 20 people arrested by the NCB in connection with the drugs angle being probed in the actor's death. On 6 October 2020, Mumbai Sessions Court extended Chakraborty's judicial remand until 20 October 2020, but a day later, she was granted bail by the Bombay High Court. The high court rejected the NCB's theory that Chakraborty had harboured and financed Rajput's drug addiction, finding instead that she was not part of the chain of drug dealers involved in the case. "She has not forwarded the drugs allegedly procured by her to somebody else to earn monetary or other benefits," wrote Justice Sarang Kotwal. On 5 March 2021, the NCB submitted a chargesheet against 33 people, including Chakraborty and her brother. On 28 May 2021, Singh's flatmate Siddarth Pithani was arrested by NCB. After 2 unsuccessful bail applications, Pithani was granted bail on 4 July 2022. On 12 July 2022, the NCB filed draft charges against 35 people, including Rhea Chakraborty and her brother. The NCB claimed that Rajput had been using numerous people to obtain drugs since 2018 and accused his flatmate Pithani and others of "aiding and abetting" Rajput to "extreme drug addiction."

=== Case against Rajput's sister Priyanka ===
On 7 September 2020, Chakraborty filed an FIR against the late actor's sisters, claiming that Rajput "was unlawfully prescribed psychotrophic substances at the behest of his sister Priyanka" and that these had been supplied without proper consultation and using a forged prescription. She requested an investigation into whether these had resulted in his suicide or a decline in his mental state.

The following month, Rajput's sisters asked the High Court to cancel the FIR. The Bombay High Court agreed to invalidate the FIR against his sister Meetu but upheld the FIR against his sister Priyanka, stating that there was "prima facie evidence" against her. The Supreme Court also rejected an appeal filed by Priyanka Singh, and the filing was handed to the CBI to investigate.

=== Forensic report ===
On 3 October 2020, Dr. Sudhir Gupta of AIIMS, leader of the CBI-designated forensic medical team, said, "Sushant death is a case of suicide. Murder completely ruled out." Gupta told ANI, "There were no injuries over the body other than hanging. There were no marks of struggle/scuffle in the body and clothes of the deceased." On 5 October, ANI reported that the AIIMS medical board had submitted its report to CBI confirming that Rajput died by suicide and ruling out the murder angle. On 15 October, the CBI said it "continues to investigate the death of Rajput. There are certain speculative reports in the media that the CBI has reached a conclusion. It may be reiterated that these reports are speculative and erroneous."

== Public reactions ==
Rajput's death was generally perceived as being unexpected and shocking and sparked debates over mental health. Several prominent leaders and actors responded on social media. On Twitter, Prime Minister Narendra Modi called Rajput "a bright young actor gone too soon". Former Indian cricketer Sachin Tendulkar and former Indian cricket team captain Virat Kohli also expressed their shock on Twitter.

A few hours after Rajput's death, Congress leader Sanjay Nirupam claimed that Rajput had signed on to seven films after his 2019 box office hit Chhichhore but had lost them all within a span of six months.

On 15 June 2020, the Maharashtra Cyber Police tweeted that some pictures of Rajput's corpse being circulated online were "disturbing and in bad taste", warning people that posting such pictures on social media would invite legal action.

As of 31 July 2020, at least three fans had reportedly committed copycat suicide, including a 30-year-old television actor and a 13-year-old girl using the same method as Rajput.

Following allegations that Rhea Chakraborty was responsible for his death, some Bhojpuri songs, which abused and threatened her, became popular in his home state of Bihar.

Rajput's sister Shweta Singh Kirti initiated a 'Global Prayers for SSR' campaign to urge all to collectively pray for him on 15 August at 10:00 am local time. Along with family members and fans, many celebrities include Kriti Sanon, Ankita Lokhande and Ekta Kapoor also joined in this movement.

During the course of ongoing investigations, the case received widespread and continuous media coverage and attention. On 3 September 2020, considering two public interest litigation petitions alleging an "unfair, malicious and false media campaign" against Mumbai Police, the Bombay High Court advised, "We urge and expect the media to exercise restraint in reporting of the investigation regarding the death, [such that it] would not hamper investigation in any manner." On 5 October 2020, Mumbai Police stated that its cyber unit had identified more than 80,000 fake accounts on social media platforms from various countries in Asia and Europe seeking to discredit their ongoing official investigation. Police Commissioner Param Bir Singh termed this as "a motivated campaign with vested interests" to malign Mumbai Police. He added that those found to have violated the law would be prosecuted under the Information Technology Act. On 23 October 2020, the nongovernmental News Broadcasting Standards Authority directed news channels Aaj Tak, Zee News, News 24 and India TV to air an apology for insensitive reporting and sensationalising Rajput's death. Several people were arrested by Mumbai Police and were booked under various sections of the Indian Penal Code. They were accused by Mumbai Police for concocting conspiracy theories and making sensational and defamatory allegations against the Maharashtra government and Mumbai Police.

A road in New Delhi was renamed "Sushant Singh Rajput Marg" in memory of the actor.

=== Politics ===
A social media study titled, Anatomy of a Rumour had found that the BJP leaders and their supporters were actively promoting the murder conspiracy theory for the death. BJP had used Sushant's death as a campaign issue in 2020 Bihar Legislative Assembly election. Newslaundry reported that BJP had portrayed Sushant as "a son of Bihar who fell victim to the big bad world of Bollywood, run by the old elite".

=== Request for CBI probe ===
Rajput's maternal uncle, alleging that his nephew was murdered, had demanded a CBI probe on the day of the actor's death. Several political leaders, mostly from Bihar, also demanded a CBI investigation into the case. Hindi actor Shekhar Suman created a forum called #justiceforSushantforum demanding a CBI probe into the death. Actress and BJP Rajya Sabha MP Roopa Ganguly, in a series of tweets with the hashtag #cbiforsushant, questioned the actor's death and called for an "independent unbiased CBI investigation".

Rajput's fans demanded an inquiry on various social platforms. On 16 July 2020, Hindustan Times reported that following Rajput's suicide, "a massive online campaign fuelled by conspiracy theories has been demanding a CBI investigation into the matter." Actress Rhea Chakraborty, who "identified herself as Sushant's girlfriend," wrote the Hindustan Times, asked for the aid of Amit Shah, India's Minister of Home Affairs, in launching a CBI probe. Former union minister Subramanian Swamy wrote a letter to PM Modi requesting a CBI probe, which was acknowledged by the PM's office on 25 July.

Maharashtra Home Minister Anil Deshmukh questioned the necessity of a CBI probe into the death. "The Mumbai Police is competent enough to handle such cases," he said on 17 July. On 22 July, the Twitter hashtag #Candle4SSR trended with two million tweets from Rajput's fans around the world, as part of their online campaigns demanding a CBI investigation since the actor's death. On 29 July, Home Minister Deshmukh reiterated that the investigation would not be transferred to the CBI.

On 5 August 2020, however, Tushar Mehta, Solicitor General of India, told the Supreme Court that the executive branch of India's national government had accepted the recommendation by Bihar's state government for a CBI inquiry into Rajput's death. On that basis, officials said, the CBI had decided to start the probe. On 8 August 2020, the Maharashtra government told the Supreme Court that the CBI had shown "indecent haste" and should not have registered the case while proceedings were still pending before the court.

== Nepotism debate and impact ==
Rajput's death sparked a debate in India about nepotism and related malpractices in the Hindi film industry. A day after Rajput's death, actress and filmmaker Kangana Ranaut speculated that the actor was a victim of the Hindi film industry's nepotistic nature, suggesting it didn't acknowledge Rajput's work, which led to his mental suffering. A case was registered against Karan Johar, Sanjay Leela Bhansali, Salman Khan, Ekta Kapoor and four others in the Patna High Court by a lawyer, Sudhir Kumar Ojha, alleging that Rajput had been denied opportunities due to nepotism, leading to his suicide, but the case was later dismissed on 8 July. Johar and Alia Bhatt were then bullied on social media.

Following this, Simi Garewal and A. R. Rahman spoke about nepotism that they faced in Bollywood. Sonu Nigam referred to the nepotism in the music industry as "music mafia".

Amid the debate over nepotism, vote brigading by Rajput's fans led to the trailer of Sadak 2, released on 12 August 2020, becoming the most disliked trailer on YouTube within 24 hours of its release. Speculating that Rajput had despaired of being shut out of the film industry due to favouritism, his fans blamed Hindi film industry insiders, including Mahesh Bhatt, director of Sadak 2, and his daughter Alia Bhatt, one of the film's stars, who had earlier made dismissive remarks about Rajput in Koffee with Karan.

== Funeral and immersion ==
Sushant Singh Rajput was cremated by his father at Pawan Hans Crematorium, Vile Parle, Mumbai on 15 June 2020. Actors Kriti Sanon, Dino Morea, Shraddha Kapoor, Vivek Oberoi, Ranvir Shorey among others were present at his funeral proceedings. After cremation, Sushant Singh Rajput's ashes were immersed by his family members in Ganges River, Patna on 18 June 2020.

== See also ==
- Hindutva boycott of Bollywood films, related movement
