= Charansing Thakur =

Indian politician

Charangsing Thakur

Member of the Maharashtra Legislative Assembly
- Incumbent
- Assumed office 26 November 2024
- Preceded by: Anil Deshmukh
- Constituency: Katol

Personal details
- Born: 1 September 1959 (age 66) Nagpur, Maharashtra, India
- Party: Bharatiya Janata Party
- Other political affiliations: Republican Party of India (Athawale)
- Occupation: Politician

Charansing Babulalji Thakur (born 1 September 1959) is an Indian politician from Maharashtra. He is a member of the Maharashtra Legislative Assembly from Katol Assembly constituency in Nagpur district. He won the 2024 Maharashtra Legislative Assembly election representing the Bharatiya Janata Party.

== Early life and education ==
Thakur is from Katol, Nagpur district, Maharashtra. He is the son of Babulal Mehtapsing Thakur. He studied Class 12 and passed the examinations conducted by the Maharashtra Secondary and Higher Secondary Education Board, Nagpur, in 1988.

== Political career ==
Charansing Thakur is a member of the Rashtriya Swayamsevak Sangh (RSS), a far-right Hindu nationalist paramilitary volunteer organisation. Thakur won from Katol Assembly constituency representing the Bharatiya Janata Party in the 2024 Maharashtra Legislative Assembly election. He polled 104,338 votes and defeated his nearest rival and former home minister, Anil Deshmukh's son Salil of the Nationalist Congress Party (SP), by a margin of 38,816 votes. Earlier, in the 2019 Maharashtra Legislative Assembly election, he lost to Anil Deshmukh of the Nationalist Congress Party, by a margin of 17,057 votes.
