= Katol Assembly constituency =

Constituency of the Maharashtra legislative assembly in India

Coordinates: 21.27°N 78.59°E

Katol
- Constituency No. 48 for the Maharashtra Legislative Assembly
- Charansing Thakur, present MLA of Katol

Constituency details
- Country: India
- Region: Western India
- State: Maharashtra
- District: Nagpur
- Lok Sabha constituency: Ramtek
- Established: 1952
- Total electors: 281,789
- Reservation: None

Member of Legislative Assembly
- 15th Maharashtra Legislative Assembly
- Incumbent Charansing Thakur
- Party: BJP
- Alliance: MahaYuti
- Elected year: 2024

Katol Assembly constituency is one of the 288 Vidhan Sabha (legislative assembly) constituencies of Maharashtra state in western India.

== Overview ==
Katol (constituency number 48) is one of the 12 Vidhan Sabha constituencies located in the Nagpur district. It covers the entire Narkhed and Katol talukas and part of Nagpur (Rural) taluka. Number of electorates was 245,811 in 2009 (male 128,076, female 117,735).

Katol is part of the Ramtek Lok Sabha constituency along with five other Vidhan Sabha segments of this district, namely Savner, Hingna, Umred, Kamthi and Ramtek. In the 2014 Maharashtra Assembly Election the candidates listed below were standing in this assembly seat:-

- Ashish Ranjit Deshmukh- - Bhartiya Janta Party
- Rahul Virendrababu Deshmukh- - Shetakari Kamagar paksh
- Rajendra Harne- - Shivsena
- Dinesh Thakre- - Indian National Congress
- Anil Vasantrao Deshmukh- - Nationalist Congress Party
- Gaikwad- - Maharashtra Navnirman Sena
- Vrushabh gajananrao Wankhede-aam

Admi party

== Members of the Legislative Assembly ==
Year	Member	Party
1952	Shankarrao Daulatrao Gedam	Indian National Congress
1957	Shankarrao Daulatrao Gedam	Indian National Congress
1962	Shankarrao Daulatrao Gedam	Indian National Congress
1967	Jiwanlal Chandak	Independent
1972	Shankarrao Daulatrao Gedam	Indian National Congress
1978	Mukundrao Mankar	Indian National Congress (I)
1980	Shrikant Jichkar	Indian National Congress (I)
1985	Sunil Shinde	Indian Congress (Socialist)
1990	Sunil Shinde	Indian National Congress
1995	Anil Deshmukh	Independent
1999	Anil Deshmukh	Nationalist Congress Party
2004	Anil Deshmukh	Nationalist Congress Party
2009	Anil Deshmukh	Nationalist Congress Party
2014	Ashish Deshmukh	Bharatiya Janata Party
2019	Anil Deshmukh	Nationalist Congress Party
2024	Charansing Thakur	Bharatiya Janata Party

== Election results ==
=== Assembly Election 2024 ===
2024 Maharashtra Legislative Assembly election : Katol
Party	Candidate	Votes	%	±%
BJP	Charansing Babulalji Thakur	104,338	52.85%	▲10.41
NCP-SP	Salil Anilbabu Deshmukh	65,522	33.19%	New
Independent	Yajnavalkya Shrikant Jichkar	13,922	7.05%	New
PWPI	Rahul Virendrababu Deshmukh	6,182	3.13%	New
VBA	Vivek Ramchandra Gayakwad	1,983	1.00%	▼2.08
NOTA	None of the Above	1,543	0.78%	▼0.28
MNS	Sagar Arun Dudhane	1,232	0.62%	New
Margin of victory		38,816	19.66%	▲10.59
Turnout		198,980	70.61%	▲1.02
Total valid votes		197,437		
Registered electors		281,789		▲3.49
BJP gain from NCP		Swing	▲1.34	

=== Assembly Election 2019 ===
2019 Maharashtra Legislative Assembly election : Katol
Party	Candidate	Votes	%	±%
NCP	Anil Vasantrao Deshmukh	96,842	51.51%	▲14.87
BJP	Charansing Babulalji Thakur	79,785	42.44%	▲2.65
VBA	Dinesh Gunvant Tule	5,807	3.09%	New
NOTA	None of the Above	2,004	1.07%	▲0.75
BSP	Mohammad Junaidbab Mohammad Walibaba	1,366	0.73%	▼0.93
Independent	Charan Kamal Thakur	1,237	0.66%	New
Margin of victory		17,057	9.07%	▲5.93
Turnout		190,293	69.89%	▼1.44
Total valid votes		188,013		
Registered electors		272,288		▲8.56
NCP gain from BJP		Swing	▲11.72	

=== Assembly Election 2014 ===
2014 Maharashtra Legislative Assembly election : Katol
Party	Candidate	Votes	%	±%
BJP	Dr. Ashish Deshmukh	70,344	39.79%	New
NCP	Anil Vasantrao Deshmukh	64,787	36.64%	▼5.89
SS	Rajendra Manohar Harne	13,649	7.72%	▼11.86
PWPI	Rahul Virendrababu Deshmukh	9,589	5.42%	New
INC	Dinesh Sheshrao Thakare	4,789	2.71%	New
BSP	Sudhir Jagannath Metangale	2,930	1.66%	▲0.33
Independent	Gayatri Pandurang Gharat	1,740	0.98%	New
NOTA	None of the Above	550	0.31%	New
Margin of victory		5,557	3.14%	▼16.96
Turnout		177,656	70.83%	▲5.32
Total valid votes		176,806		
Registered electors		250,822		▲2.04
BJP gain from NCP		Swing	▼2.75	

=== Assembly Election 2009 ===
2009 Maharashtra Legislative Assembly election : Katol
Party	Candidate	Votes	%	±%
NCP	Anil Vasantrao Deshmukh	68,143	42.54%	▼22.03
RPI(A)	Charansing Babulalji Thakur	35,940	22.43%	New
SS	Kiran Krushnarao Pandav	31,372	19.58%	▼6.46
Independent	Rahul Virendrababu Deshmukh	10,120	6.32%	New
Independent	Dr. Sunilbhau Vishwanathji Narnaware	2,512	1.57%	New
Independent	Adv. Ulhas Shalikaram Dupare	2,501	1.56%	New
BSP	Dongre Vijay Natthuji	2,126	1.33%	▼3.18
Margin of victory		32,203	20.10%	▼18.42
Turnout		160,361	65.24%	▼6.54
Total valid votes		160,200		
Registered electors		245,811		▲51.40
NCP hold		Swing	▼22.03	

=== Assembly Election 2004 ===
2004 Maharashtra Legislative Assembly election : Katol
Party	Candidate	Votes	%	±%
NCP	Anil Vasantrao Deshmukh	75,173	64.56%	▲21.28
SS	Shinde Satish Sunil	30,324	26.04%	▲16.25
BSP	Pramod Anandrao Deshmukh	5,243	4.50%	▲3.79
Independent	Sheikh Lukmaan Haidarmiya	2,672	2.29%	New
GGP	Ramesh Shamrao Maraskolhe	1,019	0.88%	▼1.38
Margin of victory		44,849	38.52%	▲26.01
Turnout		116,460	71.73%	▲6.05
Total valid votes		116,434		
Registered electors		162,354		▲8.55
NCP hold		Swing	▲21.28	

=== Assembly Election 1999 ===
1999 Maharashtra Legislative Assembly election : Katol
Party	Candidate	Votes	%	±%
NCP	Anil Vasantrao Deshmukh	42,509	43.29%	New
PWPI	Virendrababu Kashirao Deshmukh	30,227	30.78%	▲8.84
INC	Gupta Rameshbabu Balmukundji	12,937	13.17%	▼3.89
SS	Kalmegh Dipti Dilip	9,614	9.79%	New
GGP	Dhurve Suresh Mohanlal	2,216	2.26%	New
BSP	Sunil Santoshrao Manohar	704	0.72%	▼2.81
Margin of victory		12,282	12.51%	▲9.08
Turnout		105,276	70.39%	▼12.03
Total valid votes		98,207		
Registered electors		149,564		▼1.15
NCP gain from Independent		Swing	▲17.93	

=== Assembly Election 1995 ===
1995 Maharashtra Legislative Assembly election : Katol
Party	Candidate	Votes	%	±%
Independent	Anil Vasantrao Deshmukh	29,807	25.36%	New
PWPI	Virendrababu Kashirao Deshmukh	25,784	21.93%	New
INC	Sunil Shamrao Shinde	20,057	17.06%	▼24.80
Independent	Diptibai Dilipbabu kalmegh	14,545	12.37%	New
Independent	Neole Ram Mannalal	9,508	8.09%	New
BJP	Barokar Preranatai Prataprao	7,659	6.52%	▼12.18
BSP	Deshmukh Pramod Anandrao	4,151	3.53%	New
Margin of victory		4,023	3.42%	▼10.24
Turnout		120,092	79.37%	▲10.33
Total valid votes		117,550		
Registered electors		151,298		▲13.48
Independent gain from INC		Swing	▼16.51	

=== Assembly Election 1990 ===
1990 Maharashtra Legislative Assembly election : Katol
Party	Candidate	Votes	%	±%
INC	Sunil Shamrao Shinde	37,597	41.87%	▲1.67
JD	Ram Mannalal Neole	25,327	28.20%	New
BJP	Gangadhar Kothiram Korde	16,791	18.70%	New
Independent	Rajendra Hanumantrao Deshmukh	2,948	3.28%	New
Independent	Bhalavi Pandurang Buddhaji	1,246	1.39%	New
INS(SCS)	Bhajan Natthudeo Madhodeo	1,160	1.29%	New
Independent	Chandrashekhar Laxmanrao (Dada) Kolhe	924	1.03%	New
Margin of victory		12,270	13.66%	▲2.57
Turnout		91,137	68.36%	▼2.89
Total valid votes		89,804		
Registered electors		133,320		▲24.47
INC gain from IC(S)		Swing	▼9.43	

=== Assembly Election 1985 ===
1985 Maharashtra Legislative Assembly election : Katol
Party	Candidate	Votes	%	±%
IC(S)	Sunil Shamrao Shinde	38,596	51.30%	New
INC	Shrikant Ramchandra Jichkar	30,246	40.20%	New
Independent	Somkuwar Dajiba Lalji	3,112	4.14%	New
Independent	Kodape Natthu Ramaji	1,626	2.16%	New
RPI	Chavan Mahadeorao	1,170	1.56%	New
Margin of victory		8,350	11.10%	▼12.30
Turnout		76,409	71.34%	▲10.77
Total valid votes		75,240		
Registered electors		107,106		▲8.98
IC(S) gain from INC(I)		Swing	▲5.85	

=== Assembly Election 1980 ===
1980 Maharashtra Legislative Assembly election : Katol
Party	Candidate	Votes	%	±%
INC(I)	Shrikant Ramchandra Jichkar	26,564	45.45%	▼5.70
BJP	Korde Gangadhar Kothiramji	12,889	22.05%	New
INC(U)	Kalmegh Vasantrao Gulabrao	9,479	16.22%	New
PWPI	Virendrababu Kashirao Deshmukh	4,617	7.90%	▲1.42
RPI(K)	Chavan Shankar Mahadeorao	4,298	7.35%	New
Independent	Chauke Baburao Marotrao	604	1.03%	New
Margin of victory		13,675	23.40%	▲3.11
Turnout		59,455	60.49%	▼17.11
Total valid votes		58,451		
Registered electors		98,281		▲4.61
INC(I) hold		Swing	▼5.70	

=== Assembly Election 1978 ===
1978 Maharashtra Legislative Assembly election : Katol
Party	Candidate	Votes	%	±%
INC(I)	Mankar Mukundrao Govindrao	36,800	51.15%	New
JP	Pawade Motiram Gulabrao	22,207	30.86%	New
INC	Shankarrao Daulatrao Gedam	6,608	9.18%	▼44.63
PWPI	Virendrababu Kashirao Deshmukh	4,660	6.48%	New
Independent	Patole Murolihdar Bawaji	1,150	1.60%	New
Independent	Ingale Velkanthrao Ganpatrao	525	0.73%	New
Margin of victory		14,593	20.28%	▲7.72
Turnout		73,527	78.26%	▲1.62
Total valid votes		71,950		
Registered electors		93,950		▲6.27
INC(I) gain from INC		Swing	▼2.66	

=== Assembly Election 1972 ===
1972 Maharashtra Legislative Assembly election : Katol
Party	Candidate	Votes	%	±%
INC	Shankarrao Daulatrao Gedam	35,663	53.81%	▲10.59
Independent	Motilram Gulabraoji Pawade	27,338	41.25%	New
Independent	Namdeo Atmaram Menghal	1,770	2.67%	New
ABJS	Shankarrao Shioram Kene	694	1.05%	New
RPI	Parashram Amrutwahane	662	1.00%	New
Margin of victory		8,325	12.56%	▲2.46
Turnout		68,681	77.69%	▼3.70
Total valid votes		66,274		
Registered electors		88,404		▲10.15
INC gain from Independent		Swing	▲0.49	

=== Assembly Election 1967 ===
1967 Maharashtra Legislative Assembly election : Katol
Party	Candidate	Votes	%	±%
Independent	Jiwanlal Sawangidas Chandak	33,661	53.32%	New
INC	Shankarrao Daulatrao Gedam	27,284	43.22%	▼4.09
CPI	V. A. Punje	1,103	1.75%	New
Independent	R. P. Goswami	748	1.18%	New
Margin of victory		6,377	10.10%	▲9.34
Turnout		67,031	83.52%	▲3.61
Total valid votes		63,133		
Registered electors		80,256		▲11.71
Independent gain from INC		Swing	▲6.01	

=== Assembly Election 1962 ===
1962 Maharashtra Legislative Assembly election : Katol
Party	Candidate	Votes	%	±%
INC	Shankarrao Daulatrao Gedam	25,511	47.31%	▼15.55
Independent	Jiwanlal Sawangidas Chandak	25,101	46.55%	New
Independent	Shiwaji Warluji Bhagat	1,704	3.16%	New
Independent	Murlidhar Bawako Patole	1,301	2.41%	New
Margin of victory		410	0.76%	▼24.96
Turnout		57,334	79.81%	▲2.54
Total valid votes		53,924		
Registered electors		71,842		▲4.64
INC hold		Swing	▼15.55	

=== Assembly Election 1957 ===
1957 Bombay State Legislative Assembly election : Katol
Party	Candidate	Votes	%	±%
INC	Shankarrao Daulatrao Gedam	31,297	62.86%	▼19.45
Independent	Deshmukh Nilkanthrao Alias Kalibabu Hanumantrao	18,490	37.14%	New
Margin of victory		12,807	25.72%	▼44.50
Turnout		49,787	72.52%	▲5.96
Total valid votes		49,787		
Registered electors		68,656		▲32.08
INC hold		Swing	▼19.45	

=== Assembly Election 1952 ===
1952 Madhya Pradesh Legislative Assembly election : Katol
Party	Candidate	Votes	%	±%
INC	Shankarrao Daulatrao Gedam	28,475	82.31%	New
SCF	Sardar Gurudayalsingh Gurugovindsingh Thorat	4,181	12.09%	New
ABJS	Shankarrao Shioram Kene	1,940	5.61%	New
Margin of victory		24,294	70.22%	
Turnout		34,596	66.56%	
Total valid votes		34,596		
Registered electors		51,979		
INC win (new seat)				

== See also ==
- Katol
- List of constituencies of Maharashtra Vidhan Sabha
