= Param Singh =

Param Singh may refer to:

- Param Singh (actor) (born 1988), Indian actor
- Param Singh (consultant) (active from 2011), British entrepreneur and community activist
- Param Bir Singh, Indian former police officer, former Police Commissioner of Mumbai and Director General of the Maharashtra Home Guard, a fugitive from extortion charges
