= Sachin Vaze =

Police Officer

- Born: Sachin Hindurao Vaze; 22 February 1972 (age 54); Kolhapur, Maharashtra, India
- Occupation: Police officer
- Organization: Mumbai Police
- Political party: Shiv Sena
- Police career
- Department: Maharashtra Police
- Service years: 1990–2004; 2020–2021
- Rank: Assistant Police Inspector (API)

Sachin Hindurao Vaze (born 22 February 1972) is a former Indian police officer who served as an Assistant Police Inspector in Mumbai Police (under the Maharashtra Police). He was dismissed from service by Mumbai Police Commissioner under Article 311 (2) (b) without a departmental enquiry. He is currently in the custody of the National Investigation Agency for his involvement in the Antilia bomb scare and the murder of Mansukh Hiren. He was a member of Uddhav Thackeray Shiv Sena. Faction

Vaze was an "encounter specialist" within the Mumbai Encounter Squad; he was involved with extra judicial deaths of as many as 63 alleged criminals, while never being injured in any encounter. He was suspended for 17 years after he was arrested in the custodial death of Khwaja Yunus, but was granted bail and later reinstated in June 2017. He led the Raigad police team in the arrest of Republic TV editor-in-chief, Arnab Goswami. In March 2021, he was arrested again for his role and involvement in the Antilla Bomb Scare. After his arrest, he was suspended once again from police service. He was dismissed from his police position on 11 May 2021.

== Biography ==
Vaze was born on 22 February 1972 in Kolhapur, Maharashtra. He joined the State Police Service in 1990. He was first posted to the Naxal-affected area of Gadchiroli.

=== 'Encounters' squad ===
In 1992, Vaze was transferred to Thane City Police, where he quickly gained fame for detecting several significant cases. Rising in rank, he eventually headed the Special Squad of the Thane Police and began carrying out encounters in the city, allegedly killing over 60 criminals in the Mumbai-Thane area.This squad, formed around 1997 to address growing extortion demands and open violence, soon became associated with encounter killings.

Subsequently, Vaze was selected to work in the Mumbai Police elite Crime Intelligence Unit (CIU), and along with his mentor Pradeep Sharma, later was transferred to the Anti-Extortion Cell (AE Cell), where his first-ever encounter was recorded.

Vaze's career spanned 30 years, during which he became known for "encounter killings" of 63 alleged criminals, including notorious gangsters like Munna Nepali. Vaze also dealt with cases of counterfeit currency and was instrumental in dealing with cases involving film industry personalities.

In 2008, Vaze joined Shiv Sena, a political party in India. However he never renewed his membership so it later "expired".

=== Suspension and reinstatement ===
On 3 March 2004, Vaze and 14 other policemen were suspended on murder charges in the custodial death of Khwaja Yunus, a suspect in the 2002 Ghatkopar bombing case. Vaze subsequently resigned from the police in November 2007 after requests for his reinstatement were rejected by the Maharashtra Government.

On 6 June 2020, Vaze's suspension was revoked by the Maharashtra government led by Uddhav Thackeray, and he was reinstated by Mumbai Police amid a police staff shortage at the height of the COVID-19 pandemic in Maharashtra. Nationalist Congress Party President Sharad Pawar said that neither Thackeray nor the state home minister Anil Deshmukh were responsible for the reinstatement.

In a press conference, Maharashtra ex-CM Devendra Fadnavis claimed that when he was Chief Minister of Maharashtra in 2018, Shiv Sena asked him to reinstate Vaze, which he disposed after consulting the state Advocate General.

=== Technology crime ===
Vaze is also known for his technology and cyber skills. Frequently seen with modern electronics in his hands and pockets, Vaze is known to have solved many serious cybercrimes. He is also believed to have established cellphone interception units and email tracking units of Mumbai Police. Vaze came into the limelight in 1997 when he detected international credit card fraud, which was the first time that a gang of such swindlers was arrested in Asia. Vaze continued this effort in Mumbai in 2001. There was conjecture that Vaze was framed in the Khwaja Yunus murder case. Vaze resigned in 2007.

Vaze also released a mobile application called MobiCID. In short order, MobiCID gained the attention of various media sectors.

== 2021 Antilia bomb scare case ==
On 25 February 2021, a Mahindra Scorpio SUV with fake license plates and around 20 explosive gelatin sticks was parked outside Mumbai businessman Mukesh Ambani's residence Antilia. Vaze was the first investigating officer in the bomb-scare case. The presumed car owner, Mansukh Hiren, who had filed a police complaint about the SUV being stolen, was later found dead in a creek near Thane on 5 March 2021. Three days before his death, Hiren had written a letter accusing the police of harassment. The leader of opposition of Maharashtra, Devendra Fadnavis demanded the arrest of Vaze for Hiren's alleged murder. Fadnavis claimed that Hiren's wife suspected that Vaze killed her husband.

Vaze applied for interim relief, but was rejected by the Sessions court in Thane. After over 12 hours of questioning, he was arrested by National Investigation Agency on 13 March for his involvement in placing the explosives-laden vehicle near Carmichael Road on 25 February. The NIA searched Vaze's office, seizing documents, electronic devices, and a Mercedes vehicle being used by Vaze, which contained ₹500,000 cash, a cash-counting machine and the original license plates of the Scorpio found earlier near Antilia. Assistant Sub-Inspector of Police Sunil Toke claimed that Vaze drove the seized Mercedes car into the Commissionerate of Police. An Assistant Police Inspector Riyazuddin Kazi was investigated who had removed a Digital Video Recorder (DVR) of CCTVs from the housing society where Vaze lived in Thane. As part of reconstructing the sequence of events, Vaze was made to walk near the spot where the SUV was found.

In a 21 March 2021 statement, the Maharashtra anti-terrorism squad named Vaze as the prime suspect in Mansukh Hiran's murder case. ATS has arrested cricket bookie Naresh Ramniklal Ghor and police officer Vinayak Balasaheb Shinde, who worked with Vaze, for their involvement. Officer Shinde had allegedly asked Hiren to meet him at Ghodbunder Road. Shinde was a constable in the same crime branch unit where Vaze was posted, and was already serving a life sentence after being convicted in the fake encounter case of Lakhan Bhaiyya, but was out on furlough. On 11 May 2021, he was officially dismissed from the Mumbai police.

=== Extortion allegation ===
Vaze's supervisor, Param Bir Singh, who had worked closely with him, was removed from his post of Mumbai Police Commissioner. Singh claimed, in a detailed letter to the Maharashtra Chief Minister, that Vaze was involved in a scheme to collect ₹100 Crore from businesses in Mumbai per month as demanded by the Maharashtra home minister Anil Deshmukh. Deshmukh's office denied the claim and stated that Param Bir Singh made false allegations against him to save himself from legal action. Devendra Fadnavis claimed that Vaze and Param Bir Singh were just pawns in the hands of the current Maha Vikas Aghadi (a coalition of NCP, Shiv Sena and Indian National Congress) state government. Param Bir Singh asked the Supreme Court on 22 March for a CBI probe against Deshmukh, claiming interference by him in police investigations.

Mumbai-based newspaper Mid-day has learned from members of Indian Hotel and Restaurant Association (AHAR) that Vaze had started collecting money from December 2020. Vaze would call from his office inside the compound of the Commissioner of Police office to pay monthly amounts and if paid, he would ensure that Social Service Branch would not conduct any raids. It reported a source stating that "SSB carried out raids at hotels and bars and filed cases. The last SSB raid was in early February. After that, no raid was conducted as everybody agreed to pay the money to be able to operate."

=== Alleged wealth ===
He is alleged to own eight cars and a sports bike. His Thane apartment is said to be worth a crore rupees. His monthly salary has been about 70,000 Rs. per month.

== Books, publications, movies ==
While in service Vaze was instrumental in forming new rules, manuals, and directives for Maharashtra Police. After resigning from service Vaze participated in television debates, and published articles in newspapers and periodicals. He has also been publishing articles on cyber crime issues. He has been a researcher, advisor and contributor to various leading newspapers, TV channels as well as online portals. He was the creator of the first social networking portal in Marathi, laibhaari.com, a Marathi version of Facebook. The portal put on test run on 4 November 2010 and had a membership figure of more than 15,000 till it formally launched on 21 November 2010.

Vaze is the author of Jinkun Harleli Ladhaai (Winning and losing battle) in Marathi, an account of the 26/11 Mumbai attacks. He also wrote Sheena Bora - The Murder That Shook India, about the Sheena Bora murder case in Mumbai.

He has served as a source and advisor on books projects by Hussain Zaidi (Headley & I, My Name is Abu Salem, Byculla to Bangkok), Adrian Levy and Shirish Thorat (The Scout: The Definitive Account of David Headley and the Mumbai Attacks).

Vaze was portrayed by Pushkar Shrotri in the 2014 Indian Marathi-language crime-thriller film Rege.
