= Gondimohgaon =

Village in Maharashtra

Coordinates: 21.364715°N 78.707412°E

Gondimohgaon (Village ID 534921) is a village in the tahsil Katol, in Nagpur district, Maharashtra state, India. According to the 2011 census it has a population of 1359 living in 309 households.
