= Pradeep Sharma (police officer) =

Indian police officer and politician (born 1961)

Maharashtra Police
- In office 1983 – 2019 (Resign)

Personal details
- Born: 1 May 1961 Agra, India
- Spouse: Swikriti Sharma
- Children: Niketa and Ankita (daughters)
- Occupation: Police Inspector, Mumbai Encounter Squad

Pradeep Sharma (born 1961) is a former officer in the police force of Mumbai, India. Sharma attained notability as an "encounter specialist" with the Mumbai Encounter Squad and was involved with the deaths of as many as 312 criminals. On 31 August 2008 he was suspended from the Mumbai police on charges of corruption but was reinstated on 16 August 2017 after he was proven innocent of those charges. Sharma resigned from Mumbai police in July 2019 after a 35 year long career. He officially joined the ruling Shiv Sena party in Maharashtra on September 13, 2019 and contested from Nalasopara seat in the Maharashtra assembly polls but lost to Bahujan Vikash Aghadi's candidate Kshitij Hitendra Thakur by a margin of 43,729 votes.

== Biography and career ==
Sharma's family was originally from Agra in the Indian state of Uttar Pradesh before moving to the state of Maharashtra. He was born in Indian state of Uttar Pradesh and completed his education from primary to MSc in Dhule, Maharashtra. He joined the State Police Service in 1983 as a sub-inspector. He was first posted to the Mahim police station in Mumbai and was moved to the special branch in Juhu, Mumbai. Rising through the ranks, he went on to head the police stations in other suburbs of Mumbai, and became a senior Inspector in the crime intelligence unit of the Mumbai police. His career spanned 25 years, during which he earned fame for the successful "encounter killings" of as many as 312 criminals, including notorious crime bosses and terrorists belonging to the Lashkar-e-Taiba. He was one of the most famous officers of the Mumbai Encounter Squad.

Sharma arrested Iqbal Kaskar; brother of Global Terrorist Dawood Ibrahim in Mumbai on the charges of extortion.

== Dismissal and subsequent reinstatement ==
On 31 August 2008 the Maharashtra government dismissed Sharma for involvement and contacts with criminals. Police obtained telephonic interceptions of Sharma's conversations with criminals and about criminal activities while the Intelligence Bureau provided intelligence implicating Sharma in the activities of the Dawood Ibrahim gang. However, Sharma is amongst several officers of the encounter squad facing official inquiries. Sharma professed his innocence, described his dismissal as wrongful and accused the Chhota Rajan gang of framing him. Police and media sources speculate that Sharma may be targeted by the Chhota Rajan gang, and hence he has been granted police protection round-the-clock; although dismissed officers are not entitled to police protection. Several media sources have nicknamed him "Bombay's Dirty Harry."

However, on 7 May 2009, Sharma was reinstated to the Mumbai city force of the Maharashtra Police after a state justice tribunal set up to study the allegations rejected the corruption charges against him and ordered his instant reinstatement. After getting reinstated at Mumbai Police Headquarters, Sharma was transferred to the Thane Police Commissioner office on 23 August.

== Acquittal and subsequent conviction in encounter case ==
On 5 July 2013, a Mumbai court acquitted Sharma of all the charges in the 2006 Lakhan Bhaiyya encounter case.

On 19 March 2024, following an appeal by the prosecution and the deceased's brother, the Bombay High Court overturned the acquittal, calling it "perverse" and "unsustainable", and sentenced Sharma to life imprisonment.

Sharma got bail from the Supreme Court in May 2024.

== Antilia case: murder of Mansukh Hiren ==
Former Mumbai Police Commissioner Param Bir Singh met former encounter specialist police officer Pradeep Sharma after the death of businessman Mansukh Hiren, whose vehicle was found filled with explosives near the residence of industrialist Mukesh Ambani, according to the National Investigation Agency or NIA which is probing the case.

The probe agency learnt about the meeting during a statement by a Mumbai Police Crime Branch Assistant Commissioner of Police, officials said. The officer told NIA that encounter specialist Pradeep Sharma and Assistant Police Inspector Sachin Waze held meeting with Param Bir Singh on March 5, 2021, the day Thane-based businessman Mansukh Hiren was found dead in a creek in Mumbai. The officer said that he saw the two officers leaving Param Bir Singh's cabin when he was going to meet the latter along with the Deputy Commissioner of Police and Joint Commissioner of Police (Crime) after hearing the news of Mansukh Hiren's death

On the death of Mansukh Hiren, Parambir Singh is learned to have called the incident "unfortunate". "It was unfortunate that Mansukh committed suicide. Under pressure, he should not have given his life," according to the statement of the Assistant Police Commissioner's statement given to the NIA.

The NIA chargesheet points to Pradeep Sharma's role in the death of Mansukh Hiren. According to the chargesheet filed by the probe agency, accused Santosh Shelar had called Pradeep Sharma - using a SIM card provided by a bookie - after Mansukh Hiren was killed and told him that the "work had been done". Santosh Shelar was arrested in connection with the murder in June.

== In popular culture ==
- Mumbai Mafia: Police vs Underworld 2023 Netflix documentary focusing on, and featuring Pradeep Sharma.
- Rege, a Marathi film (2014) starring Mahesh Manjrekar as Pradeep Sharma; "Class of 83" role of Pramod Shukla is inspired by him.
- The book The Class of 83 by S. Hussain Zaidi, delves deep into the encounters conducted by Pradeep Sharma and others.
