= Rege =

- Film Poster
- Directed by: Abhijit Panse
- Written by: Pravin Tarde
- Produced by: Ashwini Darekar
- Starring: Mahesh Manjrekar; Pushkar Shrotri; Santosh Juvekar; Aroh Welankar; Viju Mane; Ramesh Pardesi; Pravin Tarde; Uday Sabnis; Nilesh Divekar
- Cinematography: Mahesh Limaye
- Edited by: Dinesh Poojary
- Music by: Avadhoot Gupte
- Production company: Ravi Jadhav Films
- Distributed by: Zee Studios
- Release date: 15 August 2014
- Running time: 111 minutes
- Country: India
- Language: Marathi
- Budget: ₹3 crore (US$310,000)
- Box office: ₹7.80 crore (US$820,000)

Rege (Marathi:‘रेगे’) "Surname", is a 2014 Marathi neo-noir film directed by Abhijit Panse. The film deals with the theme of kids getting involved in Crime. The film became a commercial and critical success in India. The direction and script style were inspired by the late 1990s to mid 2000s "Crime Encounter" film trend from Hindi cinema, which boasted films such as Satya, Shool, Company, and Ab Tak Chhappan.

== Plot ==
The film is shot in a non-chronological order, with the plot continuously moving back and forth in time.

The story starts a year in the past: A top cop Pradeep Sharma presents himself before the court in an unknown case.A college teen named Anirudha Rege (Aroh Welankar) slowly becomes engulfed in the criminal underworld when he crosses the path of a mysterious small-time gangster named "M Bhai". He is depressed by the fact that he has to become a doctor, just because his father is a famous doctor. When he first witnesses M Bhai's ability to get away with crime during a Hindu religious celebration, Rege becomes enamored by his power. He and his friend Pakya decide to join M Bhai's gang's activities, bullying citizens, bribing police, and spending time at brothels. Rege's father, a successful doctor and dean of a hospital, becomes suspicious of Rege's whereabouts, but Rege assures him that everything is fine.

Meanwhile, Inspector Pradeep Sharma, who is accused of laundering money to pay for expensive properties managed by Agrawal Industries, is an expert in encounters and strong-arms gangsters into bending to his whim. He crosses paths with M Bhai's goons when he crashes a wedding celebration, but M Bhai and his men escape just in time. Sharma and his right-hand man, Sachin Waze, uses their own men to track them down.

Rege's friends try to get him to run for secretary in elections, but this is stalled after another candidate uses his criminal relations to convince Rege to drop out. However, the opposing candidate realizes Rege's connections with M Bhai and he himself drops out instead. Rege tells his friends to go, and they start to become concerned with his entanglements with his gangster friends. M Bhai then takes Rege along with his men to have some "fun", however they instead go on a mission to kill off Agarawal (of Agarawal Industries) who manages Pradeep Sharma's properties. Back in the present, the Pradeep Sharma is jail and is in complete control of his case. His lieutenant Waze is now managing the show. He takes the builder lobby into confidence and tries to bribe the judges, public prosecutor, etc. On the other hand, his seniors are also fighting tooth and nail to convict Sharma in the case. They arrange for false witnesses and they also raise a lobby to influence the judge. Sachin Vaze is countering these moves by killing the false witnesses lobbying to change the judges.

Back in flashback we see Rege comes out of the vehicle and witnesses the murder of Agarwal builder. The others in gang vouch to kill him, but M bhai is against the idea and spares Rege. M Bhai drops his men off at Rege's farmhouse and tells Rege to go to the bar and forget everything that has happened. Rege is seen at the whore-house extremely drunk. He is picked up by Sharma's men and brought to the police station where he is interrogated and threatened with violence. Rege is extremely scared and repents for what he has done. However, Sharma comes to the station and reasons with Rege privately in congenial manner to spill everything that happened with M Bhai's gang. As Rege reveals the events, Sharma realizes M Bhai could still be at Rege's farmhouse. Sharma's men head over with Rege and capture M Bhai and his men, who are soon after executed in a crop field. Rege feels guilty and foolish as Sharma lets him go home. But in the climax, it is revealed that Sharma killed Rege just to complete his century (100) of encounters when Waze persuades him by telling him that,"Sachin Tendulkar had waited for a year to complete his century of centuries". The final scene shows Rege's mother crying in front of his pictures and "Happy Birthday" playing in background as Rege is killed on his birthday.

In the present day, Pradeep Sharma is under arrest for disobeying his police superiors orders and abusing his power. He is periodically interrogated and derided by a panel of chief inspectors. Sachin Vaze attempts to gain favors with lawyers, politicians and judges to appeal his case. He is eventually acquitted of all charges.

== Cast ==
- Mahesh Manjrekar as Pradeep Sharma
- Pushkar Shrotri as Sachin Vaze
- Santosh Juvekar as Mohanlal Yadav
- Aroh Welankar as Aniruddha Rege
- Viju Mane as D.K.Shetty
- Anant Jog as Commissioner
- Pravin Tarde as Inspector Chougule
- Uday Sabnis as Commissioner
- Suresh Vishwakarma as Chhaprya
- Ramesh Pardeshi as M Bhai
- Nilesh Divekar
- Avadhoot Gupte special appearance in song "Shitti wajali Gadi Suttali "
- Nandkishor Choughule as Local Corporator

== Critical reception ==
Almost all critics including Maharashtra Times gave Rege 4 stars and said that Rege is a film that is very Marathi in the foundation of its story and yet, it is a film that Marathi cinema hasn't seen before. They have also appreciated the supporting cast saying they have been justifiably cast.

== Box office ==
The film collected ₹1 crore (US$100,000) in first three days. Total Box Office Collection nearby 6 crore.
