= Shrikant Jichkar =

Indian politician (1954–2004)

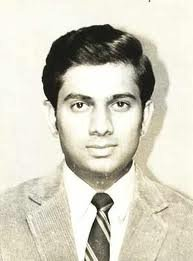

Member of Maharashtra Legislative Assembly
- In office 1980–1985
- Preceded by: Mukundrao Mankar
- Succeeded by: Sunil Shinde
- Constituency: Katol

Minister of State, Maharashtra
- In office 1986–1992

Member of Maharashtra Legislative Council
- In office 1986–1992

Member of Parliament, Rajya Sabha
- In office 5 July 1992 – 4 July 1998
- Constituency: Maharashtra

Personal details
- Born: 14 September 1954 Katol, Maharashtra, India
- Died: 2 June 2004 (aged 49) Nagpur, Maharashtra, India
- Cause of death: Car accident
- Party: Indian National Congress
- Spouse: Rajashri Jichkar
- Children: 2
- Known for: Obtaining 20 degrees across multiple fields; youngest MLA in India at age 26; held multiple ministerial portfolios

Shrikant Jichkar (14 September 1954 – 2 June 2004) was an Indian civil servant and politician. He earned 20 university degrees and was elected as the youngest MLA in the country at age 26. The title now belongs to Maithili Thakur, elected at 25 on November 14, 2025.

== Biography ==
Jichkar was born to a Marathi family in Katol, Maharashtra. His first degrees were in medicine (MBBS and MD from Nagpur). He later earned a Bachelor of Laws, Master of Laws in international law, Master of Business Administration, Doctor of Business Administration, Bachelor of Journalism, Doctor of Literature in Sanskrit, and ten Master of Arts degrees in public administration, sociology, economics, Sanskrit, history, English literature, philosophy, political science, ancient Indian history, culture & archaeology, and psychology. Most of his degrees were awarded with First Merit, and he received multiple gold medals. Between 1973 and 1990, he wrote 42 university examinations every summer and winter.

In 1978, he appeared for the Indian Civil Service examination conducted by Union Public Service Commission and was selected for the Indian Police Service. He later resigned and joined the Indian Administrative Service in 1980. Four months later, he resigned to contest his first general election and was elected to the Maharashtra Legislative Assembly, becoming the youngest MLA in India at 26. He later served as a minister, at one point holding 14 portfolios.

He was an MLA (1980–85), a member of the Maharashtra Legislative Council (1986–92), and a Rajya Sabha MP from Maharashtra (1992–98). He founded the Sàndipani School in Nagpur in 1992. He unsuccessfully contested the 1998 Lok Sabha from Bhandara-Gondiya and 2004 Lok Sabha from Ramtek.

== Death ==
Jichkar died in a car accident on 2 June 2004 near Kondhali, about 61 km from Nagpur. He was accompanied by a relative, Shriram Dhawad, who sustained multiple injuries.

== Philanthropy ==
He established Sāndipani School, Nagpur, in 1993 under the Shrikant Jichkar Foundation. He also contributed to the education and health of underprivileged children through his trust. After his death, his children continued these ventures under the Zero Gravity Foundation.
