= Antilia bomb scare =

2021 bomb scare in Mumbai

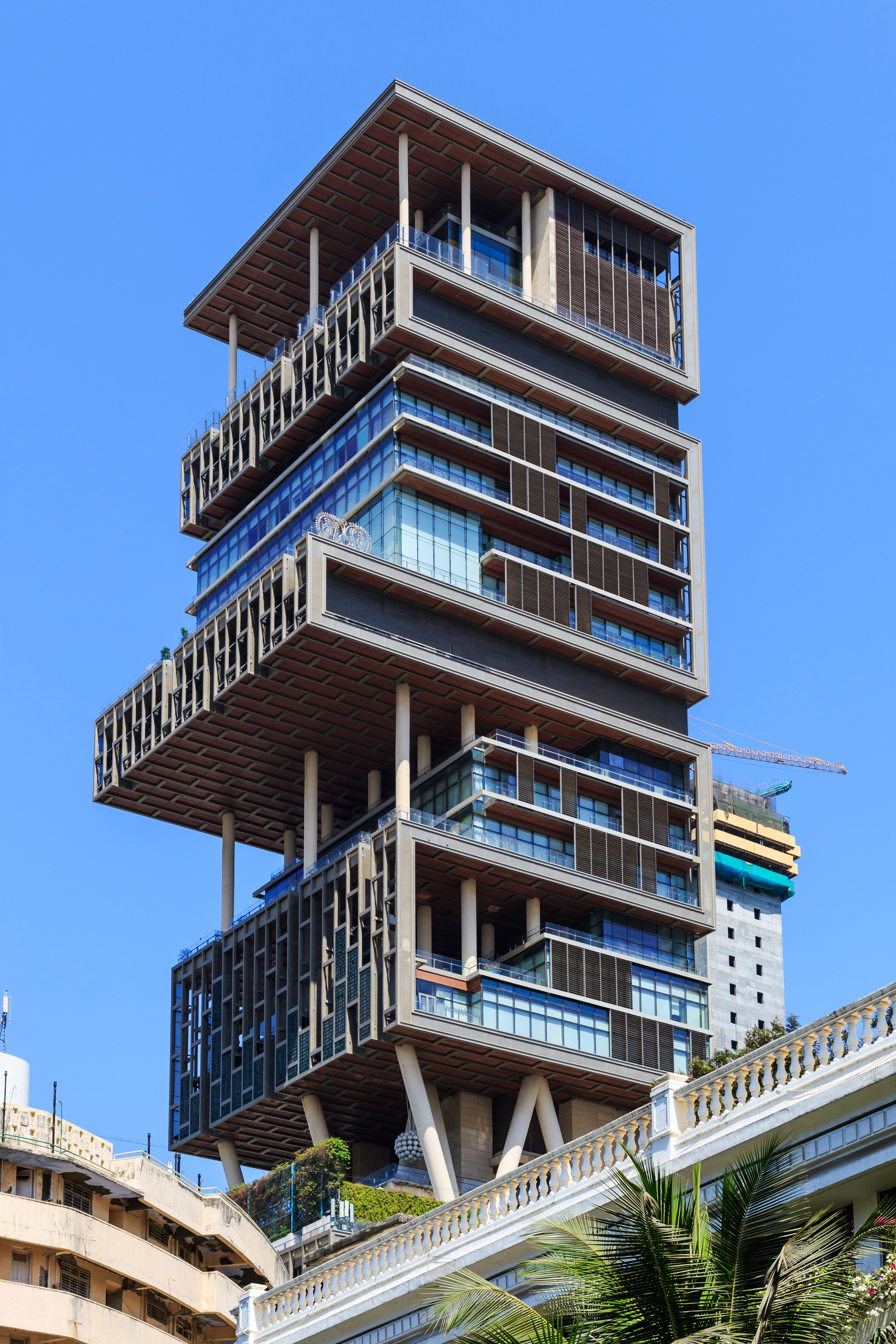

- Location: Near Mukesh Ambani's residence in Mumbai
- Date: February 25, 2021
- Attack type: Bomb threat
- Weapon: Sticks of gelignite

On 25 February 2021, a car containing 20 gelignite sticks was found outside the residence of Mukesh Ambani in Mumbai, leading to a bomb scare. A note found inside the vehicle, addressed to Mukesh and his wife Nita Ambani, said that the act was a prelude and threatened additional violence.

The bomb scare was notable for the chain of events which followed, forcing several high-profile officials to resign. The vehicle was traced to Mansukh Hiren, a car-décor shop owner from Thane, who had reported it stolen the previous week. A week later, Hiren was found dead in a Mumbai creek. Sachin Vaze, a Mumbai Police officer known to Hiren, was arrested for his involvement in placing the explosive-laden vehicle. As a result, Mumbai Commissioner of Police Param Bir Singh lost his post. Singh wrote a letter to the Chief Minister of Maharashtra alleging that Vaze was operating at the behest of Maharashtra Home Minister Anil Deshmukh, who was also forced to resign after the Bombay High Court directed the Central Bureau of Investigation to inquire into the letter's allegations.

== Threat ==
A green Mahindra Scorpio SUV was parked about 400 metres from Antilia at about 2:00 am on 25 February 2021. Since it was in a no-parking zone, Mumbai Traffic Police attached a wheel clamp to it in the morning and generated an electronic fine receipt.

Police were alerted by a call from the Antilia security manager. The vehicle had a false number plate, and the chassis and engine number were scratched. The gelatin sticks found in the vehicle (weighing 2.5 kg) were not assembled, and there was no detonator or battery. Although they were commercial-grade (not military-grade) explosives, they had the capacity to blow up the car and impact a radius of 350 metres.

Several other number plates were found in the car, some of which matched vehicles in the Ambanis' security team, and one identical to the car used by Nita Ambani. A letter was found next to the driver's seat in a bag with the Mumbai Indians logo. The printed letter, addressed to Mukesh and Nita Ambani, said that this was a "trailer"; the explosives would be assembled next time and preparations had been made for the next blast, intended to kill the whole family. The letter, a mixture of Hindi and English, had several spelling mistakes. The Jaish-Ul-Hind, a terrorist group formerly unknown to police, denied responsibility after a post in its name on Telegram claimed responsibility for parking the vehicle and seeking a ransom at a non-existent address for the cryptocurrency Monero.

== Death of Mansukh Hiren ==
Mansukh Hiren, the presumed owner of the car (who had filed a police complaint that the vehicle had been stolen), was later found dead. His body, which was floating in the Kalwa creek on the morning of 5 March, wore a face mask with five rolled-up handkerchiefs under it. His belongings (a phone, a gold chain, and a wallet) were not found. That day, opposition leader Devendra Fadnavis said that he had telephone records indicating that Assistant Police Inspector (API) Sachin Vaze of the Mumbai Police (the bomb-scare investigating officer until the previous day) had been in contact with Hiren in June and July 2020. Fadnavis considered this suspicious, and requested a National Investigation Agency (NIA) probe. Later on 5 March, the Hiren death and the bomb scare were transferred to the Mumbai Police Anti-Terrorism Squad.

Hiren's autopsy, performed at Hirenat Chhatrapati Shivaji Maharaj Hospital in Kalwa, did not specify the cause of death but reported multiple abrasions before he died. A diatom analysis suggested that Hiren was alive when he entered the creek. An accidental-death report was filed at the Mumbra police station, and Hiren's death was transferred to the Anti-Terrorism Squad on the basis of an order from the Maharashtra Home Department. The ATS collected the documents from the Mumbra police station, and registered a case of murder on 7 March based on the complaint by Hiren's wife.

Hiren's family said that he had been summoned to the Mumbai CP office nearly every day for questioning about the Mahindra Scorpio case, and he had submitted harassment complaints to the Mumbai and Thane police commissioners. They said that he was in his car décor shop in Thane when he received a call around 8 pm from a caller who identified himself as Tawde, posing as an investigator in the bomb-scare case. Hiren told his son that he was going to the Ghodbunder area in Thane to meet a Crime Branch official from the Kandivli unit. Two of Hiren's mobile phones were switched on and off 30 minutes and 10 km apart – one in Vasai-Virar, and the other in Tungareshwar. Police suspected that the killers may have done this to create false location indicators for Hiren. The phones were switched off at 10:30 pm. When Hiren could not be reached by the next morning, his family filed a missing report at the Naupada police station. After his body was recovered, his wife filed a first information report that she suspected Sachin Vaze of killing her husband. She noted the dates when Hiren and Vaze had met in her FIR, and said that Vaze had advised Hiren to submit a complaint to the Chief Minister about harassment by police and the media. Vaze asked him to have himself arrested, and Hiren had spoken to a lawyer about anticipatory bail.

After Vaze's name arose in connection with Hiren's death, he was transferred on 10 March from the Mumbai Crime Branch to the Citizen Facilitation Centre at Mumbai Police Headquarters; the bomb-scare case was transferred to Assistant Commissioner of Police (ACP) Nitin Alakhnure.

In a 21 March statement, the Maharashtra Anti-Terrorism Squad called Vaze the prime suspect in Hiren's death. On 13 March, after over 12 hours of questioning, Vaze had been arrested by the National Investigation Agency for his involvement in placing the explosive-laden vehicle near Antilia.

== Extortion allegation ==
Vaze's supervisor, Param Bir Singh (who had worked closely with him), was removed from his post as Mumbai police commissioner. In a detailed letter to the Maharashtra Chief Minister, Singh claimed that Maharashtra home minister Anil Deshmukh had ordered Vaze to collect ₹100 crore (US$10 million) per month from Mumbai businesses. Deshmukh's office denied the claim, saying that Singh made false allegations against the minister to save himself from legal action. According to opposition leader Devendra Fadnavis, Vaze and Singh were pawns of the Maha Vikas Aghadi (a coalition of the NCP, Shiv Sena and Indian National Congress) state government. Singh asked the Supreme Court on 22 March for a CBI probe of Deshmukh, claiming that Deshmukh interfered in police investigations.

The Mumbai-based newspaper Mid-Day learned from members of the Indian Hotel and Restaurant Association (AHAR) that Vaze had begun collecting money in December 2020. He would call from his office in the Commissioner of Police compound for monthly amounts and, if paid, would ensure that the Social Service Branch would not conduct raids. Mid-Day reported that a source said, "SSB carried out raids at hotels and bars and filed cases against them. The last SSB raid was in early February. After that, no raid was conducted as everybody agreed to pay the money to be able to operate."

== Investigation ==
The Mumbai Police formed over 10 teams to investigate the bomb scare. Crime Branch officials investigated details of the vehicle to identify its owner, and scanned closed-circuit televisions in the area. Anti-Terrorism Squad officials investigated a possible terror angle. The person sitting in the Scorpio could not be identified, since he was wearing a mask.

CCTV footage showed a white Toyota Innova following the Scorpio from Thane to Carmichael Road. Analysis of CCTV footage along the route taken by the two cars showed them driving separately, crossing the Mulund toll post, meeting at Priyadarshini Junction in Kurla, and proceeding towards Byculla. The vehicles turned right at Khada Parsi junction and proceeded to Carmichael Road. The driver of the Scorpio parked it at 2:18 am near Antilia (where it was last seen), and left in the Innova. The Innova (which also had a fake registration number) was seen exiting Mumbai and entering Thane, where its trail was lost.

After a Telegram post from the Jaish-Ul-Hind claiming responsibility, police used a private agency to track the mobile phone from which the message was sent. When the agency said that the phone was operated in (or near) Tihar Jail, the Delhi Police Special Cell seized a phone and interrogated a terrorist from the now-dormant Indian Mujahideen who was in the jail. The Mumbai Police checked the address of the cryptocurrency Monero (which was provided in the message), and found the address non-existent. Later, the Jaish-Ul-Hind denied responsibility for the post, and said it was a fake message.

The gelatin sticks were manufactured by Solar Industries, a Nagpur-based company who told police that they had no way to ascertain the buyer's identity. The Forensic science laboratory (FSL) at Kalina in Mumbai conducted a forensic analysis and found ammonium nitrate in the sticks, but the explosive was capable of only a low-intensity blast and could not cause major damage.

=== Handling of the SUV ===
Police found that the Scorpio had a number plate registered to Reliance Industries, but the vehicle with that number was a Jaguar Land Rover. Since the chassis and engine number were scratched, police contacted Wadhwa Motors Cars & Finance (whose name and number were written on the vehicle's rear glass). The real registration number was found to be MH02 AY 2815, and it was registered at the Thane RTO in 2007 by Sam Peter Newton. Newton led them to Mansukh Hiren, who identified the vehicle by its seat covers and a Ganesha idol. According to Hiren's statements to the Crime Branch, Newton (whom he had known since 2016) brought the vehicle to his car décor shop to have it fitted with accessories. Newton was unable to pay the bill, and allowed Hiren to use the car until he could pay. Hiren gave the vehicle to Sachin Vaze (a regular client) who used it for four months beginning in November 2020. Vaze returned the vehicle on 5 February 2021, saying that the steering wheel was stiff.

Hiren had the car until 16 February, when he parked it on the Eastern Express Highway after the steering wheel jammed. When he went to pick it up the following day, the car was missing. Hiren filed a complaint in the Vikhroli police station in which he said that the car belonged to his friend, Dr. Sam Newton. The Vikhroli police were unable to trace it during that time. Hiren said that he had recently driven it on only four or five occasions, because he wanted to sell it. Investigation of the vehicle when it was found near Antilia found no forced entry, and police suspected that it may have been stolen with a duplicate key.

The ATS said that, based on CCTV footage near the Chhatrapati Shivaji Terminus railway station, Hiren met Vaze for 10 minutes after parking the car. According to the NIA, the car was later picked up by Vaze's driver at his instructions from where Hiren had parked it. The driver then parked it at Vaze's residence in Thane. The driver drove it to police headquarters on 19 February and returned it to Vaze's residence the following day, where it remained until 24 February (when the driver went to Antilia).

After Vaze's arrest, the NIA searched his office and seized documents, electronic devices, and a Mercedes vehicle used by Vaze which contained ₹5 lakh (500,000) in cash, a cash-counting machine and the original license plates of the Scorpio found earlier near Antilia. Assistant Sub-Inspector of Police Sunil Toke said that Vaze drove the seized Mercedes to Police Commissioner of Mumbai headquarters. Assistant Police Inspector Riyazuddin Kazi, who removed a CCTV digital video recorder from Vaze's residence in Thane, was investigated. To reconstruct the sequence of events, Vaze was made to walk near where the SUV was found.

Then Home Minister Anil Deshmukh was arrested later by Enforcement Directorate in a case of money laundering. Also, retired police officer Pradeep Sharma; known as encounter specialist came to be arrested by NIA on charges of providing funds to kill Mansukh Hiren. Former cop Pradeep Sharma was paid cash to kill Mansukh Hiran: CBI Sunil Mane; senior inspector of Crime Branch Unit 11 in Mumbai came to be arrested on the charge of killing Mansukh Hiren. Antilia bomb scare case: Sunil Mane dismissed from Mumbai Police

== Arrests ==
After more than 12 hours of questioning, Vaze was arrested by the National Investigation Agency on 13 March 2021 for his involvement in placing the explosive-laden vehicle near Antilia. On 21 March, the ATS arrested cricket bookie Naresh Ramniklal Gor and police officer Vinayak Balasaheb Shinde (who worked with Vaze) for their involvement in Mansukh Hiren's murder. According to the ATS, Shinde posed as Tawde and asked Hiren to meet him on Ghodbunder Road on the day that Hiren went missing. Another ATS team apprehended a man from Gujarat who supplied SIM cards obtained with false documents to Gor, who provided five SIM cards to Vaze and Shinde. The NIA arrested Riyazuddin Kazi, who assisted Vaze in the Antilia bomb case and destroyed evidence in the Hiren murder case, on 11 April.

Cricket bookie Naresh Gaur was arrested in March 2021 in connection with the Antilia bomb scare case, facing charges related to procuring SIM cards allegedly used by other accused. A special NIA court granted Gaur bail in November 2021, noting no direct contact or connection with dismissed police officer Sachin Waze was evident from the record, and that Gaur had acted per his employer's directions. The National Investigation Agency challenged the bail order, arguing Gaur was aware the SIM cards would be used for criminal offences. The Bombay High Court later set aside the NIA court's stay on its own bail order, clearing the way for Gaur's release. Accepting arguments made by Gaur’s lawyer, Aniket Nikam, the court said, “Nothing is on record to show that the accused has ever contacted the accused Sachin Waze. He has no direct connection or contact with the accused Sachin Waze. No CDR reflects to that effect. He only handed over the SIM card to accused Vinayak Shinde,” the court said. It said Gaur had acted as per his employer’s directions.
