= Ravindranath Angre =

Indian police officer (born 1956)

Ravindranath Angre "Encounter specialist"
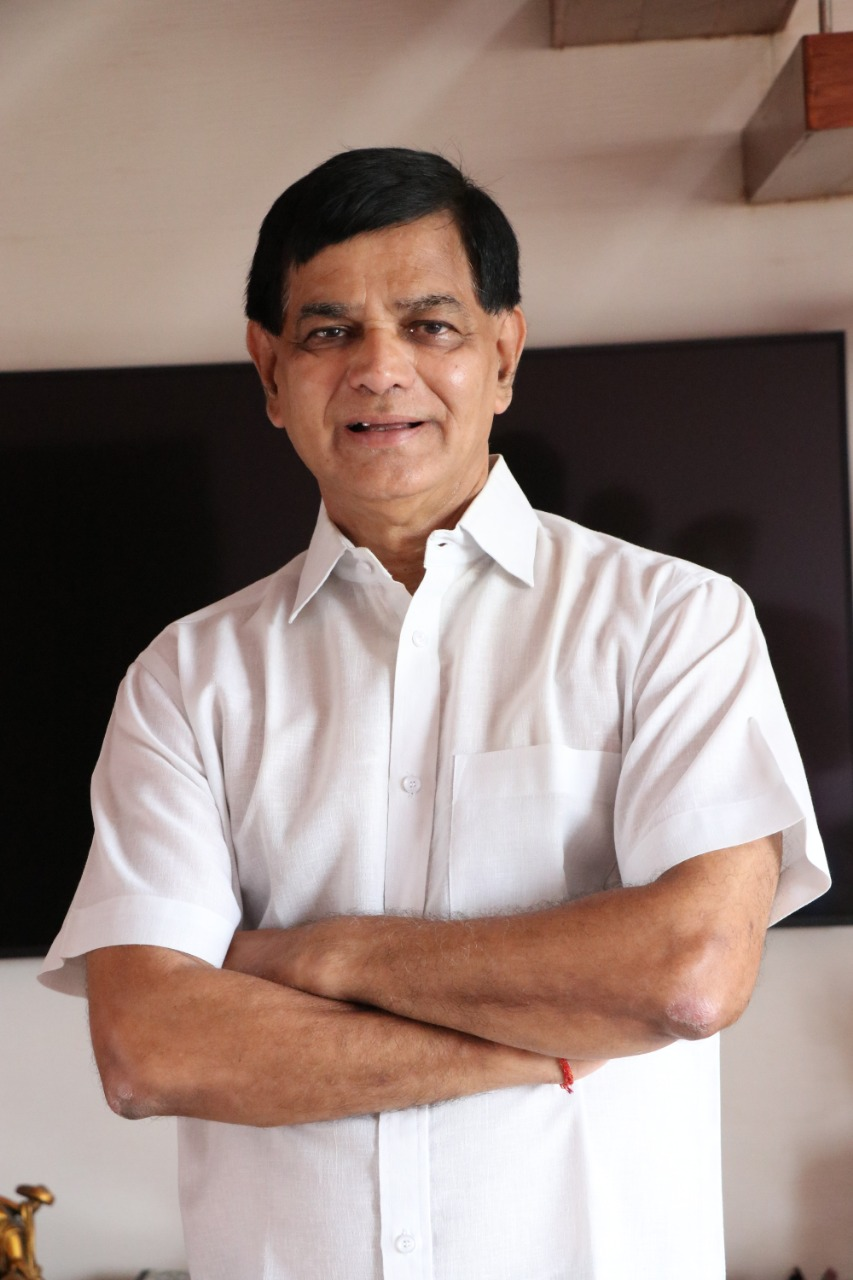
- Born: 8 July 1956 (age 70); Mumbai, India
- Education: Mumbai University
- Occupation: Former police officer
- Known for: Extrajudicial killings of 54 suspected criminals, large arms seizure in 1998
- Police career
- Country: Maharashtra Police Department
- Service years: 1983–present (reinstated after 2011 acquittal)
- Rank: Sub-Inspector (joined in 1983)
- Other work: Joined Samarth Thane (NGO) during suspension; Joined Indian National Congress (November 2018)

Ravindranath Angre (born 8 July 1956) is a former police officer in the Maharashtra Police Department. He is known for his extrajudicial killings of 54 criminals, mostly linked to organized crime. These killings have led him to be characterized as an "encounter specialist". He joined the Congress in November 2018.

== Background and career ==
Ravindranath Angre was born on 8 July 1956 in Mumbai. After completing his schooling, he received a B.A from Mumbai University. Once he completed his education he joined the police force as a Sub-Inspector in 1983. His batchmates include officers like Vijay Salaskar, Pradeep Sharma, Praful Bhosle and Vinayak Saude. Angre has shot dead 33 notorious gangsters in Mumbai, and 21 notorious criminals in Thane district. His special achievements include gunning down Manchekar Gang, including Gang leader Suresh Manchekar, breaking the back of Amar Naik Gang in Mumbai and being involved in the largest arms seizure in Maharashtra Police records until date. This arms seizure took place in 1998 and included 11 Type 56 (Chinese copy of AK 47) rifles, more than 2,000 rounds of ammunition and around 200 grenades.

== Setback ==
He was accused of extortion in 2008 by a Thane-based builder. He was acquitted of all charges by the Thane District Sessions Court in 2011. Until his reinstatement, he joined an NGO named Samarth Thane to address and resolve civic issues. After reinstatement he was transferred Gadchiroli District of Maharashtra which has had trouble with Naxalite insurgency. He was assigned to the control room and not to field duty. In November 2018, he left the Bhartiya Janata Party and formally joined the Indian National Congress.
