= Param Bir Singh =

Former Commissioner of Mumbai Police

- Occupation: Police Officer
Param Bir Singh
- Police career
- Department: Maharashtra Police
- Service years: 1988–2020
- Rank: Director General of Police

Param Bir Singh is a former Indian police officer of the 1988 Indian Police Service (IPS) batch. He served as the Police Commissioner of Mumbai and the Director General (DG) of the Maharashtra Home Guard. Following the filing of extortion cases against him, he was untraceable, and was declared as absconding by a Mumbai Magistrate Court. Singh was suspended from his present position as the DG of Home Guard because of his absence, by the Government of Maharashtra.

== Early life ==
Param Bir Singh was born in Chandigarh to Hoshyar Singh, who was a civil servant. In 1983, Param Bir completed MA in sociology from Punjab University.

== Career ==
His previous posts include Police Commissioner of Mumbai, Director General (DG) of the Anti-Corruption Bureau (ACB), Police Commissioner of Thane, Superintendent of Police in Chandrapur and Bhandara, Deputy Commissioner of Police (Detection) in Mumbai, Additional Commissioner of Police in North-West Region in Mumbai, Additional Commissioner of Police in Anti-Terrorism Squad, and Additional Director General of Police (Law and Order).

He was the Additional Commissioner of the ATS, when the ATS investigated the 2008 Malegaon blasts case, and arrested the prime accused Sadhvi Pragya and Lt. Col. Prasad Purohit. In a 2025 interview investigative officer Mehboob Mujawar alleged that he had issued a directive to fabricate a saffron terror narrative in India and also arresting RSS Chief Shri Mohan Bhagwat. All accused were released by the High Court citing lack of evidence.

As ACP, he was part of the team that countered the terrorists in Oberoi Trident during the 26/11 Mumbai terror attacks of 2008.

As Police Commissioner of Thane, he busted the fake international call centre racket at Mira Road in which 6,500 US nationals were cheated. 772 employees were taken into custody from three bogus call centres.

Singh became Police Commissioner of Mumbai on 29 February 2020. He handled the cases of the TRP scam, the Anvay Naik suicide and the death of Sushant Singh Rajput. On 18 March 2021, the Maharashtra government removed Singh as commissioner in the aftermath of a security incident in which a parked car containing sticks of gelignite was discovered outside of the home of businessman Mukesh Ambani.

On March 20, 2021 Singh in an eight-page letter to Chief Minister Uddhav Thackeray alleged that then Home Minister Anil Deshmukh had asked then Assistant Police Inspector Sachin Waze "to collect ₹100 Crore every month from businesses based in Mumbai". Deshmukh resigned in April 2021, and was arrested in November 2021 by the Enforcement Directorate.

On 28 October 2021, a court in Maharashtra's Thane issued a non-bailable warrant against Singh in connection with a case of extortion. As per the then Maharashtra Home Minister Dilip Walse Patil, Singh went on leave from his post of DG Home Guards on May 5, 2021 citing ill health, and suggested he may have left the country. The state CID issued a lookout notice against Singh, and on November 17, the Mumbai Additional Chief Metropolitan Magistrate court declared Singh a proclaimed offender, a first for a Mumbai police commissioner. He was refused relief from arrest by the Supreme Court citing reasons that a relief from arrest cannot be granted unless and until the guilty party reveals their current location. Singh was suspended, and the state government initiated disciplinary action against him over lapses and irregularities including unauthorized absence, as Singh failed to return to duty after his leave on health grounds lapsed on July 29.

== Personal life ==
Singh is married to Savita Singh who is a law graduate and a director and partner in multiple companies.

Their son, Rohan Singh and daughter, Rainaa Singh, are lawyers.
