= Anil Deshmukh =

Indian politician (born 1950)

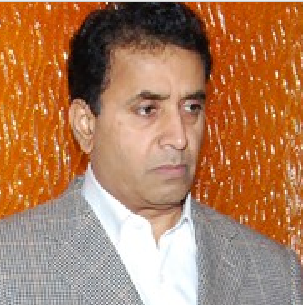
- Official portrait, 2019

Cabinet Minister, Government of Maharashtra
- In office 30 December 2019 – 5 April 2021
- Minister: Home Affairs
- Governor: Bhagat Singh Koshyari
- Chief Minister: Uddhav Thackeray
- Preceded by: Devendra Fadnavis
- Succeeded by: Dilip Walse-Patil

Member of Maharashtra Legislative Assembly
- In office 27 November 2019 – 26 November 2024
- Preceded by: Ashish Deshmukh
- Succeeded by: Charansing Thakur
- Constituency: Katol
- In office March 1995 – October 2014
- Preceded by: Sunil Shinde
- Succeeded by: Ashish Deshmukh
- Constituency: Katol

Minister of Food & Civil Supplies and Consumer Affairs Government of Maharashtra
- In office October 2009 – October 2014
- Chief Minister: Ashok Chavan; Prithviraj Chavan
- Succeeded by: Sambhaji Patil Nilangekar

Minister of Public Works Department Government of Maharashtra
- In office October 2004 – October 2009
- Chief Minister: Vilasrao Deshmukh

Minister of State for School Education, Information and Public Relations and Sports & Youth affairs Government of Maharashtra
- In office October 1999 – October 2004
- Chief Minister: Vilasrao Deshmukh

Minister of State for Education and Culture Government of Maharashtra
- In office March 1995 – October 1999
- Chief Minister: Manohar Joshi

Personal details
- Born: 9 May 1950 (age 76) Wadvihira, Narkhed, Nagpur district
- Party: Nationalist Congress Party (Sharadchandra Pawar) (2024-present)
- Education: Dr. Panjabrao Deshmukh Krishi Vidyapeeth

Anil Vasantrao Deshmukh (born 9 May 1950) is an Indian politician from the state of Maharashtra. He is a senior leader of the Nationalist Congress Party (Sharadchandra Pawar). Deshmukh served as the Minister for Home Affairs in Government of Maharashtra between 2019 and 2021. Deshmukh resigned in 2021 as the Home Minister of Maharashtra due to allegations of money laundering and other charges by Param Bir Singh. He was arrested by ED and was kept in custody for 1 year before being released by a court order.

Deshmukh has been a member of 9th, 10th, 11th, 12th and 14th Maharashtra Legislative Assembly, representing Katol (Vidhan Sabha constituency). He had previously served as Minister of Food & Civil supplies and Consumer affairs, Minister of Public Works Department, Minister of State for School Education, Information and Public Relations, Minister of State for Sports & Youth affairs and Minister of State for Education and Culture in the Government of Maharashtra.

== Early life and family ==
Deshmukh hails from the village of Vad Vihira near Katol in Nagpur district. He attended Katol High school. Later, he attended the College of Agriculture, Nagpur and received a Master of Science degree in Agriculture awarded by Dr. Panjabrao Deshmukh Krishi Vidyapeeth. (Note: The College of Agriculture has now shifted affiliation to Dr.Panjabrao Deshmukh Krishi Vidyapeeth (Agricultural University), Akola.) He has two sons named Salil Deshmukh and Hrishikesh Deshmukh.

Anil Deshmukh is also Founder of Nagpur Institute Of Technology (NIT) located at Katol Road, Nagpur.

== Political career ==
Deshmukh served as the chairman of Nagpur Zilla Parishad during initial years of his political career. He first got elected to Maharashtra state assembly in 1995 from Katol as an independent candidate. He represented that constituency until 2014. He served as Minister of State in the BJP–Shiv Sena coalition government in 1995. His portfolios in that government included Education, and Culture. He later joined the Nationalist Congress Party, a party formed in 1999. When the NCP–Congress alliance came to power in Maharashtra in 1999, he initially served as Minister of State for School Education, Information and Public Relations, Sports & Youth Welfare. He was promoted as a Cabinet Minister in the state government. As a cabinet minister from 2001 to 2014, he was in-charge for the following departments:

- Excise, Food & Drugs, Maharashtra State (2001 to March 2004)
- Public Works (Public Undertakings), Maharashtra State (2004 to 2008)
- Food, Civil Supplies and Consumer Protection, Maharashtra State (2009 -2014)

Deshmukh lost the Katol seat to his nephew, Ashish Deshmukh in 2014 assembly elections. However, he regained the Katol seat as the NCP candidate in the 2019 Maharashtra assembly elections. Deshmukh was appointed Home Minister of Maharashtra when the MVA alliance of NCP, Shiv sena and Congress led by Chief Minister Uddhav Thackeray came to power in November 2019. In addition to his portfolio, Deshmukh is also the Guardian Minister of Gondia district.

=== From 1995 to 1999 ===
Anil Deshmukh held the portfolio of Minister of State for School Education, Higher & Technical Education, Cultural Affairs in the government of Maharashtra from 1995 to 1999.

As the Minister of State for School Education, he started the initiative to regulate the burgeoning private coaching classes, where the teachers employed by schools simultaneously ran private coaching institutions.

Deshmukh is said to have been involved in setting up the Maharashtra Bhushan award, the highest civilian honour in the state of Maharashtra. Famous personalities including Purushottam Laxman Deshpande, Lata Mangeshkar and Sunil Gavaskar have received this award since.

He was active in the drive to reduce the weight of bags carried by students enrolled in schools affiliated with Maharashtra State Board of Secondary and Higher Secondary Education.

=== From 1999 to 2001 ===
Deshmukh held the portfolio of Minister of State for School Education, Information and Public Relations, Sports & Youth Welfare in the Maharashtra Government during this period.

Under his charge, the construction of India's second-largest air-conditioned indoor sports stadium began in Nagpur.

=== From 2001 to 2004 ===
Deshmukh was a Cabinet Minister in the Maharashtra government during this period and held the State Excise, Food & Drugs portfolio.

During his tenure, the Maharashtra Legislative Assembly passed the law to ban gutka, a form of chewing tobacco which contains carcinogens in the state.

=== 2004 to 2008 ===
During this period, Deshmukh was the Minister of Public Works (Public Undertakings) in the Maharashtra government.

He administered the department during the final few phases of the development of the Bandra–Worli Sea Link, a project which had already suffered delays of multiple years. The project was finally completed in 2009.

=== 2019 and later ===
Deshmukh took charge of the Home Ministry of Maharashtra in the MVA coalition government led by Uddhav Thackeray after the 2019 Maharashtra political crisis.

He proposed the establishment of a specialized treatment center for the police personnel infected during the COVID-19 pandemic.

As the Home Minister, he tabled the proposed Shakti Bill in the Maharashtra Legislative Assembly which sought to modify provisions pertaining to sexual offences against women and children. The bill was ultimately sent for review to a committee of the Legislative Assembly after an outcry from various women's rights groups and activists.

As a Home Minister, he introduced the ‘Self Balancing Electric Scooters’ (Segway) for Mumbai Police personnel that would help them while on patrolling duty.

He famously attended the complaint calls at the Pune city police control room on New Year's Eve and celebrated the same with police personnel.

During his tenure, the home ministry declared ₹5,000,000 ex gratia to the families of police personnel who lost their lives to COVID-19.

He also proffered one-rank promotion to fourteen police officers for their historic valor and courage during the 26/11 Mumbai Terror Attacks.

It is claimed that he was the first ever Home Minister of the state to visit the Regional Forensic Sciences Laboratory in Pune and spent time interacting with the staff and discussed ways to equip the Laboratory with the latest technology.

=== 2021 accusations and resignation as Home minister ===
Former commissioner of Mumbai Police Param Bir Singh, in a letter in March 2021 accused Deshmukh of bribery.

Deshmukh resigned from the post of the Home Minister of Maharashtra in the MVA coalition government led by CM Uddhav Thackeray after the Bombay high court directed the Central Bureau of Investigation to conduct a preliminary inquiry into allegations of corruption and misconduct leveled by former commissioner Param Bir Singh.

==== CBI and ED probe ====
Anil Deshmukh is currently under investigation by the Indian Central Bureau of Investigation and Enforcement Directorate, following accusations made by the former Mumbai Police commissioner Param Bir Singh. Deshmukh remained untraceable from July 2021 for a period of more than three months and failed to appear before enforcement directorate five times during that period. However, on 1 November 2021, he voluntarily came to the ED office in Mumbai after the Bombay High court on 30 October denied his plea to cancel enforcement directorate, and was formally arrested. The Bombay High court set aside the judicial custody and remanded Deshmukh into custody till 12 November.

The probe has been criticized by NCP chief, Sharad Pawar.

In January 2022, Anil Deshmukh filed for a bail plea as usual but was rejected by the Special Court and is currently lodged at the Arthur Jail.

Deshmukh dislocated his shoulder whilst being in judicial custody. His application to get the surgery to correct that in a privately run hospital rather than a government run facility has been opposed by ED. The judgement was pending in the case as of 2022.

== Ministerial positions held in Government of Maharashtra ==
SI No.	Year	Legislative Assembly	Constituency	Margin	Party	Post
1.	1995	9th	Katol		Independent	Minister of State for Education and Culture
2.	1999	10th	Katol		Nationalist Congress Party	Minister of State for School Education, Information and Public Relations and Sports & Youth affairs.
3.	2004	11th	Katol		Nationalist Congress Party	Minister of Public Works Department
4.	2009	12th	Katol		Nationalist Congress Party	Minister of Food & Civil supplies and Consumer Affairs
Lost the elections held in September 2014 to BJP's Ashish Deshmukh
5.	2019	14th	Katol		Nationalist Congress Party	Minister of Home Affairs

== See also ==
- 2021 Mukesh Ambani/Antilia bomb scare case
