= Katol =

- City
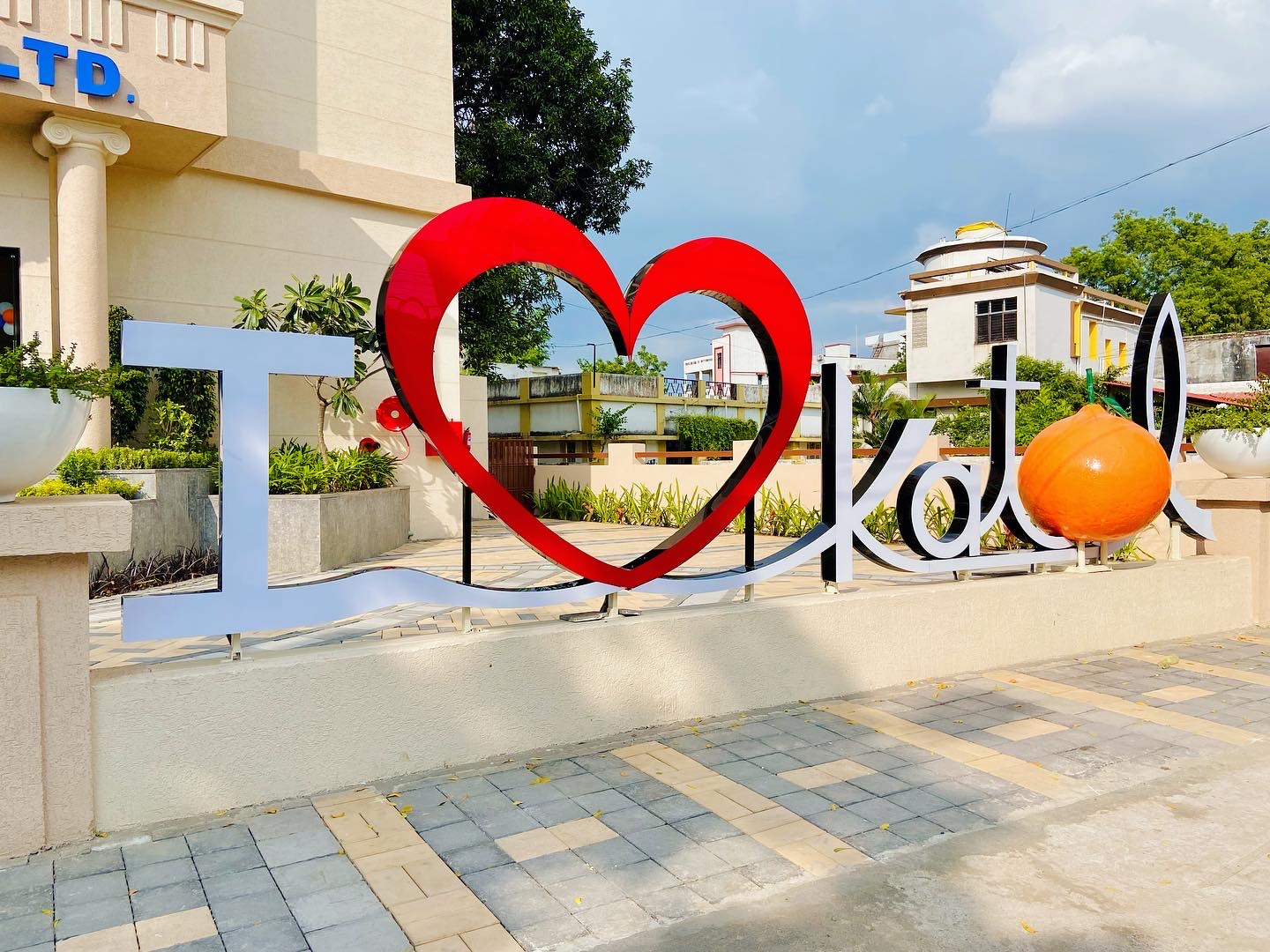
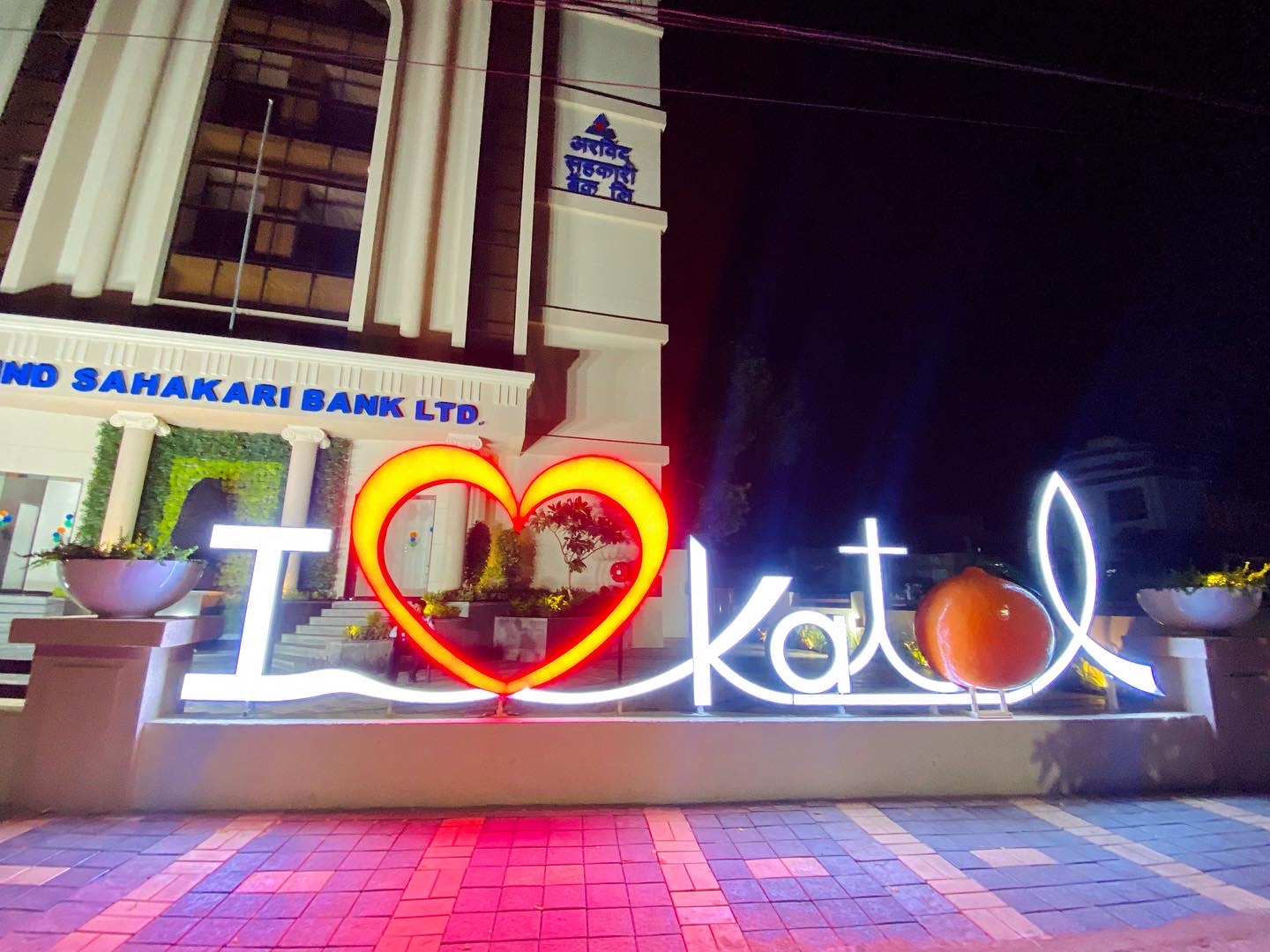
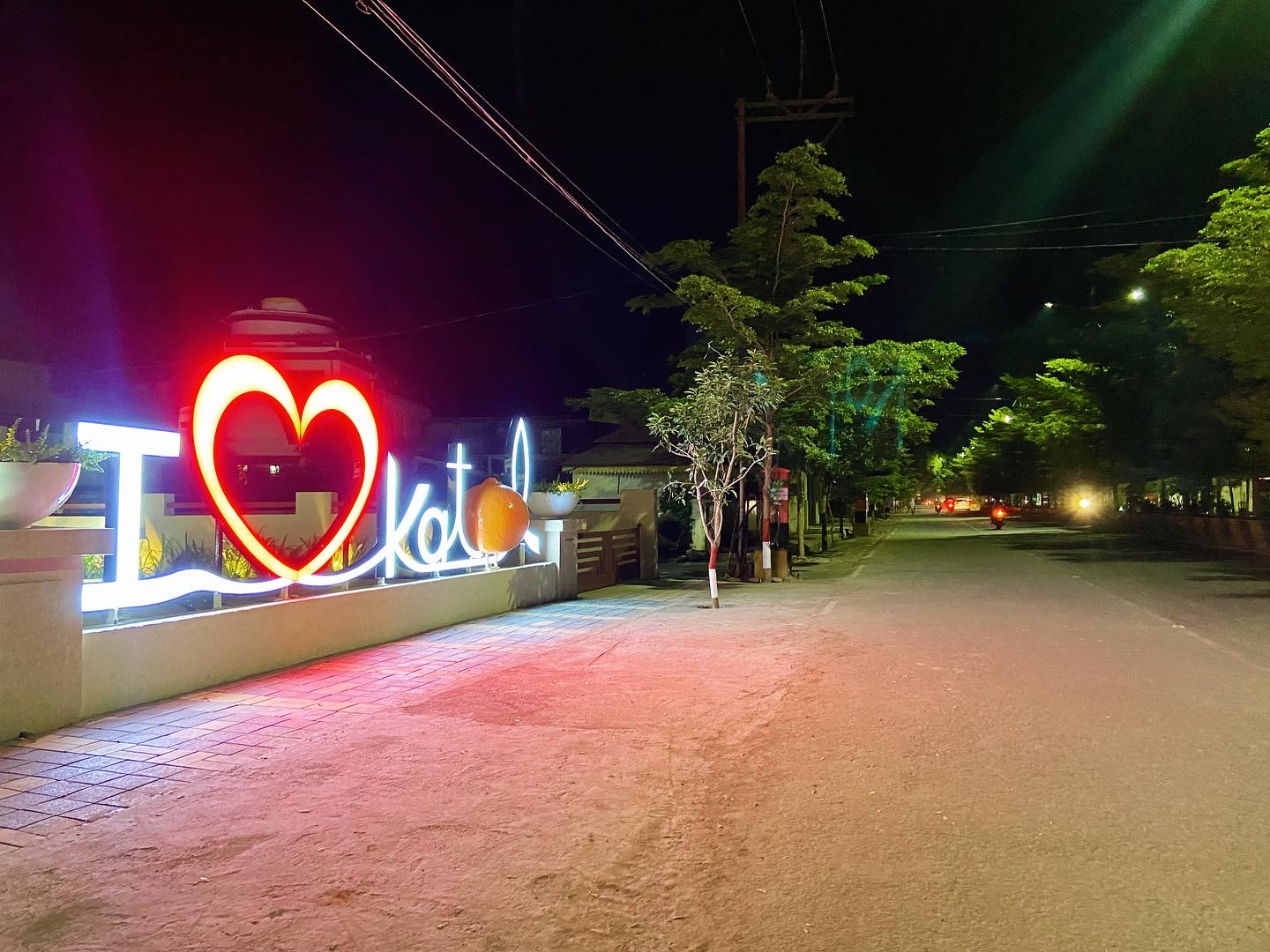
- Typography sign at Katol

- Location in Maharashtra, India Katol (India)
- Coordinates: 21.27°N 78.58°E
- Country: India
- State: Maharashtra
- District: Nagpur

Government
  - Type: Municipal Council
  - Body: Katol Municipal Council
- Elevation: 417 m (1,368 ft)

Population (2011)
  - Total: 43,267

Languages
  - Official: Marathi
- Time zone: UTC+5:30 (IST)
- Vehicle registration: MH40

Katol is a city and a municipal council in Nagpur district of Maharashtra state, India. It is the administrative headquarters of Katol taluka, one of the 14 talukas of this district. Being located in orange belt it is a major centre for orange trading.

== Mythology ==
In Dvapara Yuga, during the reign of Raja Chandrahasa, Katol's name was Kuntalapur. Katol is also mentioned in the Ashwamedh canto of the Mahabharat as Kuntalapur. Katol is the location of two of the Hemadpanthi temples, Maa Chandika and Maa Saraswati, which local tradition associates with the period of Rawan and to have been built in one night by his demons. The mud fort dates from the time of the Gond dynasty.

== Geography and climate ==
Katol is located at 21.27°N 78.58°E. It has an average elevation of 417 metres (1368 ft). Katol is approximately 56 km to the west of Nagpur, with which it is connected by a road of fair quality that also passes through the town of Kalmeshwar, 18 km from Nagpur. The town now includes the large adjoining village of Peth Budhwar, which lies on the Jam, a tributary of the Wardha River. The combined population of Katol and Peth Budhwar was 7040 in 1891 and 7313 in 1901, but as the town is the trade centre of a wide cotton-growing tract, it has grown considerably since the last census. The old town-site is crowded, lying in a hollow, but the recent trend of extension has been towards the higher ground on the southeast where the cotton factories stand.

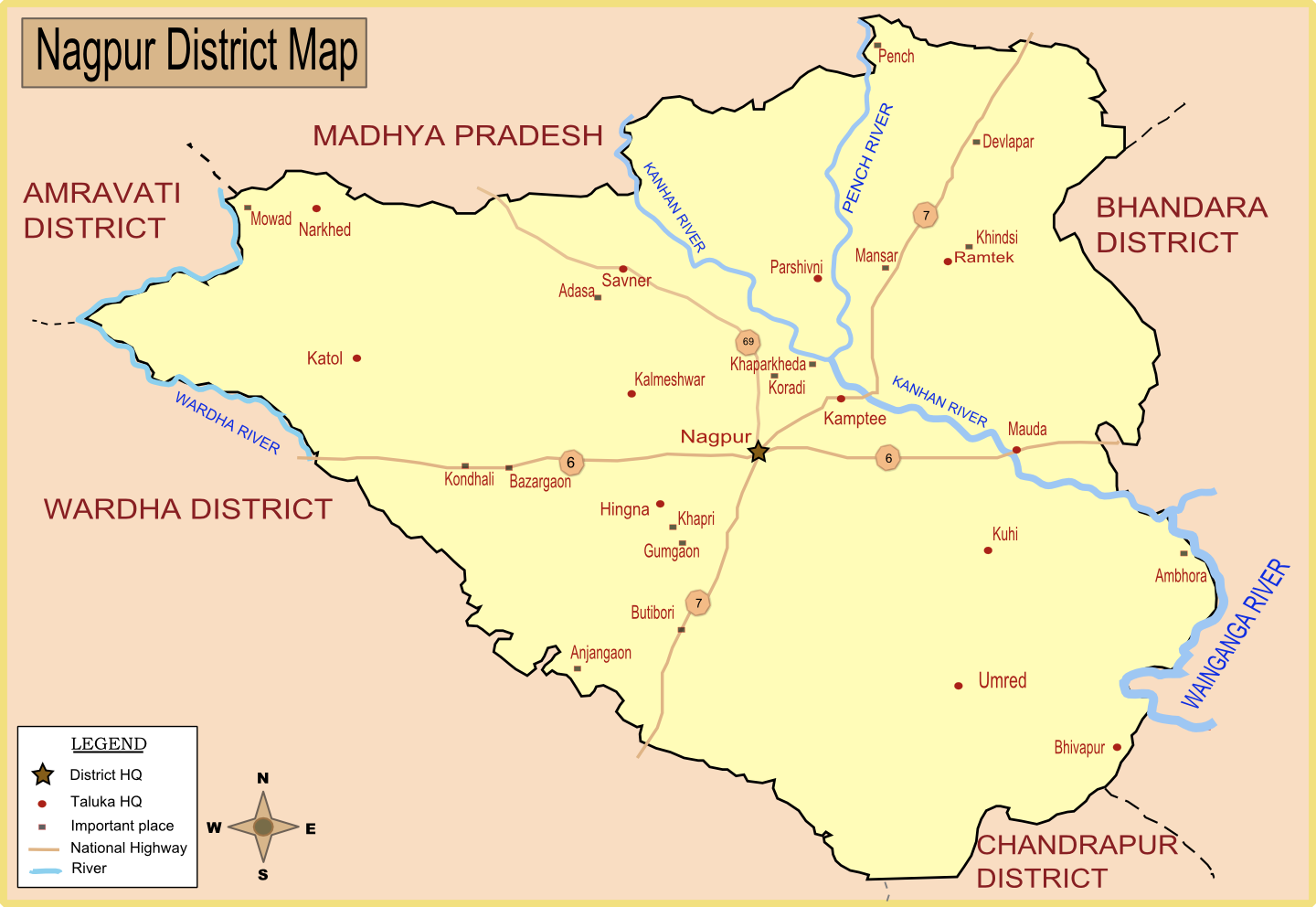
Map of Nagpur district with major towns(including Katol) and rivers.

Katol has a tropical wet and dry climate (Köppen climate classification) with dry conditions prevailing for most of the year.

== Demographics ==
As of 2011 Indian Census, Katol had a total population of 43,267, of which 22,064 were males and 21,203 were females. Population within the age group of 0 to 6 years was 4,174. The total number of literates in Katol was 35,231, which constituted 81.4% of the population with male literacy of 83.6% and female literacy of 79.2%. The effective literacy rate of 7+ population of Katol was 90.1%, of which male literacy rate was 92.8% and female literacy rate was 87.4%. The Scheduled Castes and Scheduled Tribes population was 6,086 and 3,425 respectively. Katol had 9866 households in 2011.

Year	Male	Female	Total Population	Change	Religion (%)							
Year	Male	Female	Total Population	Change	Hindu	Muslim	Christian	Sikhs	Buddhist	Jain	Other religions and persuasions	Religion not stated
2001	19304	18131	37435	-	85.009	7.074	0.075	0.174	6.996	0.646	0.013	0.013
2011	22064	21203	43267	15.579	85.021	6.832	0.173	0.300	7.022	0.455	0.005	0.192

== Administration ==
The Corporation of Katol.

The Corporation of Katol was established in 1919. Katol reached the first stage of modern municipal development in 1905 when it was designated as a Town-Fund area. For the first year its income was only Rs. 4761, but it has now risen to about Rs. 7176. Its prosperity depends chiefly on cotton trading, and in recent years most of the municipal income has for that reason been expended on a cotton market. This is a large enclosure of about 10 acres (40,000 m^{2}), securely fenced, and provided with a weighing shed, well, water trough, young shade trees, and an arc light.

== Economy ==
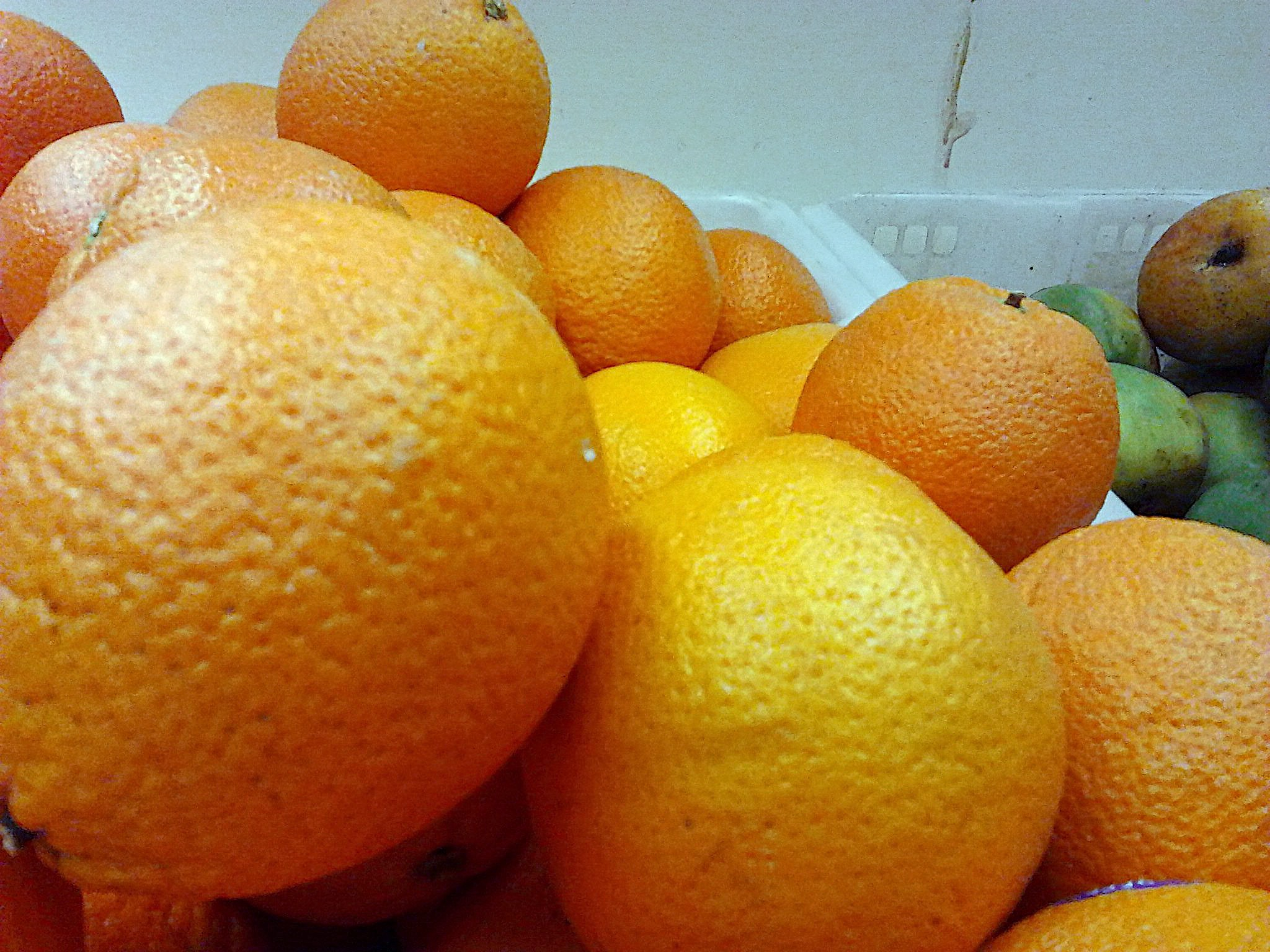
Indian hybrid Orange

The weekly market of Katol has long been important and is now attended by from 6000 to 8000 people. Commodities of all kinds are dealt in but the bazar is more especially important as being the second largest cattle - market in the town. In the month of Ashvin (October) the Saraswati fair (Navaratra) is held and is usually attended by about 20,000 people a day. The orchards of the town are, noted for their growth of fine & world-famous oranges.

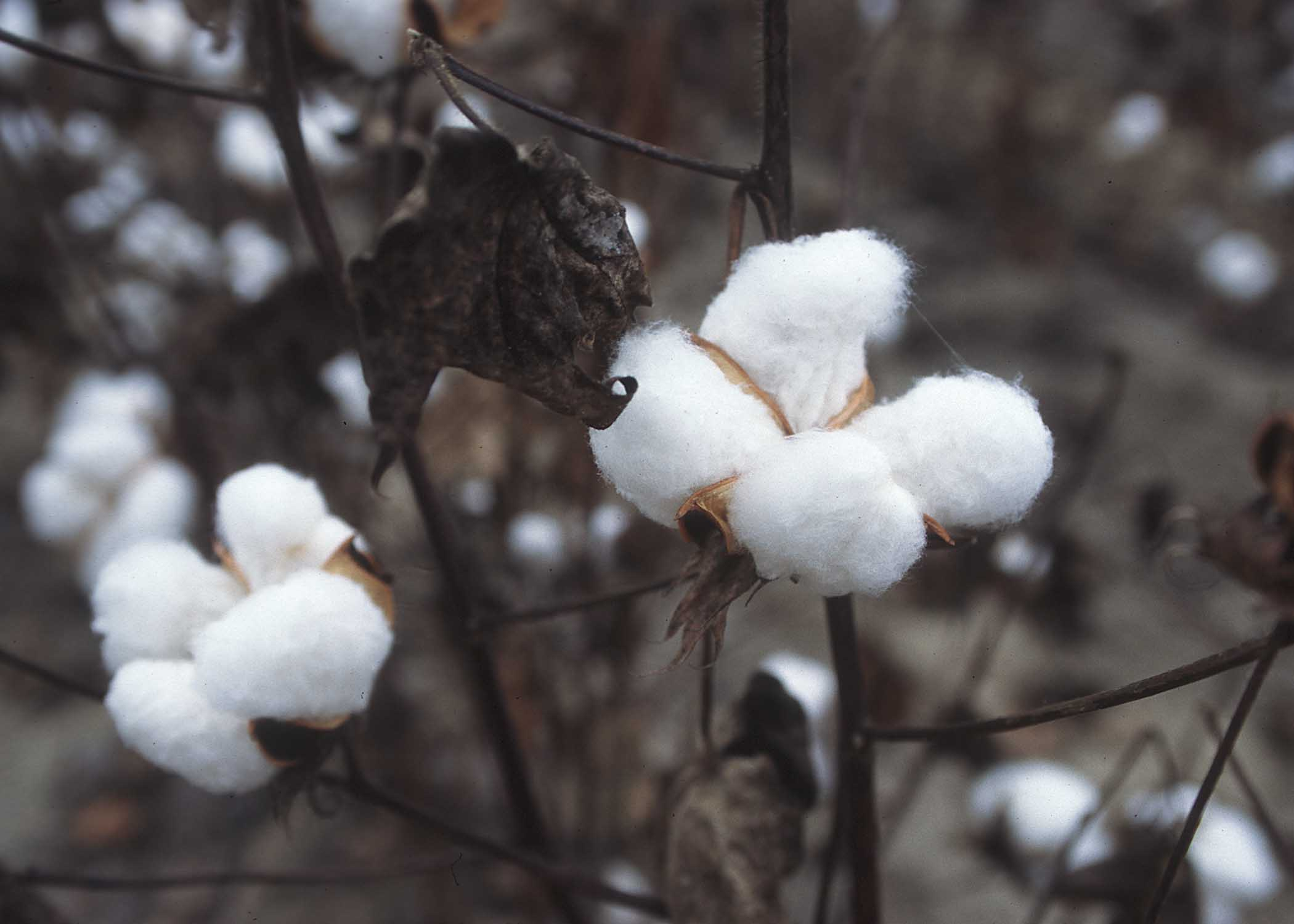
Cotton ready for harvest

But cotton is the staple of Katol trade. In the year 1905-06 26,723 carts of raw uncleaned cotton were sold in the market, and that number is liable to be exceeded in years of heavy harvest, for the town draws produce from the rich valleys of the Jam and Wardha rivers and from many villages of the Amravati and Wardha Districts. There are now four ginning factories at work, and three of these have presses also. They are fitted with 216 gins, which in 1905-06 turned out 32,000 bales (or 512,000 maunds) of cleaned cotton.

The Katol tahsil has a total area of 800 square miles (2,100 km^{2}), of which 56 are comprised in Government forest.

Katol has, on the whole, the poorest soils of the four tahsils as regards composition, although it has all the kali soils of the first class in the District . The percentages of the various soils are 2 for kali, 55.9 for morand, 28.5 for khardi and 13.2; for bardi. Nevertheless, from an agricultural point of view Katol is the most advanced of the four tahsils, and its lands produce kharif crops as valuable as the wheat of the other tahsils. The cultivators are intelligent and enterprising to an unusual degree and spend much time and money on improvements to their fields. Of the 17,000 acres (69 km^{2}) of irrigated garden land at settlement 8,000 acres (32 km^{2}) were in Katol. Of the total area of 476,000 acres (1,930 km^{2}) at settlement, 358,000 were occupied and 332,000 were in cultivation. The actual area cropped has risen since the thirty years' settlement from 265,000 acres (1,070 km^{2}) to 337,000 acres (1,360 km^{2}) in 1906–07, an increase of 29 percent, which is the largest in any tahsil. Of the total area 75 percent is occupied, 8.7 is scrub jungle, 4.2 tree-forest, and 11.8 unculturable.

Once Katol and Kalmeshwar talukas in Nagpur district had enough groundwater to irrigate their orange orchards, but in the past decade or so, the water table has gone down to 700–900 feet in almost the entire belt and digging of bore wells has become uneconomical. Farmers here have now switched to conventional dry-land farming of cotton and soybean, with the area under orange cultivation reduced almost to half.

== Temples ==
Chandika Devi Mandir – The temple is believed to have been built during the reign of one king Chandrahasa, who is supposed to have ruled over this territory in the dim and distant past. The construction of the temple is. in the Hemadpanthi style. It is situated in the old Basti. The 'Gabhara', which contains the idol of the goddess, measures 9.290 m.2 (10' x 10'). It is beautifully carved out of black rock and is in a standing position. On either side of the entrance to the 'Gabhara' are two images in standing posture which appear to be the bodyguards of the goddess Chandika. Outside is the ' Sabhamandap' having windows on all the four sides which serve as inlets for the sunlight. In the center exactly facing the goddess is a 'Honikunda' housed by a little dome. On the 'Mandap' wall, to the left of the goddess, is engraved the image of Lord Gajanan with exquisite skill. Against the outer side of the Mandap-walls are carved the images of animals, wild as well as domestic, and numerous deities which add a tinge of glory and glamor to the solid and grave structure of the building. The architectural designs speak eloquently of the architects of those times. In Navratra, Shardotsava is celebrated with great éclat when thousands of people gather to pay homage to the goddess.

Sharada Mandir— The idol is supposed to be ' Svayambhu'. It is a small building housing two images of the same goddess of unequal size. The images depict a sort of crude and rough architecture. In front of the temple is a tank of water of the size of a square measuring 37.161 m.2 (20' x 20'), whose water, it is said, never dries up. The place is venerated by the Hindus as a ' Tirtha Ksetra'. By the side of the tank is another small temple which houses the images of Maruti, Ganapati and Shivling. To the left of the Sharada Mandir is housed yet another Shivling by the side of which are three small samadhis of unknown persons. Two fairs, one on the occasion of Shardotsava and the other on Chaitra Shuddha 15th, are held when devotees of the goddess gather in large numbers.

Shiv Mandir – The Mandir is situated on the southern bank of a tank, now let on lease to the Government for pisciculture, with a hillock at the hack and a giant Pimpal tree in the front. The inner shrine or 'Gabhara' of the temple is 5.945 m.2 (8' x 8') with Ling occupying the central position. The Ling is donned with a brass plaque. On the wall facing the visitor are engraved the images of innumerable deities. Outside is the 'Mandap' of the temple enclosed on all the four sides with walls having a single entrance in the front. It is used to deliver Kirtans and hold religious discourses in praise of the God. To the south of the temple of Shiv there is a temple of Maruti whose image is about 3 meters (10 ft) tall. The Pimpal tree protects under its shade one more Shivling and an image of Nandi both carved out of black stone.

== Education ==
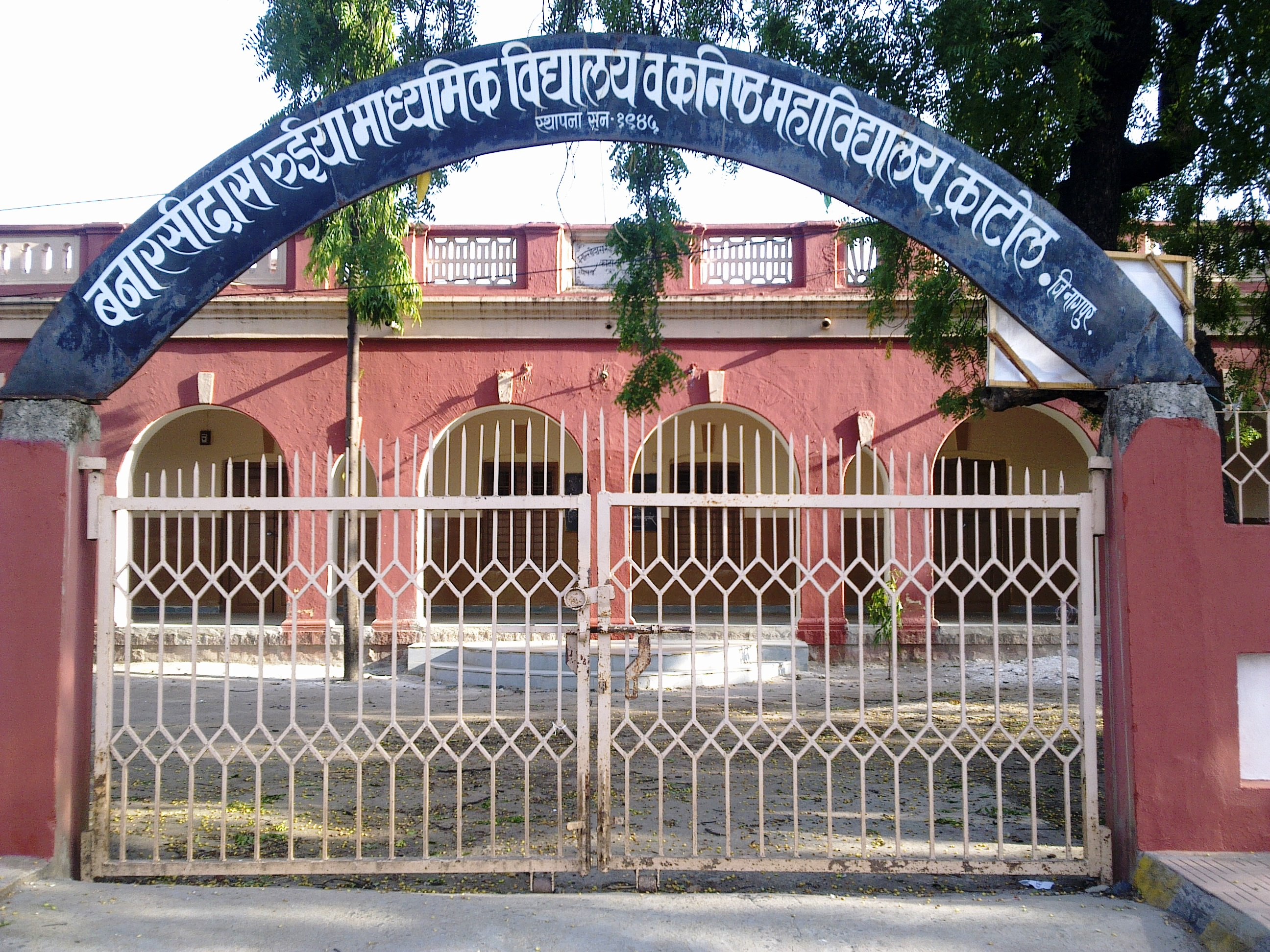
Banarasidas Ruiya High School and Junior College, Katol.

The educational institutions comprise an English middle school "Banarasidas Ruiya High School and Junior College" established in year 1945, with capacity for 250 pupils. This is one among the oldest education institutes in Nagpur city. The building is now extended to provide education to more students in Katol and nearby towns.

Another major educational institute is Nabira Mahavidyalaya of Shikshan Prasarak Mandal (S.P.M.). Nabira Mahavidyalaya was established in 1961. It has Science, commerce & Arts faculties. Besides these, college of Education and Pharmacy college were started. A number of self-financing courses are going on in. The college such as Electronics, Computer Science, B.B.A, post graduation in chemistry, Post graduation in history and M.B.A. Post Graduation in Mathematics has been Introduced from the academic session 2007–08. Diploma in education course too has been stated recently. Though situated at a Taluka place, the college competes with any reputed institution in bigger cities with respect to infrastructure facilities and highly qualified teaching facilities. The college also has a consistent record of good result with students topping in merit lists. Shikshan Prasarak Mandal (S.P.M.) governs following institutions in Katol,

- Nabira Mahavidyalaya(B.A., B.Sc.. B.Com., M.A., M.Sc., M.Com., B.B.A.)
- Shikshan Mahavidyalaya (B.Ed. & D.Ed.)
- Smt. Kusumtai Wankhede Institute of Pharmacy (D.Pharm.)
- Department of Management Studies. (M.B.A)
- Crop science and Horticulture courses at 10+2 level are famous to get admission at B.Sc. Agriculture.
- Nagar Parishad High School & Junior Science College
- Banarasidas Ruiya High School & Junior College

There are two branch schools and a girls, school. For the town's requirements a large new school is shortly to be built on the plateau to the south-east across which the main road is to be diverted. Here too a new post and telegraph office is to be built and a new Tehsil court. A portion of the open ground has been utilized for a Town Hall, which is now completed, the funds for which were raised by subscription, and on another portion a small Club House is being erected. Close to these sites stands the present Tehsil office, which is to be converted into a police Station-house, and the dispensary. Recently a swimming pool, gymnasium and garden was inaugurated in Katol. The premise is called as Chhatrapati Shivaji Maharaj Swimming Pool. It provides amenities for sports and leisure activities. The beautification of the lake is also done and a huge fountain is erected at the lake. Boating facility is also available at this small lake.

Banarasidas High school is the oldest school in the city established in 1945. Mount Carmel Convent School, St. Pauls School, Vidyavihar College, NP Convent School, NP School No.11, NP School No.2, NP School No.3, Nagar Parishad HighSchool and NP School No.5 are all schools run by Nagar Parishad Katol and all of them have e-Learning facilities, a Midday Meal Scheme & all students are given a free pair of school dress and shoes. This scheme was implemented by Former Municipal Council President Rahul Virendra Deshmukh.

== Meteorite shower of May 2012 ==
A large meteorite shower in the Katol region damaged several houses on 2012 May 22 between 14:00 and 14:30 local time. The phenomenon of balls of fire shooting from the sky accompanied by huge blast-like sounds was witnessed by many in the evening around 17:00. The shower was traveling in the eastern direction and is the first such meteorite shower recorded in the Vidarbha region of Maharashtra. The meteor shower was accompanied by earth tremors measuring 2.1 on the Richter Scale. The biggest among the meteorites weighed 673.5 grams. The surface was completely burnt showing dark brown roasted colour with sub-rounded edges. GSI said the sample is a stony meteorite dominated by silicates (olivine and others) with a little iron. These are the oldest rocks in the Solar System.

== Notable people ==
- Anil Deshmukh, Nationalist Congress Party politician from Maharashtra who served as Minister for Home Affairs in Government of Maharashtra from 2019 to 2021.
- Ranjeet Deshmukh, president of Maharashtra Pradesh Congress Committee, who served as the agriculture minister from 1999 to 2004
- Shrikant Jichkar (September 1954 – June 2004), was an Indian politician (I.A.S. and I.P.S.) He held numerous academic degrees, known as the most qualified person in India.
- S. K. Wankhede (September 1914 -January 1988), barrister from Kohali, Maharashtra Assembly minister and a cricket administrator. Wankhede Stadium in Mumbai is named after him.
