= Narkhed taluka =

Coordinates: 21.4351735°N 79.1235352°E

Narkhed Taluka
- Tehsil
- Narkher
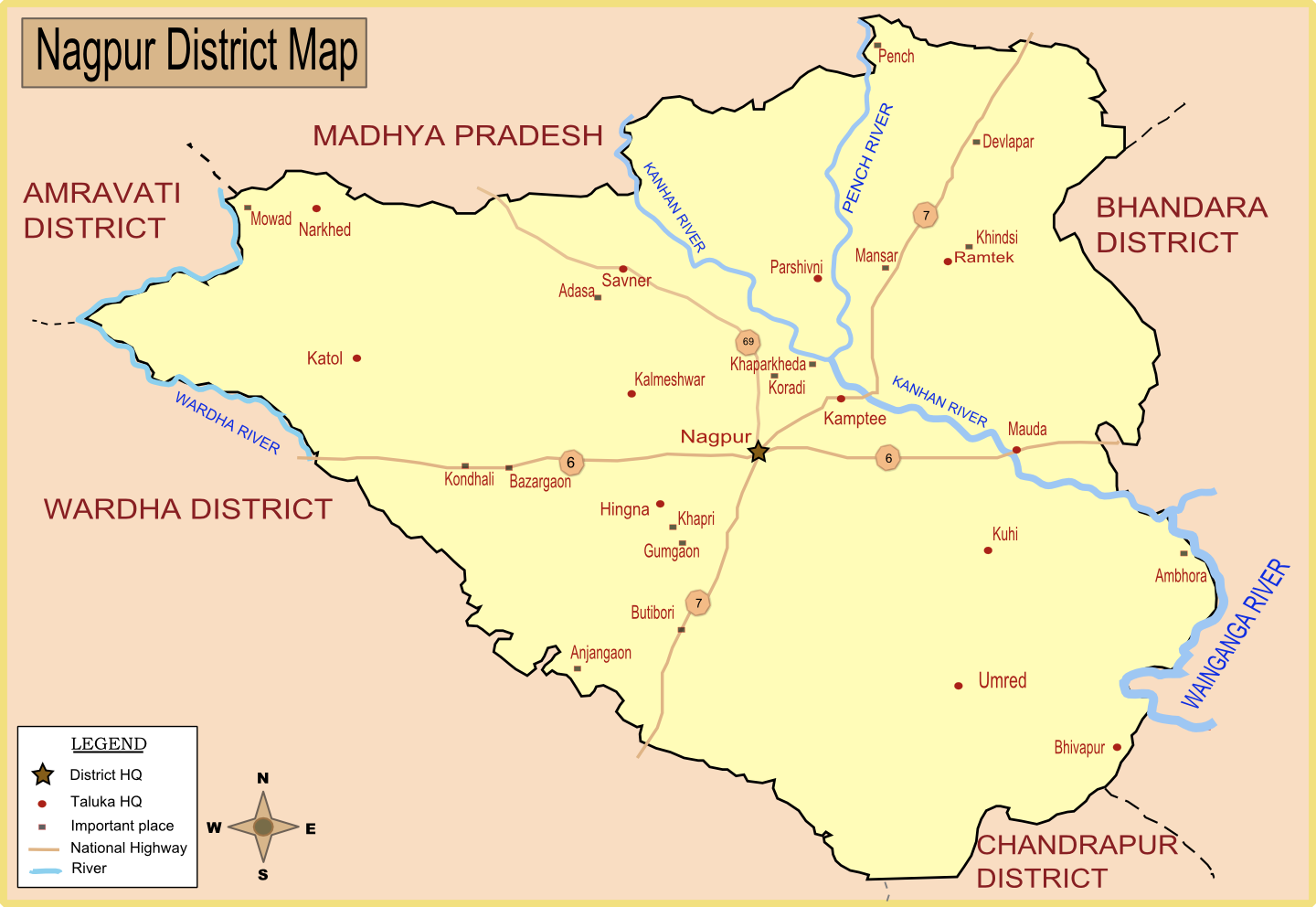
- Map of Nagpur district with major towns(including Narkhed) and rivers.
- Country: India
- State: Maharashtra
- Regions: Vidharbha
- District: Nagpur District
- Headquarters: Narkhed

Area
  - Total: 644.91 km^{2} (249.00 sq mi)

Population (2001 census)
  - Total: 143,512
  - Density: 222.53/km^{2} (576.35/sq mi)
  - Sex ratio: 935
- Time zone: UTC+5:30 (IST)
- PIN: Jalalkheda- 441301; Khairgoan - 441303; Narkhed - 441304; Bishnoor - 441305; Sawargoan - 441306; Lohari Sawanga - 441305
- STD Code: 91-7105
- Villages: 154
- Revenue circle: 7
- Average rainfall: 1175 mm

Narkhed taluka is one of the 14 taluka of Nagpur district in state of Maharashtra, India.

== Geography ==
Narkhed taluka has total area of 64491 Hectors. Most of the area of Narkhed taluka are under agricultural land. Some area are hilly and cover with rare forest also.

Wardha river is flowing from western border of taluka. Kar river is flowing from southern border of taluka and Kolar river is flowing from eastern border of taluka. Other river are Jam, Mandakini, Wandali etc.

Mowad and Narkhed has municipal council. Lohari Sawanga, Sawargoan, Jalalkheda, Khairgoan, Belona, Thugoan Deo, Yenikoni, Kharsoli, Bindnoor, Bharsinghi, Tadhipauni, Ambada(t) are major villages in the taluka.

Narkhed is surrounded by Pandhurna taluka towards North, Warud taluka towards west, Saoner taluka towards East, Kalmeshwar taluka South East, Katol taluka towards South, Karanja taluka South west.

Narkhed, Pandhurna, Shendurjana, Warud, Katol, Saoner are the nearby Cities to Narkhed.

This place is in the border of the Nagpur District and Chhindwara District. Chhindwara District Pandhurna is North towards this place . It is near to the Madhya Pradesh State Border.

== Demographics ==
Sr.No.	Narkhed Taluka			
1.	Toatal Population(2001)			
2.	Rural Population	113238	Male : 58627	Female : 54611
3.	City Population	30274	Male : 15549	Female : 14725
4.	Total Families	30422		
5.	Total Rural Family	26879		
6.	Total Cities Family	6023		
7.	Total Literacy Percentage	77.4	Male : 84.33	Female : 69.98
8.	Percentage of Rural Literacy	76.06	Male : 83.16	Female : 68.43
9.	Total Literacy Percentage	82.38	पुरुष : 88.77	Female : 75.68

Year	Male	Female	Total Population	Change	Religion (%)							
Year	Male	Female	Total Population	Change	Hindu	Muslim	Christian	Sikhs	Buddhist	Jain	Other religions and persuasions	Religion not stated
2001	74176	69336	143512	-	84.374	3.562	0.056	0.128	11.536	0.152	0.114	0.079
2011	75993	71914	147907	3.062	84.547	3.632	0.068	0.161	11.150	0.111	0.247	0.085

== Culture and Religions ==
Most of the people in taluka are Hindu. Other than Hindu, Buddhist, Muslim are also living in taluka. In Hindu most of the people are Teli and Kunbi. Tribal people like Gond are also in large number. All the festival like Holi, Diwali, Dasara, Pola, Ganesh Utsav are celebrated in the taluka. There are melas on Holi, Navratri, Shivratri, Pola and many more. Many Varkari used to go Pandharpur on Ashadhi Ekadashi. As well as people of the area also used to visit Chauragarh Mahadev on Nag Panchami and Shivratri. Other than that Id, Buddha Purnima, Ambedkar Jayanti, Christmas and New Year are also celebrated in the town.

Jalalkheda is famous for it Shivratri mela. Narkhed town is famous for Navratri mela. Belona is famous for Hanuman Temple and mela in month of December.

== Climate ==
Narkhed taluka has a tropical wet and dry climate with hot, dry summers and mild to cool winters. Summer start from March to June, monsoon season from July to October and winter from November to March.

Average maximum temperature in summer is in-between 37 and 46 °C. Average minimum temperature is in-between 9 and 19 °C. Average rainfall is in between 110 and 120 cm.

== Administration ==
Narkhed is the taluka headquarter and Panchayat Samiti. There are 154 villages( 138 villages are inhabited and 16 are villages uninhabited ) under Narkhed taluka and 70 Gram Panchayat. Narkhed is under Katol Vidhan Sabha seat and Ramtek Lok Sabha constituency.

Narkhed and Mowad has a Municipal Council

== List of Panchayat Village ==
- Aarambhi
- Agra
- Amabada(sai)
- Ambala(de)
- Banor(p)
- Banorchandra
- Belona
- Bharsingi
- Bhishnur
- Datewadi
- Dawsa
- Dewdi
- Dindargaon
- Ghogra
- Godhani(g)
- Hiwarmath
- Jalalkheda
- Jamgaon(b)
- Jamgaon(ku)
- Junona
- Khairgaon
- Khandala(bu)
- Khapa(gu)
- Khaprikene
- Kharada
- Kharasi
- Kharbadi
- Kharsoli
- Khedi(gogo)
- Khedikaryat
- Kinkheda
- Lohari Sawanga
- Madna
- Mahendri
- Malapur
- Manikwada
- Masora
- Maywadi
- Mendhala
- Mogra
- Mohagaon(b)
- Mohandidhotra
- Mohdidalvi
- Narsingi
- Parsodi(di)
- Pethismailpur
- Pimpalgaon(w)
- Pimpalgaon®
- Pipla(ke)
- Ramthi
- Rohna
- Saiwada(a)
- Sakharkheda
- Sawargaon
- Shemda
- Sindi
- Singarkheda
- Sinjar
- Thadipawni
- Thaturwada
- Thugaondev
- Thugaonnipani
- Umri
- Umtha
- Vivra
- Wadegoan(u)
- Wadhona
- Wadwihira
- Yenikoni
- Yerla

=== Other Villages ===
- Ambada
- Ambada D
- Ambola
- Babulkheda
- Baradpavni
- Bhaiwadi
- Bopapur
- Borkhedi Theke
- Chorkhairi
- Dewali
- Dhotra
- Gaimukh
- Gangaldoh
- Gondegaon
- Gumgaon
- Hiwara
- Indarwada
- Indora
- Jatlapur
- Jolwadi
- Junewani
- Junona Fuke
- Junoni G
- Karanjoli
- Karimabad
- Khadki
- Khalangondri
- Khapri
- Khargad
- Khedi Kh
- Khushalpur
- Khutkheda
- Koni
- Lohagad
- Mal
- Lohara
- Lohgad T
- Mahajanpur
- Maiwadi
- Mamdapur
- Mannath
- Math
- Mohagaon
- Naigaon D
- Naigaon T
- Nanda S
- Nandni
- Nandori
- Narayanpur
- Nasirpur
- Nawegaon
- Panwadi
- Pardi
- Parsodi
- Pilapur
- Pimpaldhara
- Pipala Kh
- Pithori
- Ramgaon
- Rampuri M
- Ranwadi
- Sahajapur
- Saiwada
- Sardi
- Shemba
- Shindi
- Umari
- Tara
- Telgaon
- Thugaon N
- Tinkheda
- Toyapur
- Udapur R
- Utara
- Warjali
- Yeni

== Agriculture ==
Area of Agriculture Land is about 48000 hectors. It is about 74.43% of total area. Narkhed is very much famous all over the country for it Orange. Once Narkhed was Asia largest Santra Mandi. Other than orange cotton, soyabean are also another major cash crop in Narkhed taluka. Other crop are wheat, jowar, rice. In pulses like Tul, Moong and Harbara are also cultivating in the taluka. Because of big demand of vegetables in Nagpur market farmer also growing vegetables throughout the year. Both the session of rabi and kharif has taken in Narkhed.

== Irrigation ==
Agriculture in taluka is mostly depends on rainfall. Other than that farmer used water well, tube well, river, irrigation dam, canal for irrigation. Pimpalgoan Wakhaji is the biggest irrigation dam in Narkhed taluka. Kar dam is covering big area under irrigation through canal. The other irrigation dam are Paradsinga dam, Ambada dam and many more. But still it is on very small level and there are big scope for development in irrigation facilities. River like Wardha, Jam, Mandakini, Wandali, Kolar, and other river are used for irrigation for Rabi crop. But farmers face serious water problems in summer and it has become very difficult to maintain Orange orchards without water.

== Transportation ==
Narkhed taluka is well connected with all the village with taluka headquarter, with all session tar road. It Connected with State Highway SH245, SH246, SH247, SH248.

Narkhed-Mohadi(D)-Yenwa, Narkhed-Teenkheda-Bhisnoor-Bharsinghi, Jalalkheda-Thadipauni-Ambada, Sawargoan-Mohagoan(b)-Pipla are major district road. Other than this almost all village are connected by Pradhan Mantri Gram Sadak Yojana.

Narkhed, Jalalkheda, Mowad, Bharshingi, Sawargaon and Lohari Sawanga are major bus stop of MSRTC.

Narkhed taluka is also having good rail connectivity. Narkher Junction railway station is main railway station of the taluka. Other station are Mowad and Tinkheda. Chennai-New Delhi Grand trunk route and Narkhed-Amravati are two railway line passing through taluka.

Narkhed taluka is well connected with Katol, Nagpur, Pandhurna, Warud, Multai, Saoner ard other major town and city of near by area by road and railway.

== See also ==
- Narkhed City
- Badnera-Narkhed Section
