= State Highway 246 (Maharashtra) =

Road in Maharashtra, India

State Highway 246

Route information
- Maintained by MSRDC
- Length: 26 km (16 mi)

Major junctions
- East end: Sawargoan, Nagpur
- West end: Mowad, Nagpur

Location
- Country: India
- State: Maharashtra
- Districts: Nagpur.
- Primary destinations: Sawargoan, Narkhed, Mowad.

Highway system
- Roads in India; Expressways; National; State; Asian; State Highways in Maharashtra

Maharashtra State Highway 246, commonly referred to as MH SH 246, is a normal state highway in Nagpur, in the Indian state of Maharashtra. This state highway touches Sawargoan, Narkhed and Mowad.

== Summary ==
This road is one of the important road for Narkhed taluka, touching three important place and providing connectivity with Katol, Nagpur, Warud and the rest of India.

== Major junctions ==
This highway started from the intersection at Sawargoan village with MH SH 247 and end at Mowad town connecting with MH SH 245 in Narkhed taluka, Nagpur District.

== Connections ==
Many villages, cities and towns in Nagpur District are connected by this state highway.

- Sawargoan
- Yeni-Koni
- Pimpalgoan (w)
- Kamthi (t)
- Narkhed Town
- Belona
- Mowad Town

== See also ==
- List of state highways in Maharashtra
