= Sawanga =

Village in Maharashtra

Sawanga Lohari Sawanga
- village
- Lohari Sawanga
- Location in Maharashtra, India Sawanga (India)
- Coordinates: 21.258°N 78.400°E
- Country: India
- State: Maharashtra
- District: Nagpur
- Taluka: Narkhed

Government
  - Body: Gram Panchayat Loahri Sawanga

Population (2011)
  - Total: 5,265

Languages
  - Official: Marathi
- Time zone: UTC+5:30 (IST)

Sawanga is a village located 87 kilometre west of Nagpur in the Nagpur district and in the Narkhed Taluka of Vidarbha region in Maharashtra, India. It is 810 kilometres (500 mi) from Mumbai. Lohari Sawanga is bordered by Karanja Ghadge Taluka to the South, Warud Taluka to the west, Katol Taluka to the east, and Pandhurna Taluka of Madhya Pradesh to the north. The primary language of the village is Marathi. The closest railway station are Mowad Railway Station, Katol railway station and Narkher Junction railway station. State Highway 245 of Maharashtra passes from Lohari Sawanga.

Lohari Sawanga comes under Katol Vidhan Sabha Constituency and Ramtek Lok Sabha Constituency.
