= Outer Ring Road, Nagpur =

Road in Maharashtra, India

Route information
- Maintained by National Highways Authority of India
- Length: 119 km (74 mi)
- Existed: 2010–present

Location
- Country: India
- States: Maharashtra

Highway system
- Roads in India; Expressways; National; State; Asian

The Outer Ring Road is a 119 km under construction ring road around the city of Nagpur, in Maharashtra. A part of the road is between NH 44 (towards south of the city) and NH 56 towards east of the city of 62 km length is already operational. The National Highways Authority of India (NHAI) has issued work orders for execution of remaining stretch of 61 km. The value of work orders is Rs 1,170 crore making it the biggest ongoing road project in and around the city. After Pardi flyover, it would be second to be executed since city MP Nitin Gadkari became union minister for road transport and highways under which NHAI is functioning.

It gives an easy connectivity between NH 44, NH 53, NH 47, MSH 3, MSH 9, MSH 248, MSH 255, MH 264 and it will be linked to the under construction Mumbai–Nagpur Expressway.

== Project Details ==
For speedy completion, the NHAI divided the stretch of 61 km into two parts. Mumbai-based MEP Infrastructure Pvt Ltd bagged both the contracts worth Rs 531 crore and Rs 639 crore in 2018 on build-operate-transfer basis. NHAI issued letter of acceptance to MEP Infrastructure on 31 March 2018. The entire 61-km stretch of ORR will be in concrete.

The project will be developed under NHAI's hybrid annuity system. NHAI will pay 40% of total cost to the contractor during the construction period. Remaining 60% will be paid in three instalments over 15 years from the date of completion with a fixed rate of return. The project is first project in the state, and second in the country, to be developed under hybrid annuity system.

The 33.50km ORR from Jamtha to Fetri allows vehicles to run at 100kmph. It has 16 service roads, three 2.5km-long flyovers. Bamboo crash barriers too have been installed, making it the second NHAI road having such feature. The work on 28km package-II of the ORR from Fetri on Kalmeshwar-Katol Road towards Kamptee-Jabalpur NH44 highway will be completed in the next two months. Almost 90% of the work has been completed, except work on ROBs at four spots.

NHAI will levy toll to recover the project cost. Toll will be recovered by NHAI through a private agency other than one executing the project.

== Route ==
Under this project, NHAI will construct a new 40-km cement concrete, four-lane road from Gondkhairi on Amravati road to Bhilgaon-Sirpur on Kamptee-Jabalpur section of NH 44 road via Fetri on Kalmeshwar-Katol road, Bharatwada, Panjara on Koradi-Chhindwara section of NH 47. It will also widen 21 km stretch Gondkhairi to Gavasi Manapur on NH 44 from existing two-lane to four-lane and convert it to concrete road. The ORR will also have an interchange with the under construction Mumbai–Nagpur Expressway.

NHAI will construct five railway overbridges, 20 minor bridges and 15 underpasses under the project.

== See also ==
- Mumbai–Nagpur Expressway
