= Kalambha railway station =

Railway station in Maharashtra

Kalambha

General information
- Location: State Highway 248, Yerla, Katol taluka, Nagpur district, Maharashtra; India
- Coordinates: 21.344635°N 78.558413°E
- Elevation: 405 metres (1,329 ft)
- System: Indian Railway Station
- Owner: Indian Railways
- Operator: West Central Railway
- Line: Bhopal–Nagpur section
- Platforms: 2
- Tracks: 2

Construction
- Structure type: Standard (on ground station)
- Parking: No
- Cycle facilities: No

Other information
- Status: Functioning
- Station code: KLBA
- Zone(s): West Central Railway
- Division(s): Nagpur CR

History
- Opened: 1884; 142 years ago

Services
Preceding station	Indian Railways	Following station
Tinkheda towards Bhopal Junction	West Central Railway zone Bhopal–Nagpur section	Katol towards Nagpur Junction
Location
- Location within India Location within Maharashtra

Kalambha railway station is a railway station of Bhopal–Nagpur section under Nagpur CR railway division of West Central Railway zone of Indian Railways. The station is situated beside State Highway 248 at Yerla, Katol taluka in Nagpur district in the Indian state of Maharashtra.

== History ==
The Bhopal–Itarsi line was opened by the Begum of Bhopal in 1884. Itarsi and Nagpur Junction railway station was linked in between 1923 and 1924. Electrification started in Bhopal–Itarsi section in 1988–89 and the rest Itarsi to Nagpur section was electrified in 1990–91.
