= State Highway 245 (Maharashtra) =

Road in Maharashtra, India

State Highway 245

Route information
- Maintained by MSRDC

Major junctions
- South end: Karanja
- North end: Bangoan, near Mowad Madhya Pradesh Border

Location
- Country: India
- State: Maharashtra
- Districts: Wardha District, Nagpur District.
- Primary destinations: Karanja, Lohari Sawanga, Bharsinghi, Jalalkheda, Mowad.

Highway system
- Roads in India; Expressways; National; State; Asian; State Highways in Maharashtra

Maharashtra State Highway 245 (SH 245), is a state highway in Wardha District and Nagpur District, in the state of Maharashtra. This state highway touches Karanja, Lohari Sawanga, Bharsinghi, Jalalkheda, Mowad, up to Madhya Pradesh border connecting with MSH 10 at Bangoan near Pandhurna in Madhya Pradesh. Hence it provides connectivity with NH 53 to NH 47.

== Summary ==
This road is one of the important roads in Nagpur District and Wardha District providing connectivity with NH-6 and NH 69

== Major junctions ==
This highway started from the intersection at Karanja town with National Highway 53 (India)( NH6 old numbering) and end at Bangoan village in Madhya Pradesh connecting with MSH 10 near Maharashtra border, in Chhindwara District.

== Connections ==
Many villages, cities and towns in Nagpur District and Wardha District are connecting by this state highway.

- Karanja
- Lohari Sawanga
- Bharsinghi
- Jalalkheda
- Mowad

== See also ==
- List of state highways in Maharashtra
