= State Highway 247 (Maharashtra) =

Road in Maharashtra, India

State Highway 247

Route information
- Maintained by MSRDC
- Length: 50 km (31 mi)

Major junctions
- South end: Kondhali, Nagpur
- North end: Badchicoli, up to Madhya Pradesh Border

Location
- Country: India
- State: Maharashtra
- Districts: Nagpur.
- Primary destinations: Sawargoan, Narkhed, Mowad.

Highway system
- Roads in India; Expressways; National; State; Asian; State Highways in Maharashtra

Maharashtra State Highway 247 is a state highway in Nagpur, in the state of Maharashtra. This state highway touches Kondhali, Katol, Sawargoan, up to Madhya Pradesh border connecting with NH 69 at Badchicholi.

== Summary ==
This road is one of the important road in Nagpur District providing connectivity with two National Highway National Highway 6 (India, old numbering) and NH 69

== Major junctions ==
This highway started from the intersection at Kondhali village with National Highway 6 (India, old numbering) and end at Badchicholi town connecting with NH 69 near Maharashtra border, in Nagpur District.

== Connections ==
Many villages, cities and towns in Nagpur districts are connecting by this state highway.

- Kondhali
- Katol
- Sawargoan, Maharashtra
- Badchicholi

== See also ==
- List of state highways in Maharashtra
