= Hiwarkhed =

Hiwarkhed Hiwarkhed(Orange City)
- Village Town
- Hiwarkhed (Orange City)
- Nicknames: Orange City, California of Vidarbha
- Location in Maharashtra, India
- Coordinates: 21.3921°N 78.0435°E
- Country: India
- State: Maharashtra
- District: Akola
- Named for: World Class export quality Oranges

Government
  - Type: Nagar Parishad
  - Member of Legislative Assembly: Devendra Bhuyar
- Elevation: 392 m (1,286 ft)

Population (2011)
  - Total: 23,216

Languages
  - Official: Marathi
- Time zone: UTC+5:30 (IST)
- PIN: 07258
- Pin code: 444103,
- Vehicle registration: MH 30

Hiwarkhed is one of the largest towns in Telhara Taluka belonging to Telhara taluka, in the Indian state of Maharashtra. Hiwarkhed (Orange City) has a population of 23,000. Hiwarkhed has huge history, you will find many rich people across the village but their nature grounded. People of Hiwarkhed also known as Hiwarkhedkar and people are very generous and hard worker. It has prominent temples and this village has diversity across religion. Many people established orange business in this village and this village use to export oranges across the world. This village exports highest oranges and due to this village Nagpur’s orange Market runs.

Hiwarkhed is one of the largest villages, hosting 5 schools, including 2 convents (English medium).

== Culture ==
Hiwarkhed has many temples. The RadhaKrishna temple is the largest.

The village has a public library.

== Economy ==
The village hosts many orange orchards whose produce is widely exported.

== Health care ==
A government hospital provides health care. The hospital won the Anandebai Joshi award. This Primary Health Centre was converted into A Health and Wellness Centre (आरोग्यवर्धिनी केंद्र).

== Transport ==
=== Rail ===
Planning for the 140-km Narkhed and Amravati railroad began in 1928 under the British. The project was revived only in 1993–94 with a budget of Rs 2.84 billion. Then-Prime Minister P.V. Narasimha Rao laid the foundation stone. Protests by the Shiv Sena, which opposed the required displacement of people, stalled the project.

In September 2008, President Pratibha Patil inaugurated the New Amravati station. In November 2009, the Railway Ministry announced the link would be inaugurated in December 2010.

The electrified Narkhed-Amravati line finally opened in January 2014. Hiwarkhed's railway station was named Hiwarkhed railway station. It has a single platform.
