= Chudaman River =

Chudamani चुडामनी

Location
- Country: India

Physical characteristics
- Source
  - location: Tiwarkhed, Multai, Madhya Pradesh Ghats of Satpuda hill range
  - elevation: 392 m (1,286 ft)
- Mouth
  - location: Wardha
- Length: 124 km (77 mi)

Basin features
- Progression: Madhya Pradesh, Maharashtra

Chudamani River is a holy river. It originates from Satpuda Hill Range in the state Madhya Pradesh.It is a right bank tributary of Wardha river which meets the latter near 'Zunj Waterfall'. It is said that it had milk flow of water. On the banks of this river, Warud city is located. The Warud tehsil received record rainfall on 7 and 8 August 2022 owing to which the Chudamani river had breached the peak level and undergone high flooding.

== Dam ==
There is a dam named "Nagthana", well known by people of Warud built on the river Chudamani. It is an overflow type of dam. There are two storage spaces in the dam; 1) Nagthana phase 1, and 2) Nagthana phase 2. Nagthana is the place near Rawala village in Warud, Taluka. At Nagthana, there is temple of 'nag'. Besides this temple is where the dam located. The dam provides a source of irrigation to farms near Rawala. There are fishing activities participated in by some people. From the walls of this dam, the cities Shendurjana Ghat and Warud are visible.
