= Narkhed–Badnera line =

Indian railway route

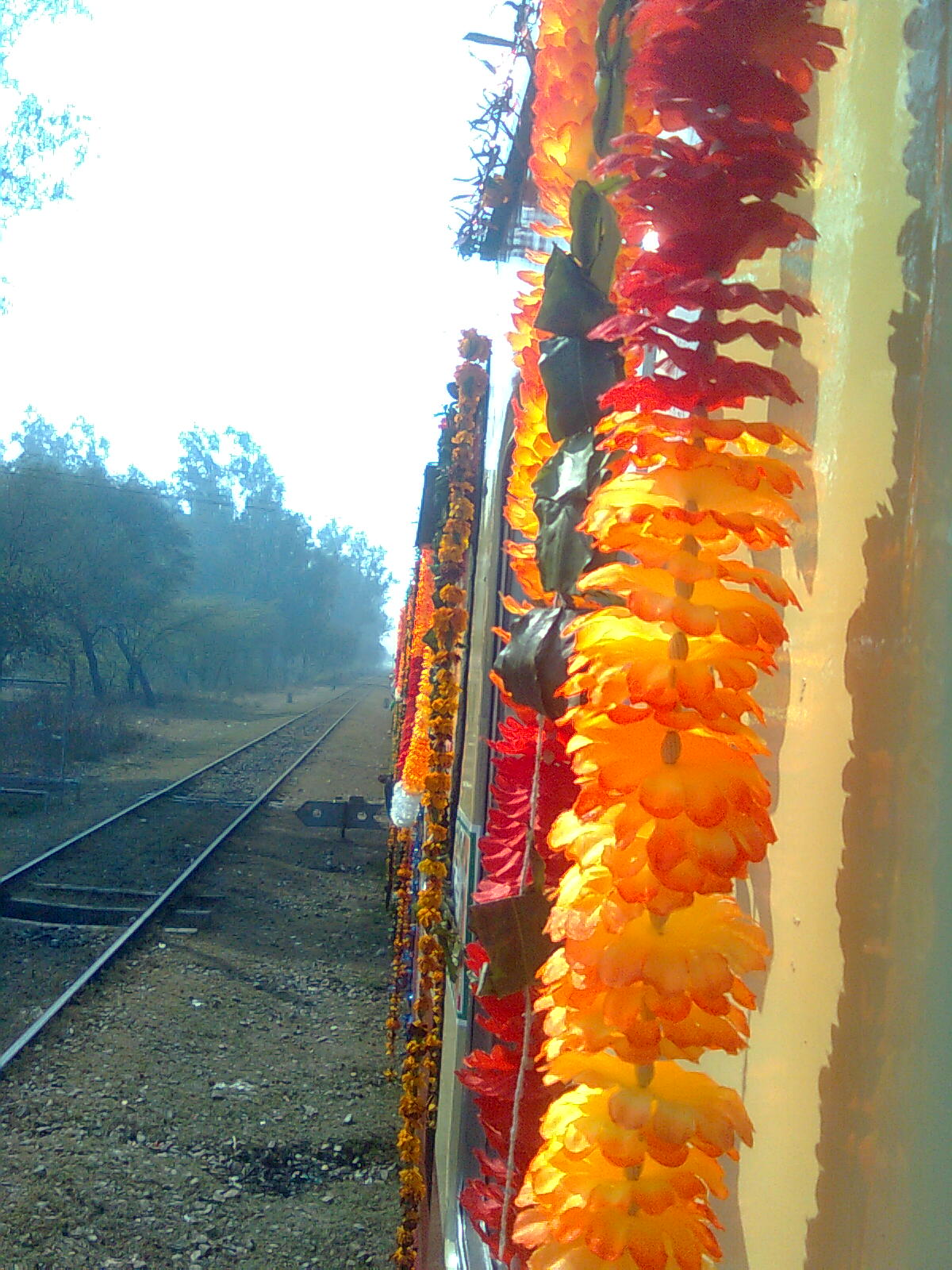

Overview
- Status: Functional
- Owner: Indian Railways
- Locale: Maharashtra
- Termini: Narkhed; Badnera
- Stations: Morshi, Hiwarkhed, Warud Orange city, Chandurbazar

Service
- Type: Branch line
- System: Single electric line
- Operator(s): Central Railway

History
- Opened: 2012

Technical
- Track length: 138 km (86 mi)
- Number of tracks: Single electric line
- Track gauge: 5 ft 6 in (1,676 mm) broad gauge
- Electrification: Yes
- Operating speed: up to 100km/h
- Highest elevation: Narkhed 398 m (1,306 ft), Amravati 334 m (1,096 ft)

The Narkhed–Badnera line, officially known as the Narkhed–Amravati line, is a single electric branch line which connects Narkhed in Nagpur district to Badnera near Amravati by Indian Railways in the state of Maharashtra. The line is under the administrative jurisdiction of the Central Railway.

== History ==
Narkhed and Amravati towns in Maharashtra's orange belt have waited for more than 80 years to be linked by rail. The 140-km track was first sanctioned in 1928 under the British but stayed on the backburner. The project was revived only in 1993/94 and a budget of Rs 2.84 billion approved.

The then-Prime Minister P. V. Narasimha Rao laid the foundation stone. But protests by the Shiv Sena, which opposed the displacement of people, stalled the project for many more years.

In September 2008, when President Pratibha Patil inaugurated the New Amravati, it seemed as if the project would be completed soon. Far from it. In November 2009, the Railway Ministry announced the link would be inaugurated in December 2010.

But in January 2011, after doing protest by Krupal who is one of the youth leaders among the region then finally it has been completed the project and opened for the people.

== Railway station ==
This railway route has thirteen railway station excluding Narkhed, New Amravati and Badnera. Those are Narkhed, Mowad, Pusla, Warud Orange City, Benoda, Pala, Hiwarkhed, Morshi, Astegoan, Kolvihir, Chandur Bazar, Sirla, Walgaon, New Amravati and Badnera.

== Other aspects ==
The area from which this railway route is passing is agricultural rich belt, famous for orange and cotton growing. The route directly connects many places of tourist interest, including:

- Hanuman Temple of Belon.
- Nal-Damyanti Sagar Dam Morshi
- Muktagiri Jain Temple
- Chikhaldara Hill Station
- Melghat Tiger Reserve
- Amba Devi Temple Amravati
- Gurukunj Mozari

== Optional route ==
This route has become very important because it provided the connectivity between two important railway route in India.

The Delhi–Chennai Grand trunk route and Howrah–akola–Mumbai line both have heavy passenger, as well as goods, train traffic. In the case of the Narkhed–Amravati line, there is the option of diverting the train on this route to continue the rail traffic.

Already two times this kind of situation faced by railway when the train had diverted on the route which showed the importance of the route.

Due to continuous and heavy rains on 19 July 2013, the ballast under the railway track and bank including minor bridge had been washed out completely between Sindi and Tuljapur station on Nagpur–Wardha section.

12 bogies of the goods train derailed between Sonkhamb and Kohli railway stations on Narkhed–Nagpur section on 30 January 2014

Hence we can say that this route provides an optional route to both the heavy traffic route.

== Electrification ==
Narkher Jn–Warud Orange City–Amravati–Badnera Jn line was electrified in 2016–17.

== Trains ==
Currently, some trains are passing through this route:

1. Indore–Yesvantpur Express
2. Gondwana Express
3. Jaipur–Secunderabad Express
4. Amravati–Jabalpur Superfast Express

== See also ==
- Amravati
- Amravati
- Morshi
- Hiwarkhed
- Warud Orange City
- Chandur Bazar
