= Jalalkheda =

Jalalkhera
- Village
- Location in Maharashtra, India
- Coordinates: 21.43924°N 78.7719°E
- Country: India
- State: Maharashtra
- District: Nagpur
- Tehsil: Narkhed

Government
  - Type: Grampanchayat
  - Body: Jalalkheda Grampanchayat
- Elevation: 378.3 m (1,241 ft)

Population (2011)
  - Total: 8,732

Languages
  - Official: Marathi
- Time zone: UTC+5:30 (IST)
- Postal code: 441301
- Telephone code: 07105
- Vehicle registration: MH40

Jalalkhera is a village in Nagpur district of Maharashtra, India. It connected with National Highway NH-353J. Also it is on the confluence of the Wardha and Jam rivers. It is situated 78 km from Nagpur, and the nearest railway stations are Mowad, Warud, Katol, Narkhed. The town is a tourist attraction as it has the Someshwar Fort Temple as well as the confluence of the two rivers. It is under Ramtek Loksabha Constituency and Katol Vidhan Sabha Constituency.

== Demographics ==
Jalalkheda had a population of 8732. Males constitute 51% of the population and females 49%. Jalalkheda has an average literacy rate of 74%, higher than the national average of 59.5%: male literacy is 79%, and female literacy is 68%. In Jalalkheda, 12% of the population is under 6 years of age.

This city is also famous because of a natural calamity on 30 July 1991, the flood of Wardha River.

In Wardha River, flash and big floods had occurred in 1959, 1962, 1979 and 1991. The Wardha River floods of 1962 and 1991 were very severe, causing heavy loss of life, property, crops and infrastructure. After the devastating flood of July 1991, all the houses in Jalalkheda were shifted to safer sites. In terms of damages, Wardha River caused the most severe damage to houses, land and infrastructure. However, low-lying agricultural lands, crops and infrastructure like roads, electric poles, culverts, farm cattle and crops or plantations on the Jalalkheda side of the river received less damages.
