= Adasa, India =

Adasa आदासा
- Village
- Location within Maharashtra Location within India
- Coordinates: 21°19′57.72″N 78°56′24.72″E
- Country: India
- State: Maharashtra
- District: Nagpur

Adasa (Marathi: आदासा) is a village in the Kalmeshwar taluka of Nagpur district in Maharashtra. It is located at a distance of 43 km from Nagpur. Adasa is famous for its magnificent temples. The most popular among these is the Adasa Ganesh Temple, one of the eight ashtavinayaks in Maharashtra's Vidarbha region, dedicated to Lord Ganesha. The village of Adasa is also home to the Lord Mahadev Temple.

== Adasa Temple ==
The shrine is perched atop a tiny hillock and can be reached via trekking or climbing around 50 stairs. The Adasa Ganesh Temple houses an idol of Lord Ganesha, which stands at a height of 11 ft and has been carved out of a single stone. There are around 20 small temples spread around an area of 10 hectare within the premises of the temple. The Adasa Ganesh Temple remains open on all days of the week from 6 am to 9 pm.
