= State Highway 250 (Maharashtra) =

Road in Maharashtra, India

State Highway 250

Route information
- Maintained by MSRDC
- Length: 56 km (35 mi)

Major junctions
- From: Bazargaon
- To: Kelwad,

Location
- Country: India
- State: Maharashtra
- Districts: Nagpur
- Primary destinations: Bazargaon, Kohali, Mohpa, Saoner, Kelwad

Highway system
- Roads in India; Expressways; National; State; Asian; State Highways in Maharashtra

Maharashtra State Highway 200 (MH SH 200) is a normal state highway that starts from Bazargaon at the junction of NH-6 and ends at Maharashtra–Madhya Pradesh border near Kelwad Village. The portion of this highway from Saoner to the Maharashtra-Madhya Pradesh border near Kelwad is common with NH-26B
