= Mohpa =

- city
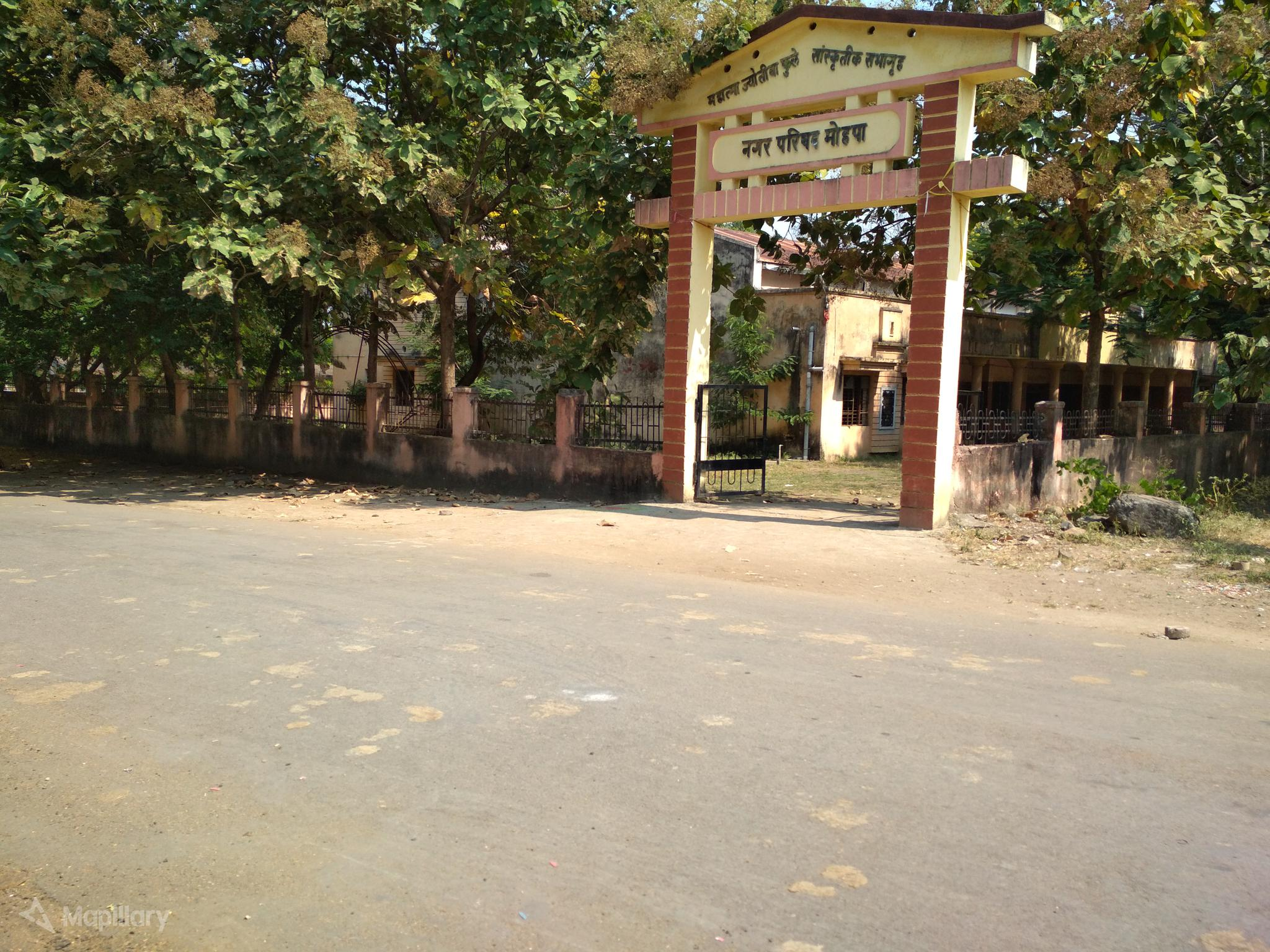
- Cultural Hall of Nagar Parishad, Mohpa

- Location in Maharashtra, India
- Coordinates: 21°18′34″N 78°49′49″E
- Country: India
- State: Maharashtra
- District: Nagpur
- Tahasil: Kalameshwar Former in saoner taluka

Government
  - Type: municipal council

Area
  - Total: 5.18 km^{2} (2.00 sq mi)
- Elevation: 351 m (1,152 ft)

Population (2001)
  - Total: 7,066
  - Density: 1,360/km^{2} (3,530/sq mi)

Languages
  - Official: Marathi
- Time zone: UTC+5:30 (IST)
- Postal code: 441502

Mohpa is a city with a municipal council in Nagpur district in the Indian state of Maharashtra. Although physically located within Kalmeshwar ( former in saoner) taluka, it is not subject to taluka governance. It is divided in to basically three part

1.Galbardi - this area is at the beginning and higher in height from Mohpa, so in regional language hill means 'Gal' and area means 'Bardi'

2.Mohpa - main town which includes regular market for daily needs . 3.Mhasepathar - the word comes from platue (Pathar in Marathi) of mohpa, governed by grampanchayt.

Mohpa has an old Ram mandir. The mandir is having beautiful Ram panchayatan. It also has the Samadhi of a noble saint Shri. Tukaram Maharaj. Every navratri the local people witness a well planned utsav for all 9 days. Mohpa is famous for its bull market from past 50 years, although orange farm is the main identity of this town.

== Geography ==
Mohpa is located on a tributary of the Chandrabhaga River. It is 13 kilometres (8 mi) north-west of Kalmeshwar and 34 kilometres (21 mi) north-west of Nagpur. It has an average elevation of 351 metres (1151 feet).

== History ==
Before 1955, Mohpa was a panchayat village, but it was given municipal status that year,

== Demographics ==
As of 2001 India census, Mohpa had a population of 7,068. Males constituted 51% of the population and females 49%. Mohpa had an average literacy rate of 74%, higher than the national average of 59.5%: male literacy was 81%, and female literacy was 66%. In Mohpa, 11% of the population was under 6 years of age.

| Year | Male | Female | Total Population | Change | Religion (%) | | | | | | | |
| Year | Male | Female | Total Population | Change | Hindu | Muslim | Christian | Sikhs | Buddhist | Jain | Other religions and persuasions | Religion not stated |
|---|---|---|---|---|---|---|---|---|---|---|---|---|
| 2001 | 3583 | 3485 | 7068 | - | 88.809 | 4.740 | 0.014 | 0.014 | 6.324 | 0.000 | 0.085 | 0.014 |
| 2011 | 3520 | 3467 | 6987 | -1.146 | 87.749 | 5.367 | 0.014 | 0.186 | 6.441 | 0.086 | 0.157 | 0.000 |
