= Kondhali =

Village in Maharashtra

Kondhali कोंढाळी
- Town
- Location in Maharashtra, India Kondhali (India)
- Coordinates: 21°08′18″N 78°38′27″E
- Country: India
- State: Maharashtra
- District: Nagpur
- Taluka: Katol

Government
  - Type: urban area
  - Body: Kondhali Nagarpanchayat
- Elevation: 415 m (1,362 ft)

Population (2011)
  - Total: 11,418
  - Rank: One of the Biggest village of Nagpur District

Languages
  - Official: Marathi
- Time zone: UTC+5:30 (IST)
- PIN: 441103
- Vehicle registration: MH-40

Nagar panchayat Kondhali is a town located on National Highway No. 53 in the Nagpur District of Maharashtra, India. It lies about halfway between Talegaon and Nagpur on NH-6, at a distance of 61 km from Nagpur and 17 km from Katol.

== Demographics ==
As per 2011 census population of Kondhali is 11,418 of which 5,814 were male and 5,604 were female.

== Culture ==
As this town or small City is on National Highway people from every part of the country travel through Kondhali. Most of the people are Hindu, Buddhist Muslims as well as a few Christians and Sikhsa Buddhist. Kondhali is famous for Bhajia (Pyaj Pakode). It is also famous for the high school, Lakhotiya Bhutada High-school for its discipline and quality education having student capacity around 2000 students. Kondhali also have a senior arts and commerce college named ‘Late Rajendrasingh alias BABA Vyas Arts and Commerce College’, since 1993, which helps the locals to get the higher education at their door steps. Before the 1990s, facilities for higher education (Senior College) were not available in Kondhali and its surrounding rural areas. Due to this, rural students, especially young women, were forced to drop out of education. To solve this problem, the '''Sant Gulab Baba Education Society''' established the '''Late Rajendra Singh alias Baba Vyas Arts and Commerce College, Kondhali''' in the year 1994-95, named after him.

Rajendra Singh Vyas (known as Baba Vyas in the region) made a significant contribution. He worked specifically for the spread of higher education in rural and tribal areas. In his memory, the 'Late Rajendra Singh alias Baba Vyas Arts and Commerce College' was established in 1994-95, which is affiliated with Rashtrasant Tukadoji Maharaj Nagpur University. A social event, such as a blood donation camp, is organized in the area every year on his death anniversary.

== Education and Social Contribution ==
Rajendra Singh Vyas (popularly known as Baba Vyas in the region) played a significant role in the educational development of Kondhali. He worked specifically toward spreading higher education in rural and tribal areas.

In his memory, the Late Rajendra Singh alias Baba Vyas Arts and Commerce College was established in 1994-95, which is affiliated with Rashtrasant Tukadoji Maharaj Nagpur University. Every year on his death anniversary, social service activities such as blood donation camps are organized in the region.

== Administration ==
This is town of NCP Leader Akash Gajbe working in social and political field in all rural area. Kondhali is administered by a Nagar Panchayat. It is within the Katol Tehsil revenue circle of Nagpur District, the Katol Vidhan Sabha seat and the Ramtek Lok Sabha constituency.

Kondhali has a post office and police station.

== Transportation ==
Kondhali is well connected with Nagpur, Katol, Wardha, Amravati and other part of Maharashtra and country as NH-6 passing through Kondhali. MH SH Kondhali-Katol connecting Kondhali with Katol 17 km north of the village. Wardha is almost 58 km south of Kondhali.

MSRTC provides regular bus service from Kondhali to Katol, Nagpur, Wardha, Amravati and many more nearby places. Most of the Nagpur-Pune buses are passing through Kondhali.

The nearest railway station is Katol. The nearest airport, in 50 km distance, is Nagpur.
