= Badnera Junction railway station =

Railway station in Maharashtra, India

Badnera Junction
- Indian Railways logo

General information
- Location: Badnera, Amravati, Maharashtra; India
- Coordinates: 20°51′26″N 77°43′58″E
- Elevation: 300.800 metres (986.88 ft)
- System: Indian Railways junction station
- Owner: Indian Railways
- Operator: Central Railway
- Lines: Nagpur–Bhusawal section of Howrah–Nagpur–Mumbai line Amravati link, Narkhed–Amravati Railway line
- Platforms: 3 (Platform 4 temporarily unoperational due to platform widening and lengthening.)
- Tracks: 8

Construction
- Structure type: Standard, at ground
- Parking: Available

Other information
- Status: Functioning
- Station code: BD
- Zone(s): CR
- Division(s): Nagpur CR railway division

History
- Opened: 1867
- Electrified: 1989–91
- Former names: Great Indian Peninsula Railway
Location
- Location within India Location within Maharashtra

Badnera railway station serves Badnera, an area in Amravati city in the Indian state of Maharashtra. It is a junction station on the Howrah–Nagpur–Mumbai line. There is a 5 ft 6 in (1,676 mm) broad gauge line to Narkhed. Today, Badnera is a part of Amravati Municipal Corporation. City buses are also available from this railway station to many areas of Amravati city. This is one of the major junctions on the Mumbai–Howrah railway line. Badnera is a crew change point for all goods trains plying the Bhusaval–Nagpur line; in addition to that some Express trains get a crew change here as well. Badnera is the last station of Bhusaval Division of Central Railway so, many express trains get slack time here to reach Badnera at the right time. There is one branch line for Amravati which is for 9 km one of shortest branch lines in India. Badnera, New Amravati railway station are in Amravati Municipal Corporation, so connected well with Amravati city. Trains starting from Amravati to Nagpur do not touch Badnera due to a chord line which eliminates reversal at Badnera.

== History ==
The first train in India traveled from Mumbai to Thane on 16 April 1853. By May 1854, Great Indian Peninsula Railway's Bombay–Thane line was extended to Kalyan. Bhusawal railway station was set up in 1860 and in 1867 the GIPR branch line was extended to Nagpur.

=== Electrification ===
Railways in the Badnera area were electrified in 1989–91.

== Amenities ==
Amenities at Badnera railway station include: subscriber trunk dialling/public call office booth, waiting room, retiring room, and light refreshment stall.

== Gallery ==
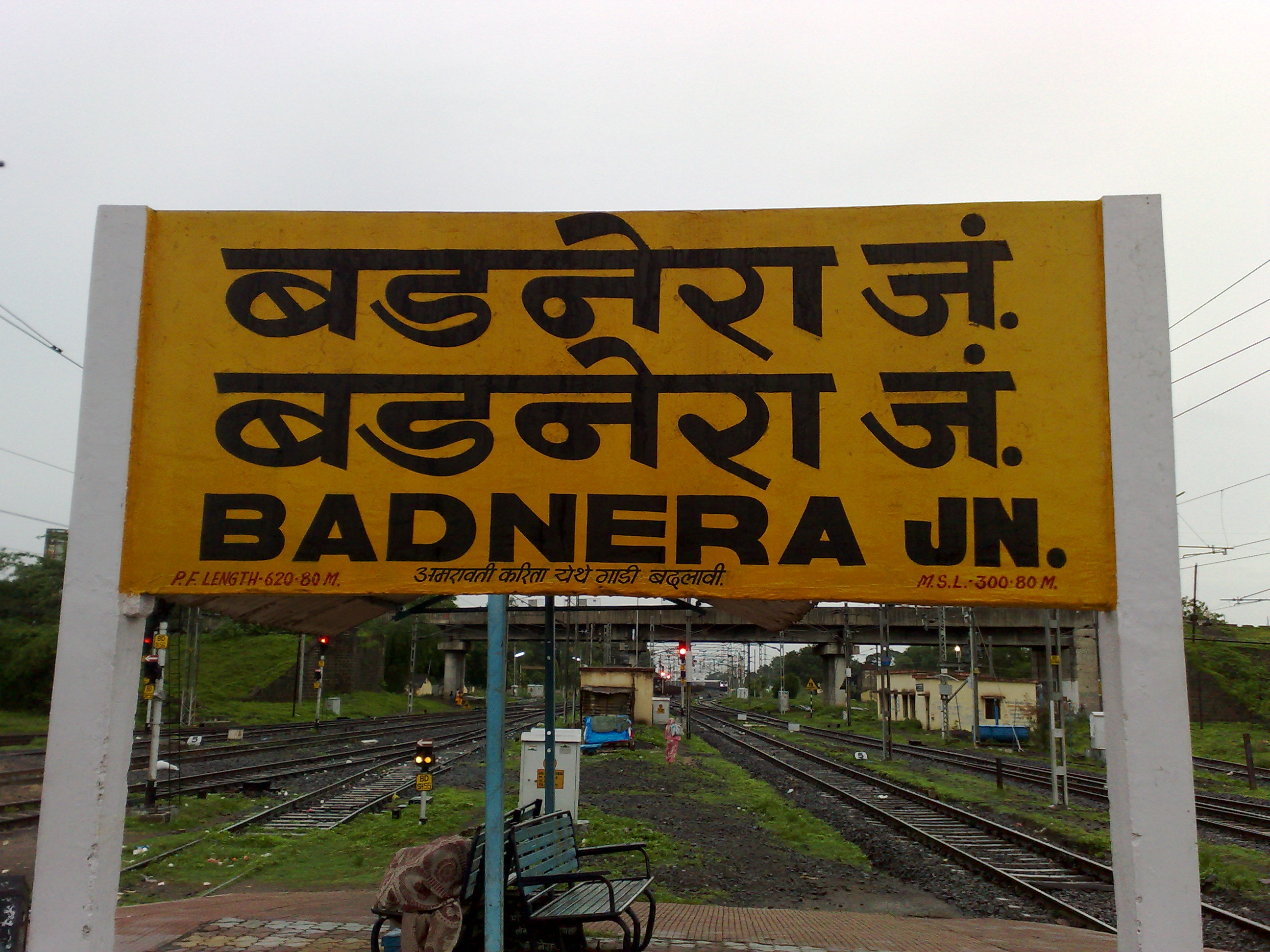
Badnera Junction

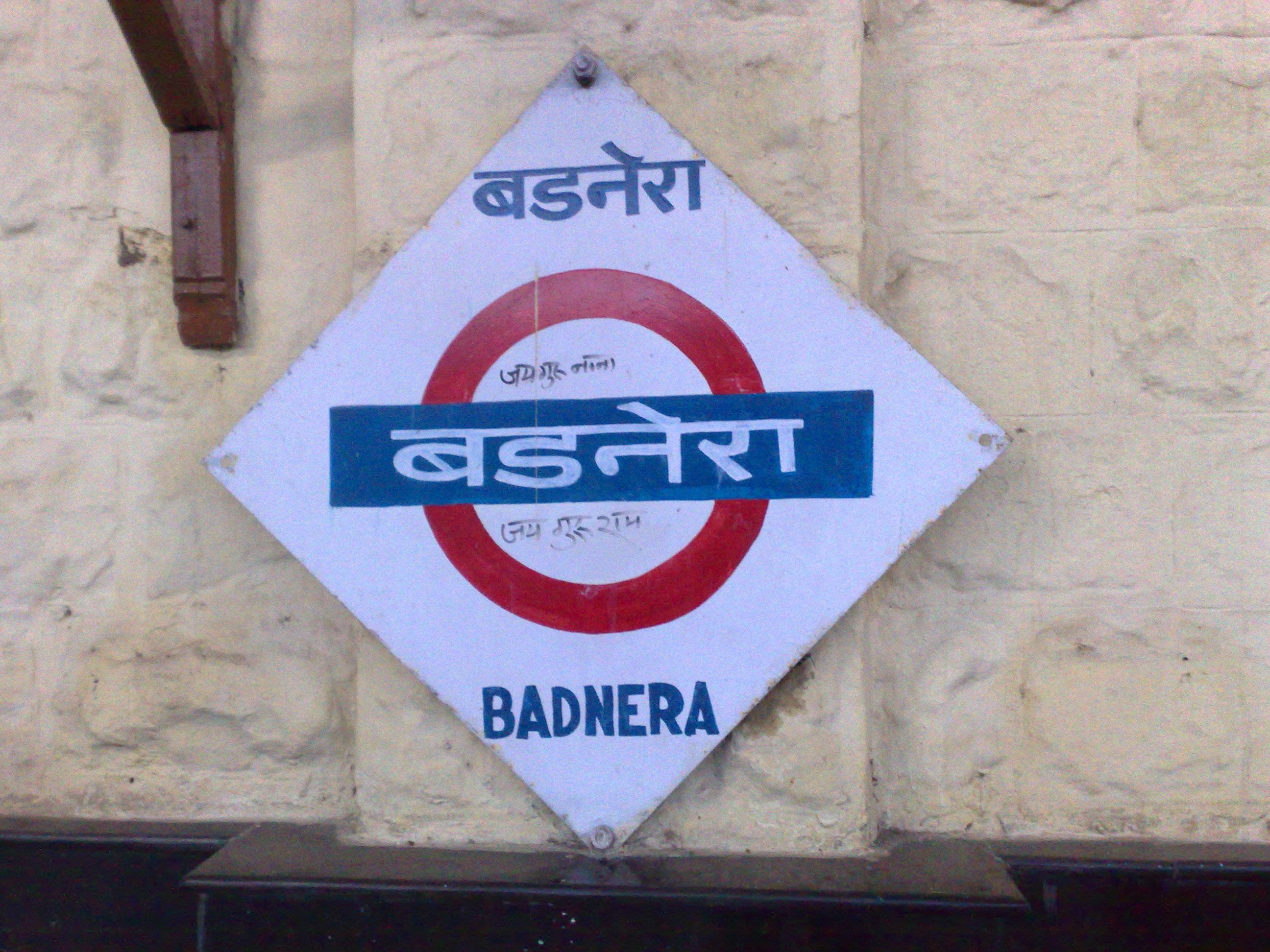
Badnera platform board

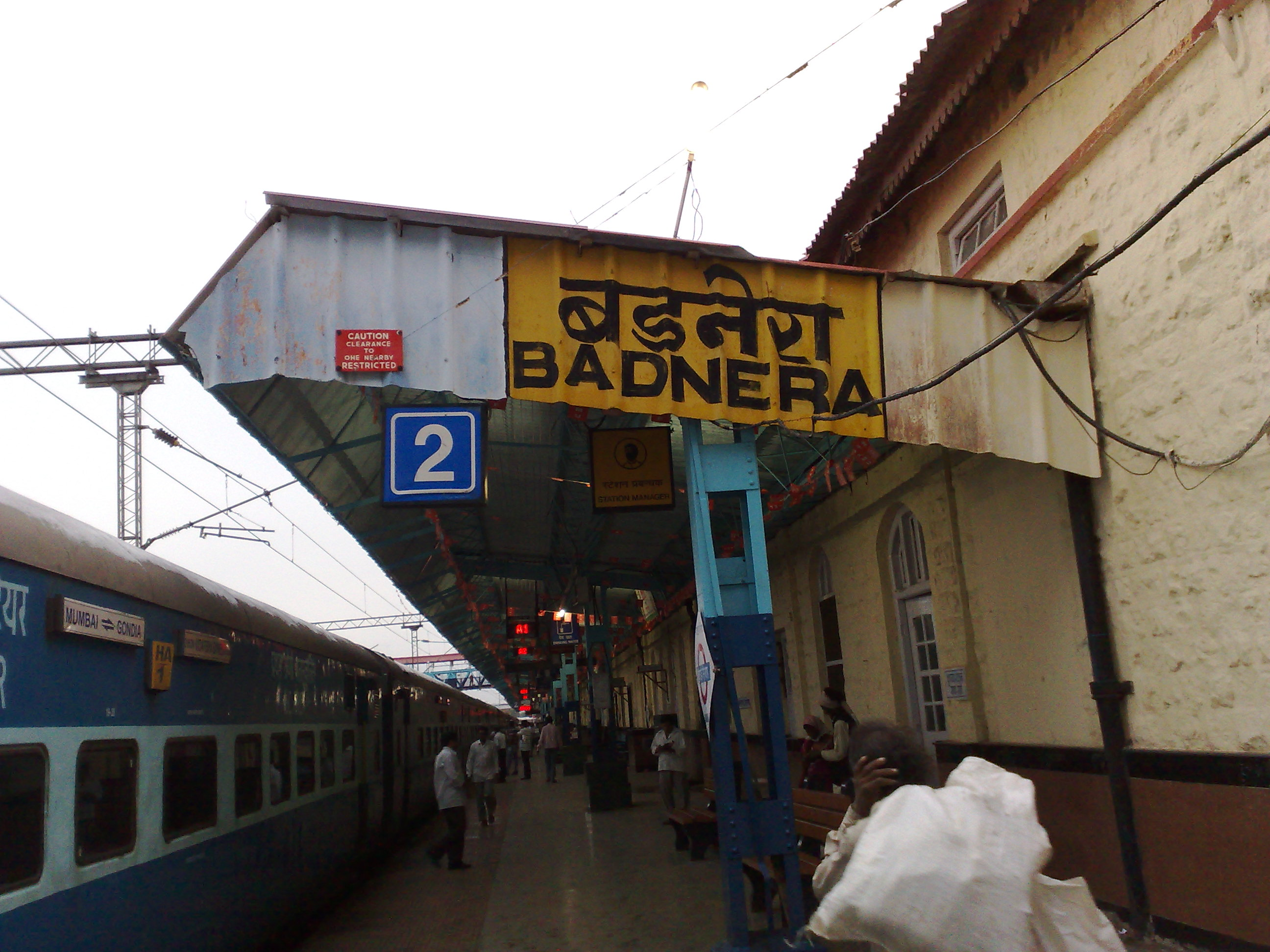
12105 Vidarbha Express at Badnera Junction

Preceding station	Indian Railways	Following station
Timtala towards ?	Central Railway zone Howrah–Nagpur–Mumbai line	Takli towards ?
Terminus	Central Railway zone Badnera–Amravati link line	Amravati towards ?
Terminus	Central Railway zone Badnera–Narkhed branch line	New Amravati towards ?
