= Darimeta railway station =

Railway station in Madhya Pradesh

Darimeta

General information
- Location: State Highway 246, Gujarkhedi, Chhindwara district, Madhya Pradesh; India
- Coordinates: 21.536803°N 78.5411°E
- Elevation: 470 metres (1,540 ft)
- System: Indian Railway Station
- Owner: Indian Railways
- Operator: West Central Railway
- Line: Bhopal–Nagpur section
- Platforms: 2
- Tracks: 2

Construction
- Structure type: Standard (on ground station)
- Parking: Yes
- Cycle facilities: No

Other information
- Status: Functioning
- Station code: DDMT
- Zone(s): West Central Railway
- Division(s): Nagpur CR

History
- Opened: 1884; 142 years ago

Services
| Preceding station | Indian Railways | Following station |
|---|---|---|
| Pandhurna towards Bhopal Junction | West Central Railway zone Bhopal–Nagpur section | Narkher Junction towards Nagpur Junction |
Location
- Location within India Location within Madhya Pradesh

Darimeta railway station is a railway station of Bhopal–Nagpur section under Nagpur CR railway division of West Central Railway zone of Indian Railways. The station is situated beside State Highway 246 at Gujarkhedi, Karvhar in Chhindwara district of Indian state of Madhya Pradesh.

== History ==
The Bhopal–Itarsi line was opened by the Begum of Bhopal in 1884. Itarsi and Nagpur Junction railway station was linked in between 1923 and 1924. Electrification started in Bhopal–Itarsi section in 1988–89 and the rest Itarsi to Nagpur section was electrified in 1990–91.
