= Bharatwada railway station =

Railway station in Maharashtra

Bharatwada

General information
- Location: Mahurzari, Bharatwada, Nagpur district, Maharashtra; India
- Coordinates: 21.231695°N 79.017108°E
- Elevation: 322 metres (1,056 ft)
- System: Indian Railway Station
- Owner: Indian Railways
- Operator: West Central Railway
- Line: Bhopal–Nagpur section
- Platforms: 2
- Tracks: 2

Construction
- Structure type: Standard (on ground station)
- Parking: No
- Cycle facilities: No

Other information
- Status: Functioning
- Station code: BWRA
- Zone(s): West Central Railway
- Division(s): Nagpur CR

History
- Opened: 1884; 142 years ago

Services
Preceding station	Indian Railways	Following station
Kalmeshwar towards Bhopal Junction	West Central Railway zone Bhopal–Nagpur section	Godhani towards Nagpur Junction
Location
- Location within India Location within Maharashtra

Bharatwada railway station is a railway station of Bhopal–Nagpur section under Nagpur CR railway division of West Central Railway zone of Indian Railways. The station is situated at Mahurzari, Bharatwada in Nagpur district in the Indian state of Maharashtra.

== History ==
The Bhopal–Itarsi line was opened by the Begum of Bhopal in 1884. Itarsi and Nagpur Junction railway station was linked in between 1923 and 1924. Electrification started in Bhopal–Itarsi section in 1988–89 and the rest Itarsi to Nagpur section was electrified in 1990–91.
