= State Highway 248 (Maharashtra) =

Road in Maharashtra, India

State Highway 248

Route information
- Maintained by MSRDC
- Length: 95 km (59 mi)

Major junctions
- From: Nagpur, Nagpur
- To: Warud, Amravati

Location
- Country: India
- State: Maharashtra
- Districts: Nagpur, Amravati
- Primary destinations: Nagpur, Kalmeshwar, Katol, Jalalkheda, Warud.

Highway system
- Roads in India; Expressways; National; State; Asian; State Highways in Maharashtra

Maharashtra State Highway 248 is a State highway that runs from Nagpur in north west direction through Nagpur, and touches Warud north east of Amravati districts in the state of Maharashtra. This state highway touches numerous cities and villages VIZ. Nagpur, Kalmeshwar, Katol, Jalalkheda and Warud.

== Major junctions ==
This highway started from the intersection at Chhawani Square in Nagpur with NH 69.

=== National highways ===
- NH 69 in Nagpur City

=== State highways ===
- MSH 10 at Warud
- MH SH 260 in Nagpur City
- MH SH 250 at Kalmeshwar
- MH SH 265 at Kalmeshwar and Dorli village
- MH SH 245 at Bharsinghi Village and Jalalkheda Village in Narkhed taluka
- MH SH 247 at Katol
- MH SH 244 at Warud

== Connections ==
Many villages, cities and towns in various districts are connecting by this state highway.

== See also ==
- List of state highways in Maharashtra
