= Karanja, Wardha =

Karanja (Ghadge)
- Tehesil town
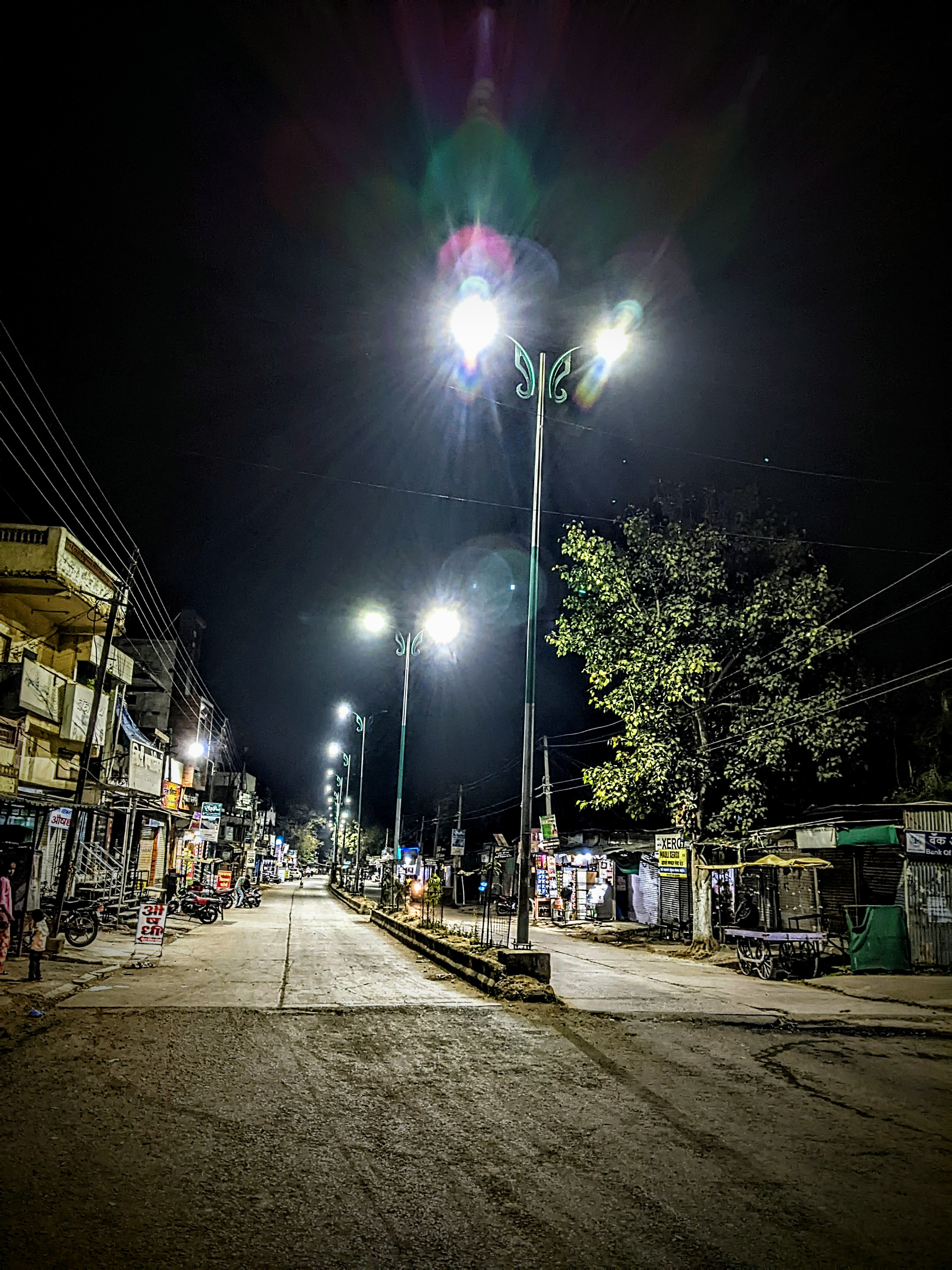
- Golibar Chowk at Karanja(gh)
- Interactive map of Karanja (Ghadge)
- Map showing location of Karanja (gh) Karanja (Ghadge) (India)
- Coordinates: 21°9′39.47″N 78°24′32.76″E
- Country: India
- State: Maharashtra
- Region: Vidarbha
- District: Wardha
- Total villages in Tehsil: 121

Government
  - Type: Nagar panchayat
  - Body: Karanja Nagar panchayat

Population (2011)
  - Total: 90,462

Languages
  - Official: Marathi
  - Other Languages: Hindi, English, Gujrati, Sindhi
- Time zone: UTC+5:30 (IST)
- Postal code: 442203
- Telephone code: 91-7156
- Vehicle registration: MH- 32 (Wardha District)
- Website: under construction

Karanja (Ghadge) is a tehsil town located within the Arvi subdivision and serves as a taluka (code 4961) in the Wardha district of Maharashtra, India.

== Governance ==
The tehsil comprises around 60 gram panchayats and 102 villages. In 2015, Karanja was designated as a Nagar Panchayat.

== Demographics ==
The majority of the population in Karanja consists of Hindus, with significant communities of Buddhists and Muslims also residing in the area.

== Agriculture ==
Karanja (Ghadge) and its surrounding areas are known for producing oranges, cotton, and soybean.

== Transport ==
Karanja is located on National Highway 53 (India), also known as Asian Highway (AH46) or National Highway 6 (India, under the old numbering system). It is approximately 76 km from Nagpur, 75 km from Amravati, and 70 km from Wardha, placing it almost at the center of these major cities. Due to its strategic location, it serves as a convenient rest stop for tourists, travelers, and transport services.
