= Warud Orange City railway station =

Railway station in Maharashtra, India

Warud Orange City station
- Indian Railways logo

General information
- Location: State Highway 244, Warud, Maharashtra; India
- Elevation: 391 metres (1,283 ft)
- System: Indian Railways station
- Owner: Indian Railways
- Operator: Central Railway
- Platforms: 1
- Tracks: 3

Construction
- Structure type: Standard (on-ground station)
- Parking: Yes
- Cycle facilities: No

Other information
- Status: Active
- Station code: WOC
- Zone(s): Central Railway
- Division(s): Nagpur CR

History
- Opened: 2012

Passengers
- 10,000 (yes)
Location
- Location within India Location within Maharashtra

Warud Orange City railway station is a small railway station in Amravati district, Maharashtra. Its code is WOC. It serves Warud Town. The station consists of one platform.
