= Narkhed =

- City
- Location in Maharashtra, India Narkhed (India)
- Coordinates: 21°26′18″N 78°34′06″E
- Country: India
- State: Maharashtra
- District: Nagpur

Government
  - Type: Municipal Council
  - Body: Narkhed Municipal Council

Area
  - Total: 3.96 km^{2} (1.53 sq mi)
- Elevation: 398 m (1,306 ft)

Population (2011)
  - Total: 21,227
  - Density: 5,360/km^{2} (13,900/sq mi)

Language
  - Official: Marathi
- Time zone: UTC+5:30 (IST)
- PIN: 441304
- STD Code: 07105
- Vehicle registration: MH-40

Narkhed is a town and a municipal council in Nagpur district in the Indian state of Maharashtra. It is about 87 km north-west of Nagpur. It is the administrative headquarters of Narkhed taluka, one of the 14 talukas of this district. It is located in the "orange belt" and is a major center for orange-trading.

== Demographics ==
As of the 2001 India census, Narkhed had a population of 21,536. Males constitute 51% of the population and females 49%. Narkhed has an average literacy rate of 72%, higher than the national average of 59.5%: male literacy is 77%, and female literacy is 67%. In Narkhed, 12% of the population is under 6 years of age.

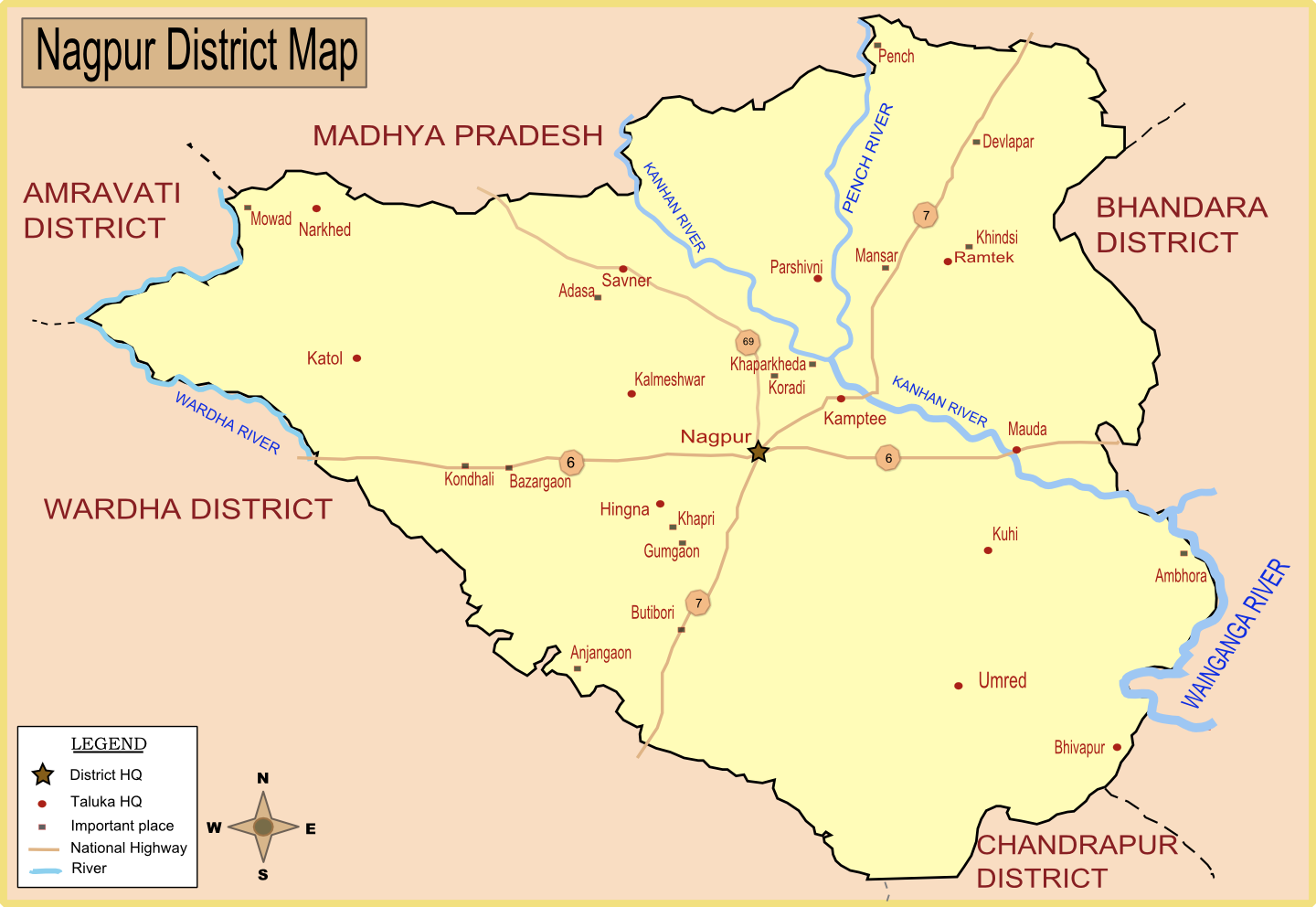
Map of Nagpur district with major towns(including Narkhed) and rivers.

Year	Male	Female	Total Population	Change	Religion (%)							
Year	Male	Female	Total Population	Change	Hindu	Muslim	Christian	Sikhs	Buddhist	Jain	Other religions and persuasions	Religion not stated
2001	11060	10477	21537	-	78.692	9.950	0.060	0.060	10.754	0.483	0.000	0.000
2011	10807	10320	21127	-1.904	78.634	10.205	0.057	0.009	10.621	0.284	0.166	0.024

== Culture ==
Festivals include Holi, Diwali, Dasara, Pola. Melas take place on Holi, Dasara and Pola. Ganesh Utsav and Navratras Mela are famous in nearby Eid, Christmas and New Year are celebrated.

== Climate ==
The climate is hot and humid. About 100–120 cm rainfall occur each year. In winter the average minimum temperature is about 9-15 °C. In summer the average maximum temperature is about 38-45 °C.

== Administration ==
The governing body for Narkhed city is the Municipal council. The 17 wards each elect a corporator. A separate election takes place for Mayor. Shri Abhijeet Ramesh Gupta is the Mayor. His grandfather, the late Shri Balmukundji Gupta, was the founding Mayor of the Narkhed Municipal Council, and his father, the late Shri Ramesh Balmukundji Gupta, was Mayor for 22 years.

Mayors and councillors are responsible developmental work in their wards. Different committees supervise different works.

Narkhed is the taluka headquarters and Panchayat Samiti. 138 villages come under Narkhed taluka with 70 Gram Panchayats. Narkhed is under Katol Vidhan Sabha seat and Ramtek Lok Sabha constituency.

== Court ==
There is Judicial Magistrate First Class (JMFC) Court at Narkhed having around 20 lawyers. Adv. Sadhana S. Badiye is the first woman to join the Narkhed court as a lawyer in the year 1990.

== Economy ==
The economy of Narkhed depends primarily on agriculture. Commercial activities increase during orange season.

=== Agriculture ===
Narkhed is a major producer of oranges. Cash crops other than orange include cotton, soybeans, wheat, jowar, and rice. Tul, Moong and Harbara cultivate in the taluka. Because of the demand for vegetables in Nagpur, market farmers grow vegetables throughout the year. Rabi and kharif have taken in Narkhed.

== Irrigation ==
Agriculture mostly depends on rainfall. Farmers supplement with wells, river water, irrigation dams and canals. Pimpalgoan Wakhaji is the biggest irrigation dam. Other irrigation dams include Kar dam, Paradsinga dam, Ambada dam. Rivers including Wardha, Jam, Mandakini, Wandali and Kolar are used for irrigation of the Rabi crop, but farmers face serious water problems in summer making it difficult to maintain orange orchards.

== Transport ==
Narkhed is connected with Nagpur by good roads via Katol and Saoner, as well as by Warud, Multai, Pandhurna, Pusla, Shendurjana, Badchicholi, Seoni and others. MH SH 246 Sawargoan-Narkhed-Mowad passes through Narkhed. Its villages are connected by roads.

=== Bus ===
MSRTC buses services reach Katol, Mowad, Sawargoan and Jalalkheda. Buses connect Nagpur, Saoner, Warud, Morshi, Karanja.

=== Rail ===
Narkhed town is on the Chennai-New Delhi Grand trunk route. It directly connects with Amravati by rail. The 138 km Narkhed-Amravati Railway line connects Narkhed with Warud, Morshi, Chandur Bazar and Amravati. All those places are in the orange producing belt, hence it provides connectivity and markets to orange producing farmers. Amravati city is about 10 km from the Howrah-Nagpur-Mumbai line connecting with Delhi, Mumbai, Chennai, Hyderabad, Bangalore, Pune, Nagpur, Kolhapur, Bhopal, Harda, Indore, Patna, Ernakulam, Amritsar, Nanded, Jabalpur, Jaipur, Raipur, Hinganghat and Bhusaval. 18-20 trains have daily stops in Narkher Junction railway station.
