= Warud =

Town in Maharashtra, India

- Town
- Nickname: California of Vidharbha
- Location in Maharashtra, India
- Coordinates: 21°25′0″N 78°24′0″E
- Country: India
- State: Maharashtra
- District: Amravati

Government
  - Type: Municipal Council
  - Body: Warud Municipal Council
  - Member of Legislative Assembly: Chandu Atmaramji Yawalkar (BJP)
  - MP: Amar Sharadrao Kale (NCP)
- Elevation: 392 m (1,286 ft)

Population (2011)
  - Total: 45,482
  - Rank: 1st in district

Languages
  - Official: Marathi
- Time zone: UTC+5:30 (IST)
- PIN: 444906
- Telephone code: 07229
- Vehicle registration: MH-27 (Amravati)

Warud is a town and municipal council in Amravati district in the Indian state of Maharashtra. It is known as the "Orange City".

== Demographics ==
As of 2011 Indian Census, Warud had a total population of 45,482, of which 23,182 were males and 22,300 were females. Population within the age group of 0 to 6 years was 4,413. The total number of literates in Warud was 37,422, which constituted 82.3% of the population with male literacy of 84.2% and female literacy of 80.2%. The effective literacy rate of 7+ population of Warud was 91.1%, of which male literacy rate was 93.8% and female literacy rate was 88.4%. The Scheduled Castes and Scheduled Tribes population was 4,952 and 3,409 respectively. Warud had 9957 households in 2011.

Year	Male	Female	Total Population	Change	Religion (%)							
Year	Male	Female	Total Population	Change	Hindu	Muslim	Christian	Sikhs	Buddhist	Jain	Other religions and persuasions	Religion not stated
2001	20944	20061	41005	-	72.216	19.037	0.217	0.695	6.487	0.858	0.471	0.020
2011	23182	22300	45482	0.109	71.879	19.647	0.290	0.737	6.572	0.682	0.004	0.189

== Transportation ==
=== Railway ===
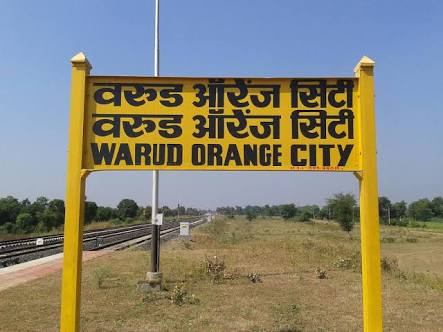
Warud Orange City (WOC) Railway Station Board

Narkhed and Amravati towns in Maharashtra's orange belt have waited for more than 80 years to be linked by rail. The 140-km track was first sanctioned in 1928 under the British, but stayed on the backburner. The project was revived only in 1993–94 and a budget of Rs 2.84 billion approved.

The then Prime Minister P.V. Narasimha Rao laid the foundation stone. But protests by the Shiv Sena, which opposed the displacement of people, stalled the project for many more years.

In September 2008, when President Pratibha Patil inaugurated the New Amravati railway station, it seemed as if the project would be completed soon. Far from it. In November 2009, the Railway Ministry announced the link would be inaugurated in December 2010.

Narkhed-Amravati line is ready in January 2014. Railways are now available to travel from Narkhed to Bhusaval. Warud Orange City railway station is 3 km from the centre of the Warud.

The Amravati - Chandur Bazar - Morshi - Warud Orange City - Narkher railway track is electrified. People of Warud can travel by train to cities like Amravati, Akola, Shegaon, Bhusawal, Washim, Hingoli, Nanded, Hyderabad, Narkher, Morshi, Chandur Bazar, Badnera, Indore, Bhopal, Bangalore, Jaipur, Itarsi

=== Roadways ===
There is a Warud MSRTC Depot of Maharashtra State Transport (S.T. Bus) in Warud. It has better connectivity with neighbouring towns and districts Amaravati, Akola, Nagpur, Yavatmal and Wardha. Buses for neighbouring state Madhya Pradesh are also available.

== Agriculture ==
Shendurjana Ghat, Loni, Jarud, Jamgaon, Pusla, Isambri, Bahada, Tembhurkheda and Jamthi are the main exporters of oranges in Warud taluka. That is why it is also known as "Orange City" or California of India. Warud has an agriculture-based economy.

== Places of attraction ==
- Zunj waterfall on River Wardha.
- Shri Kshetra Gavhankund.
- Shri Kshetra Musalkheda philgimage of Saint Yashwant Maharaj
- Vedhapur philgrimage of Lord Hanuman-ji.
- Shri Kshetra Nagthana and Nagthana Dam built on Chudaman river.
- Chakri ghat: Ghat located in Satpura mountains about 8.50 kilometer away from Warud bus station.
