= New Amravati railway station =

Railway station in Maharashtra, India

New Amravati
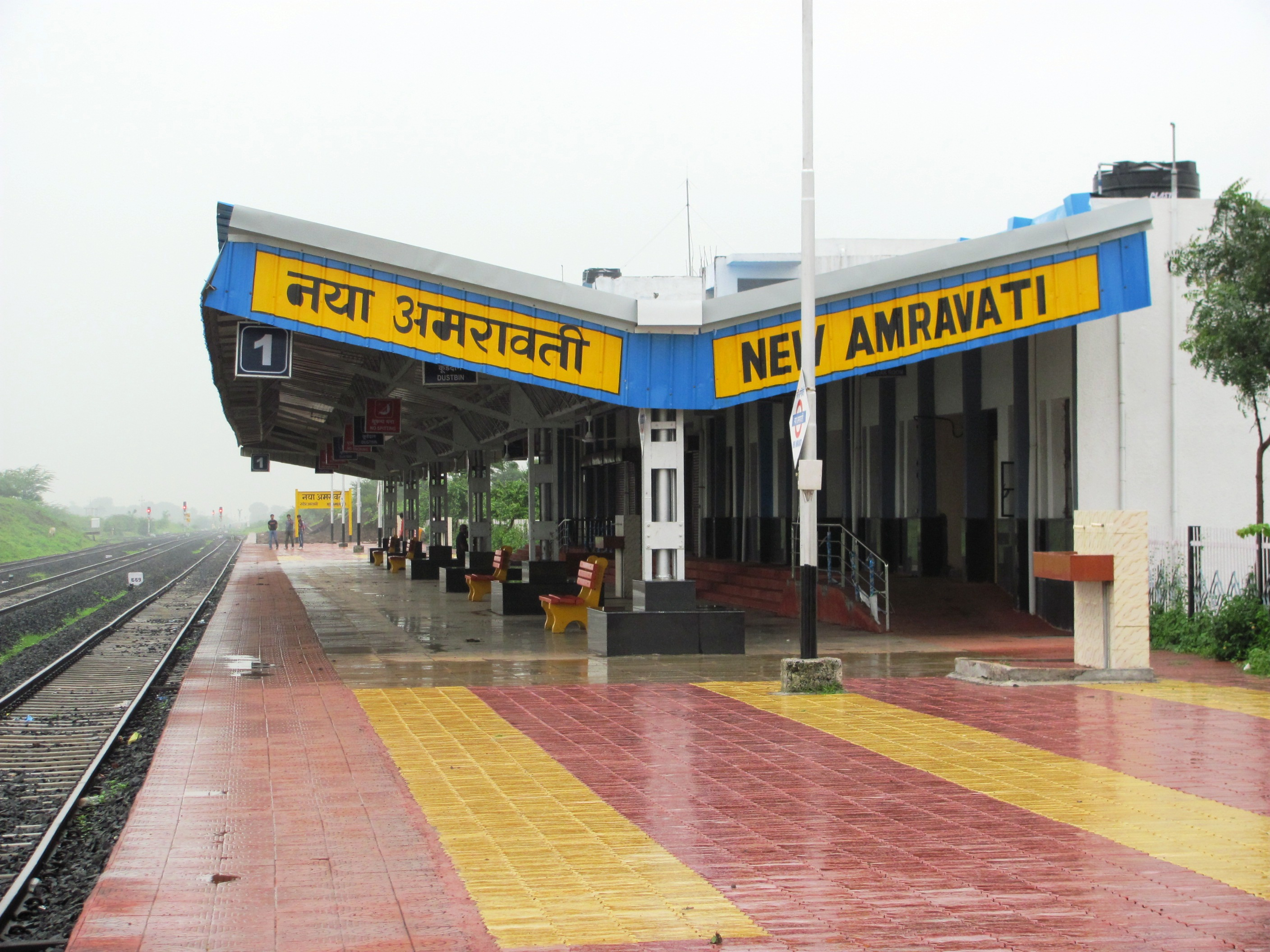
- New Amravati station platform

General information
- Location: Amravati, Maharashtra; India
- Coordinates: 20.9030°N 77.7328°E
- Elevation: 334 m (1,096 ft)
- System: Indian Railways
- Owner: Indian Railways
- Line: Narkher–Badnera line
- Platforms: 1
- Tracks: 3
- Connections: Taxi stand, auto stand

Construction
- Structure type: Standard (on ground station)
- Parking: Available
- Cycle facilities: Available
- Accessible: Disabled access

Other information
- Station code: NAVI
- Fare zone: Central Railway zone

History
- Opened: 2011; 15 years ago
- Electrified: 2011; 15 years ago

Services
Preceding station	Indian Railways	Following station
Badnera towards ?	Central Railway zone Badnera–Narkhed branch line	Walgaon towards ?
Location
- Location within India Location within Maharashtra

New Amravati railway station is a third railway station in Amravati city of Maharashtra. The other two are Badnera Junction and Amravati city terminal station. Its code is NAVI. This serves West side of city and connects to Narkhed station for trains from Badnera to Narkhed. New Amravati station has trains to Jabalpur and Kacheguda.

== Infrastructure ==
The station building was inaugurated in December 2011.

== Location ==
The main railway station of the city, Amravati railway station, is nearby to this station. This station is deemed suitable for local travelling within Amravati City.

== Train services ==
This station is served by a total of 10 trains.

1) 61105/61106 Badnera ⇔ Narkhed MEMU 2) 61103/61104 Badnera ⇔ Narkhed MEMU 3) 17641/17642 Kacheguda ⇔ Narkhed Express 4) 19301/19302 Dr. Ambedkar Nagar ⇔ Yesvantpur Express 5) 19713/19714 Jaipur Junction ⇔ Kurnool City Express
