= Narkher Junction railway station =

Railway station in Maharashtra

Narkher Junction

General information
- Location: State Highway 246, Narkhed, Nagpur district, Maharashtra; India
- Coordinates: 21.468725°N 78.524814°E
- Elevation: 411 metres (1,348 ft)
- System: Indian Railway Station
- Owner: Indian Railways
- Operator: Central Railway
- Line: Bhopal–Nagpur section
- Platforms: 4
- Tracks: 2

Construction
- Structure type: Standard (on ground station)
- Parking: Yes
- Cycle facilities: No

Other information
- Status: Functioning
- Station code: NRKR
- Zone(s): Central Railway
- Division(s): Nagpur CR

History
- Opened: 1884; 142 years ago

Services
Preceding station	Indian Railways	Following station
Darimeta towards Bhopal Junction	West Central Railway zone Bhopal–Nagpur section	Tinkheda towards Nagpur Junction
Location
- Location within India Location within Maharashtra

Narkher Junction railway station is a railway junction station of Bhopal–Nagpur section under Nagpur CR railway division of Central Railway Zone of Indian Railways. The station is situated beside State Highway 246 at Narkhed in Nagpur district in the Indian state of Maharashtra.

== History ==
The Bhopal–Itarsi line was opened by the Begum of Bhopal in 1884. Itarsi and Nagpur Junction railway station was linked in between 1923 and 1924. Electrification started in Bhopal–Itarsi section in 1988–89 and the rest Itarsi to Nagpur section was electrified in 1990–91.
