= Shendurjana Ghat =

- town
- Location in Maharashtra, India
- Coordinates: 21.521681°N 78.290834°E
- Country: India
- State: Maharashtra
- District: Amravati

Population (2011)
  - Total: 21,748

Languages
  - Official: Marathi
- Time zone: UTC+5:30 (IST)
- PIN: 444907
- Telephone STD code: 07229
- Vehicle registration: MH-27

Shendurjana Ghat is a town of Warud Tehsil, Amravati district, Maharashtra, India.

== Demographics ==
At the 2011 India census, Shendurjana Ghat had a population of 21748. Males constituted 52% of the population and females 48%. Shendurjana had an average literacy rate of 75%, higher than the national average of 59.5%: male literacy was 79%, and female literacy 70%. In Shendurjana, 12% of the population were under six years of age.

Year	Male	Female	Total Population	Change	Religion (%)							
Year	Male	Female	Total Population	Change	Hindu	Muslim	Christian	Sikhs	Buddhist	Jain	Other religions and persuasions	Religion not stated
2001	10913	10170	21083	-	70.085	18.479	0.081	0.028	9.505	1.214	0.531	0.076
2011	11227	10521	21748	3.154	68.512	20.200	0.028	0.060	8.856	1.140	1.163	0.041

== Agriculture ==
Main agricultural produce of this town is Nagpur Oranges. Approx 90% farmers here are Orange producers. Along with Oranges, orange saplings or plants are created and sold nationwide from this town.

Shendurjana Ghat is having its unique identity as a producer of Orange plants (Panheri), Mosambi and Lemon plants which is created by budding of orange bud on Jambheri, Rangpuri or Alemow rootstock. These plants are then purchased by farmers from Rajasthan, Madhya Pradesh and Maharashtra. Annually approximately 10 to 15 million plants are sold from Shendurjana Ghat market in the months of July to September.

Shendurjana Ghat is famous for producing best quality of Nagpur oranges and Nagpur Oranges are famous for its unique sweet and sour taste. Nagpur Oranges are mainly produced in Warud, Morshi, Chandur Bazaar and Paratwada tehsils of Amravati District. Warud-Morshi tehsil is known as the California of Vidarbha because of largest production of oranges, in which Shendurjana Ghat contributes more than 30% of production. Every year millions of tonnes of oranges are exported from this town to different Indian states and Asian countries like Bangladesh, Pakistan, Nepal, Bhutan, etc.

Farmers here also produce crops and vegetables like cotton, red gram, peas, green gram, soybeans, beans, brinjals, tomatoes, etc.

Previously Shendurjana Ghat town was known for its larger production and market of green chillies, red chillies and turmeric tubers. Currently, very few farmers produce chillies and turmeric because of higher production cost, increased labour costs, uncontrollable insects, pests and scarcity of water.
