= Katol taluka =

Katol taluka is a taluka in Katol subdivision of Nagpur district in Maharashtra state, India. It covers an area of 9,017 hectares, and as of 2001 had a population of 155,668, of whom 37,435 were urban dwellers, and 118,233 were rural. The administrative center of the taluka is the city of Katol.

== History ==
In 1901 Katol taluka was one of four talukas in Nagpur district. It covered 800 square miles and had a population of 162,588.

Year	Male	Female	Total Population	Change	Religion (%)							
Year	Male	Female	Total Population	Change	Hindu	Muslim	Christian	Sikhs	Buddhist	Jain	Other religions and persuasions	Religion not stated
2001	80303	75365	155668	-	84.350	3.808	0.094	0.165	11.209	0.261	0.080	0.033
2011	83917	79891	163808	5.229	84.931	3.922	0.134	0.247	10.426	0.243	0.007	0.090

== Panchayat villages ==
Katol taluka is divided into eighty-three panchayat villages, each of which oversees one or more villages. The panchayat villages are:

- Ambala (SO)
- Anjangaon
- Bhorgad
- Bihalgondi
- Bori
- Chandanpardi
- Chargaon
- Chikhalagad
- Chikhali (MA)
- Chikhali (MALO)
- Dharatwada
- Dhawalapur
- Dhotiwada
- Dhurkheda
- Digras (BU)
- Dodki
- Dongargaon
- Dorli (BHA)
- Dorli (BHI)
- Dudhala
- Esapur (BU)
- Esapur (KH)
- Fetri
- Ganeshpur
- Gangaldoh
- Garamsur
- Ghubdi
- Gondi (MOH)
- Gondidigras
- Gonhi
- Hatla
- Junapani
- Kachari (SA)
- Kalambha
- Kamptee (Kamthi)
- Katalabodi
- Khamli
- Khandala (KH)
- Khangaon
- Khapri (Baro)
- Khari (KH)
- Khursapar
- Khutamba
- Kohla
- Kondhali
- Kondhasaoli
- Kotwalbardi
- Ladgaon
- Linga
- Malegaon
- Maragsur
- Masli
- Masod
- Mendhaki
- Mendhepathar
- Metpanjra
- Miniwada
- Murti
- Nandora
- Panchadhar
- Pandhardhakni
- Panjrakate
- Panwadi
- Paradsinga
- Pardi (Got)
- Pusagondi
- Rajni
- Raulgaon
- Ridhora
- Ringanabodi
- Sabkund
- Sirsawadi
- Sonkhamb
- Sonoli
- Tapni
- Wadhona
- Wai (KU)
- Wajbodi
- Wandali(KH)
- Wandliwagh
- Yenwa
- Yerla (Dhote)
- Zilpa
