= Kalameshwar =

Kalameshwar Bramhani
- city
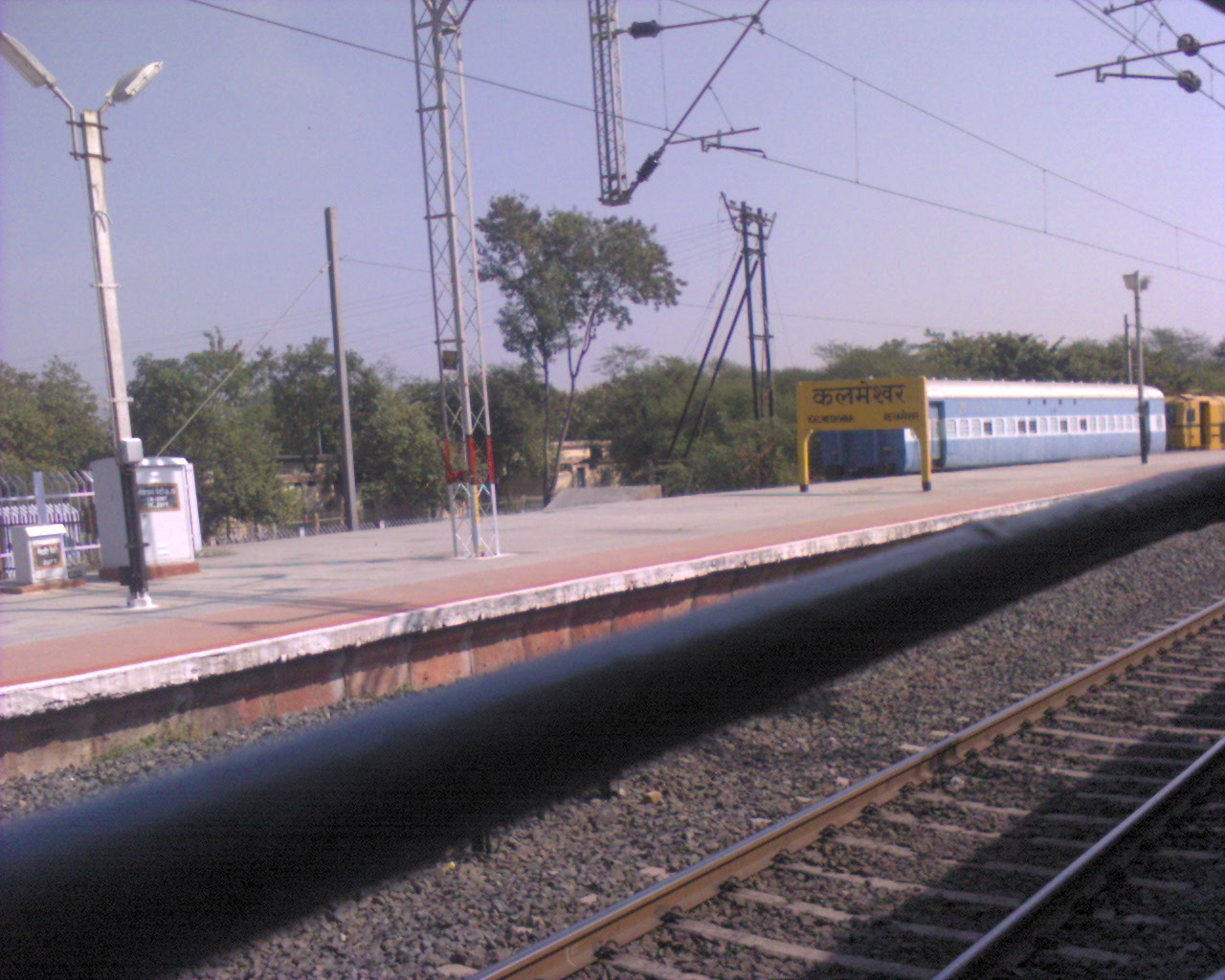
- Kalameshwar railway station

- Location in Maharashtra, India
- Coordinates: 21.2321022°N 78.9179599°E
- Country: India
- State: Maharashtra
- District: Nagpur
- Established: 1865

Government
  - Type: Municipal Council
  - Body: Kalameshwar-Bramhani
- Elevation: 330 m (1,080 ft)

Population (2011)
  - Total: 17,241
- Demonym: Nagpurkar

Languages
  - Official: Marathi
- Time zone: UTC+5:30 (IST)
- PIN: 441501
- Vehicle registration: MH-40
- Website: www.mckalmeshwar.org/

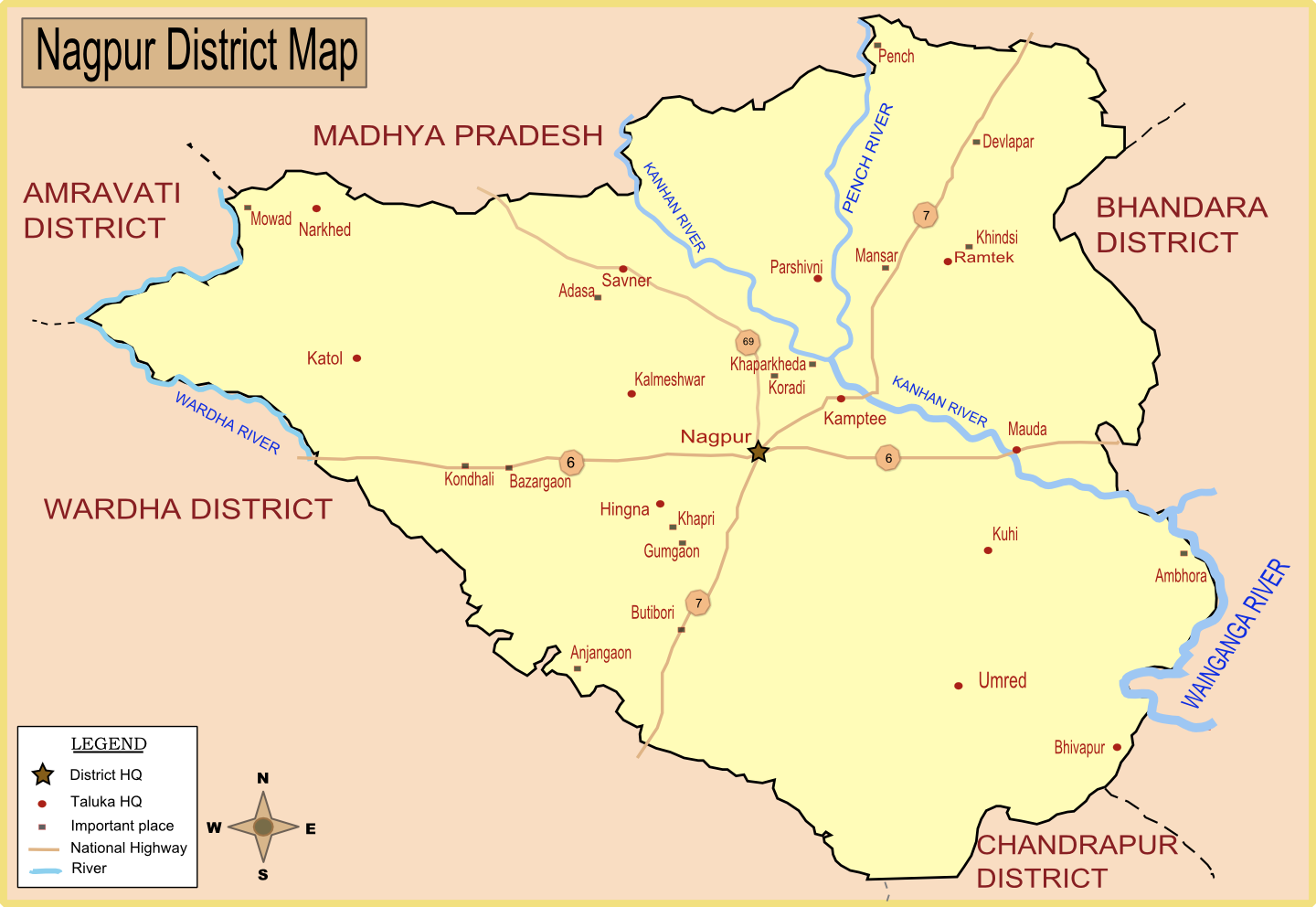
Map of Nagpur district showing Kalmeshwar.

Kalameshwar-Bramhani is a city and a municipal council also a major Industrial hub in Nagpur district in the Indian state of Maharashtra. It is connected to National Highways NH-353I, NH-353J and NH-547E.

== Demographics ==
As of 2001 India census, Kalmeshwar had a population of 17,241. Males constitute 52% of the population and females 48%. Kalmeshwar has an average literacy rate of 77%, higher than the national average of 59.5%: male literacy is 82%, and female literacy is 71%. In Kalmeshwar, 13% of the population is under 6 years of age.

Year	Male	Female	Total Population	Change	Religion (%)							
Year	Male	Female	Total Population	Change	Hindu	Muslim	Christian	Sikhs	Buddhist	Jain	Other religions and persuasions	Religion not stated
2001	9052	8279	17331	-	90.566	3.150	0.340	0.496	5.256	0.190	0.000	0.000
2011	10047	9531	19578	12.965	88.472	3.826	0.306	0.725	6.579	0.077	0.000	0.015

== Culture ==
Kalmeshwar (Marathi: कळमेश्वर) Name after the god Kadambeshwar (Mahadev). Kalmeshwar is an industrial town. Hence, people from various part of the country living here. Dhapewada and Adasa are two important tourist places near Kalmeshwar.

== Politics ==
Minister for Road Transport & Highways, Shipping and Water Resources, River Development & Ganga Rejuvenation in the Government of India. Sri. Nitin Gadkari hails from the Kalmeshwar Taluka. Sri. Seshrao Krishnarao Wankhede was a cricket administrator and politician also hails from the Kalmeshwar taluka. Wankhede cricket Stadium a prominent international cricketing venue build in Mumbai under his leadership, which is named after him.

== Administration ==
The governing body for Kalmeshwar city is Municipal council [4] There are 17 wards in Kalmeshwar city from which 17 cooperators are elected by people.[5] In the same way separate election takes place for the post of Mayor. Mayor has been getting elected directly by people and then he/she needs to prove the majority of cooperators. Recently gram panchayat Bramhani and kalmeshwar are merged, Population of kalmeshwar increased more than 70000 (Approx) Cooperators are responsible for all the developmental work in their wards. There are different committees for different work.

Kalmeshwar is also the taluka headquarter and Panchayat Samiti. There are 106 villages under Kalmeshwar taluka and 51 Gram Panchayats. Kalmeshwar is under Saoner Vidhan Sabha constituency and Ramtek Lok Sabha constituency.

== Industry, Agriculture and Economy ==
Kalmeshwar MIDC has almost 150 industrial plot.

- JSW Steel
- KTM Textile
- ESAB India Ltd
- ZIM Pharma ltd
- Taj Industries Pvt. Ltd.
- Ankur Seeds Pvt. Ltd
- Metlok Pvt. Ltd.
- Unijuels life sciences
- Chemfield Pharmaceuticals private ltd.
- Minex Injection Product Private Ltd.
- Minex Metallurgical co pvt ltd.
- Porohit Textile
- Ats Pharma
- Cipla Pharma

In December 2018, Central Railway (CR) proposed a LHB plant at Kalmeshwar of investment of Rs.500 Cr, which has the potential to garner 700 direct and 2000 indirect employment, moved to Bhusawal, due land acquisition issue. This is widely seen as a major setback not only for the industrial town but for the Vidarbha region.

Agricultural is well developed in town, though they don't have any surface irrigation facility and groundwater condition not so good in the region. Local farmers are the main supplier of vegetable and milk to the Nagpur city, especially cabbage.

Once very famous for its orange market, however due to continuous bad orange harvest and change in weather pattern, farmer stop growing the oranges. Eventually the famous orange market completely diminished.

== Transport ==
Kalmeshwar is just 25 km from Nagpur in north-west direction and hence directly connected with Nagpur by road and railway. NH-353J Nagpur-Katol-Warud is passing through Kalmeshwar town. NH 547E Kalmeshwar-Gondkhari connecting Kalmeshwar with National Highway 6 (India, old numbering), 12 km south of the city. Hence this highway provide connectivity with Hingna MIDC as well as Butibori MIDC through Outer Ring Road. MH SH Kalmeshwar-Savner connecting Kalmeshwar with Savner and NH 69.

Kalmeshwar is connected to the rest of Maharashtra by railway network. Kalmeshwar railway station is situated in the town outskirt.

Kalmeshwar is also connected with the buses of state transport(MSRTC). All the buses on the way to Katol and Warud stops here. Regular buses are running between Nagpur, Katol, Savner, Dapewada, Mohapa, Gondkhari etc.

Nagpur city bus service (i.e. STAR BUS) is also available from Nagpur at regular interval.

== Education Facilities ==
Kalmeshwar comes under Nagpur metropolitan area and hence large number of educational institutes exist in the Kalmeshwar area.

Institutes near Kalmeshwar include-

- K.Z.S.Science College, Bramhani, Kalmeshwar.
- Jindal Vidya Mandir - CBSE school run by JSW Steel for local community as a CSR activity.
- Institute of Management Technology, Nagpur.
- Guru Nanak Institute Of Engineering and Technology at Dahegoan village.
- NUVA College of Engineering and Technology.
- Nagar parishad high school kalmeshwar.
- Carmel Academy Higher Secondary School (CBSE) Waroda, Kalmeshwar.
- Municipal Highschool and Junior college, Kalmeshwar.
- Pratap Madhyamik Vidyalaya Kalmeshwar.
- Indira Madhyamik Vidyalaya Kalmeshwar.
- Jain International School Fetari (8 km from Kalmeshwar).
- Jain Institute of Engineering and Technology, Fetari (8 km from Kalmeshwar).
- Shriram Jr. College Sonegaon (8 km from Kalmeshwar).
- Saumya Academy kalmeshwar. (Private Coaching institute)
- Podar International School, Fetari (6 km from Kalmeshwar).
- Regent High School, Kalmeshwar(added by Kavish)
