= Mowad =

- city
- Location in Maharashtra, India
- Coordinates: 21.4674471°N 78.4479618°E
- Country: India
- State: Maharashtra
- District: Nagpur

Government
  - Type: Municipal Council
  - Body: Mowad Municipal Council

Area
  - Total: 450 km^{2} (170 sq mi)

Population (2011)
  - Total: 8,732
  - Density: 19/km^{2} (50/sq mi)

Languages
  - Official: Marathi
- Time zone: UTC+5:30 (IST)

Mowad is a town and a municipal council in Nagpur district of Maharashtra, India. The town is located on the Wardha River.

== Demographics ==
As of 2011, Mowad had a population of 8777. Males constitute 51% of the population and females 49%. Mowad has an average literacy rate of 74%, higher than the national average of 59.5%. The literacy rate is 79% for males and 68% for female. 12% of the population is under 6 years of age.

Year	Male	Female	Total Population	Change	Religion (%)							
Year	Male	Female	Total Population	Change	Hindu	Muslim	Christian	Sikhs	Buddhist	Jain	Other religions and persuasions	Religion not stated
2001	4489	4248	8737	-	85.647	9.809	0.023	0.011	3.777	0.011	0.698	0.023
2011	4444	4333	8777	0.458	85.884	10.721	0.000	0.046	3.350	0.000	0.000	0.000

== Flooding ==
The Wardha River has flooded four times since 1950, in 1959, 1962, 1979 and 1991. The floods of 1962 and 1991 were the worst, causing heavy loss of life, property, crops and infrastructure. After the devastating flood of July 1991, all the houses in Mowad were shifted to safer sites. It is now a much more well planned town.
