= Chhindwara Junction railway station =

Indian rail station in Madhya Pradesh

Chhindwara Junction
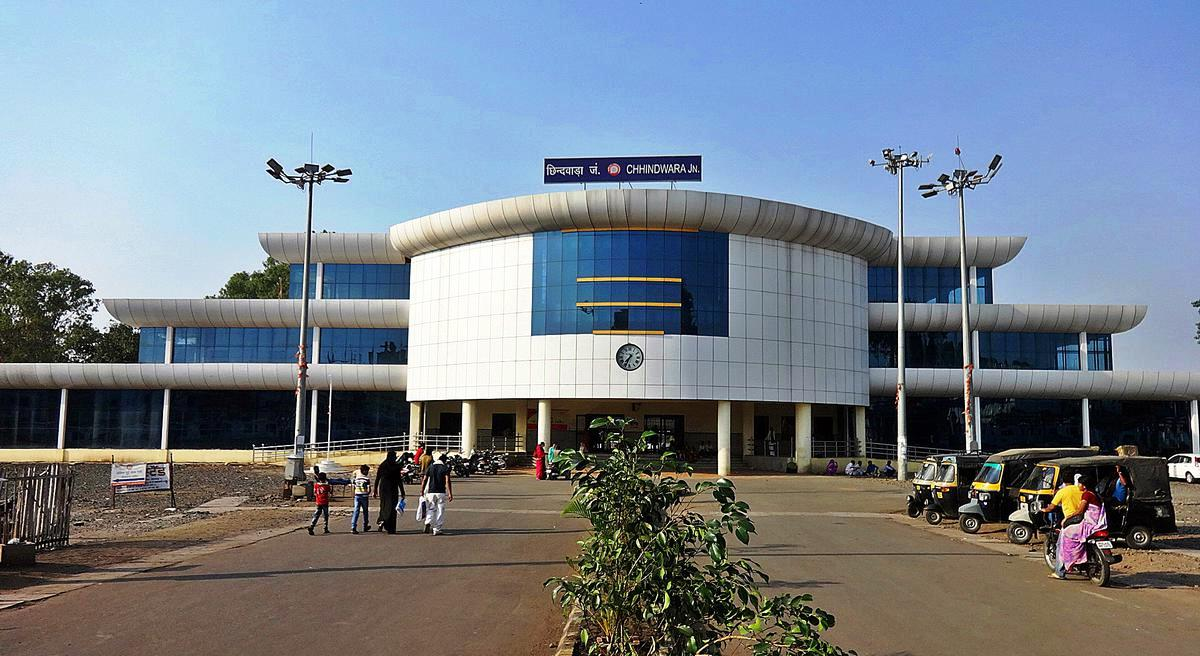

General information
- Location: Chhindwara, Chhindwara district, Madhya Pradesh; India
- Coordinates: 22°03′29″N 78°57′10″E
- Elevation: 673 metres (2,208 ft)
- System: Indian Railways junction station
- Owner: Indian Railways
- Lines: Nagpur–Chhindwara branch line, Chhindwara–Amla Link, Satpura Railway
- Platforms: 6
- Tracks: 6

Construction
- Structure type: At ground
- Parking: Available
- Cycle facilities: Available

Other information
- Status: Functional
- Station code: CWA
- Zone(s): South East Central Railway
- Division(s): Nagpur SEC

History
- Opened: 1904
- Rebuilt: 2026
- Former names: Bengal Nagpur Railway

Passengers
- Approx. 5 thousand daily
Location
- Location within Madhya Pradesh Location within India

Chhindwara Junction railway station (station code: CWA) is an Indian Railways junction station serving Chhindwara in Chhindwara district, Madhya Pradesh. It is administered by the Nagpur division of the South East Central Railway.

== History ==
Chhindwara formed part of the Satpura Railway, a network of 762 mm narrow-gauge lines developed by the Bengal Nagpur Railway. Nainpur was a focal point of the network, which connected Chhindwara with other parts of central India.

The railway between Nainpur and Chhindwara opened in 1904. It was later extended towards the Pench coalfield, with the route reaching Khirsadoh in 1906 and Barkuhi in 1907.

A separate narrow-gauge railway from Itwari in Nagpur reached Sausar in 1911 and was extended to Chhindwara in 1913. The Nagpur-Chhindwara Railway subsequently became part of the wider Satpura Railway network.

== Gauge conversion and electrification ==
The narrow-gauge routes serving Chhindwara were subsequently included in projects to convert the regional railway network to 1,676 mm broad gauge. The Nagpur-Chhindwara and Chhindwara-Nainpur-Mandla Fort projects experienced delays caused by funding and construction constraints.

Narrow-gauge services on the Nagpur-Chhindwara route ceased in 2015 to allow the line to be converted to broad gauge.

A Ministry of Railways publication reported that gauge conversion and electrification of the Chhindwara-Mandla Fort section had been completed. It also recorded the completion of gauge conversion and electrification between Bhandarkund and Bhimalgondi as part of the Chhindwara-Nagpur project.

The same publication recorded the installation of electronic interlocking at Chhindwara and several other stations on the converted routes. Additional platform shelters were also provided on platforms 3 and 4 at Chhindwara.

== Redevelopment ==
Chhindwara Junction was redeveloped under the Amrit Bharat Station Scheme. The project was undertaken by the Nagpur division of the South East Central Railway and was reported as completed in July 2026 at a cost of ₹17.23 crore.

The redeveloped station incorporates designs and artwork representing the region's cultural heritage and local landmarks, including Patalkot and Deogarh Fort. The work included a redesigned façade, two entrance gates, a large canopy, decorative panels, energy-efficient LED lighting, digital passenger-information displays and CCTV surveillance.

Passenger facilities provided through the redevelopment included air-conditioned waiting halls, modern toilets, improved drinking-water facilities, a food plaza and a baby-feeding room. The project also included a 12-metre-wide footbridge, six platform shelters, redesigned entrance and exit arrangements and additional parking.

== Services ==
Chhindwara Junction is served by express, passenger and Mainline Electric Multiple Unit services. Long-distance trains calling at the station include the Penchvalley Express, Patalkot Express, Rewa-NSC Bose Itwari Express and Nagpur-Shahdol Express.

Regional passenger and MEMU services connect Chhindwara with Amla, Nainpur, Mandla Fort, Seoni and NSC Bose Itwari. Some services originate or terminate at Chhindwara, while others call at the station on routes through the region.

Preceding station	Indian Railways	Following station
Terminus	South East Central Railway zone Chhindwara–Amla link	Gangiwara towards ?
Terminus	South East Central Railway zone Chhinwara–Nagpur branch line	Shikarpur Halt towards ?
Terminus	South East Central Railway zone Chhindwara–Nainpur–Mandla section of Satpura Railway	Umaria Ispa Halt towards ?
