= Barkuhi =

- Town
- Location in Madhya Pradesh, India Barkuhi (India)
- Coordinates: 22°12′17″N 78°41′33″E
- Country: India
- State: Madhya Pradesh
- District: Chhindwara

Population
  - Total: 12,689

Languages
  - Official: Hindi
- Time zone: UTC+5:30 (IST)
- ISO 3166 code: IN-MP
- Vehicle registration: MP
- Nearest city: Parasia
- Lok Sabha constituency: Chhindwara
- Vidhan Sabha constituency: Parasia

Barkuhi is a small town in Chhindwara District in the Indian state of Madhya Pradesh.

== Location ==
Situated on the banks of Pench River, it lies midway between Junnardeo and Parasia, about 35 km north-west of Chhindwara. The nearest railway stations are Eklehra (1.5 km) and Parasia (5 km). The nearest airport, Nagpur, is 125 km to south-east of Barkuhi. Barkuhi's population is 12,689.

This place is known in nearby areas because of a central school. This is the only central school in 35 km of radius. Its name is Kendriya vidyalaya barkuhi. Before being given the status of nagar panchayat in 2010, Barkuhi was the largest gram panchayat of Madhya Pradesh. There is a temple located on a hill known as Barah Mandir. All twelve shivlinga located across India are present here.

== Transport ==
The nearest airport is Jabalpur.
