= Tamia, Madhya Pradesh =

Town in Madhya Pradesh, India

Coordinates: 22°20′37″N 78°40′12″E

Tamia
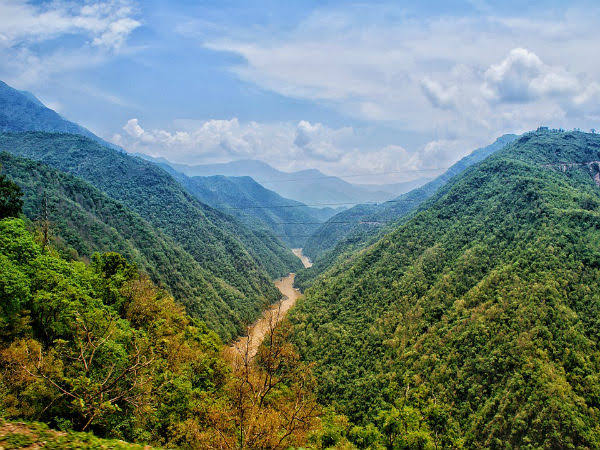
- Tamia Hills
- Interactive map of Tamia
- Country: India
- State: Madhya Pradesh
- District: Chhindwara

Government
  - Type: Gram Panchayat

Population (2011)
  - Total: 5,481
- Vehicle registration: MP 28

Tamia is a small town located in Chhindwara District of Madhya Pradesh which is also a tehsil headquarter and a Development Block.

== Geography ==
Tamia is located in the Satpura Range.Dudhi River originates from here. It is 55 km away from Chhindwara. 480559 is its pin code.

== Demographics ==
Tamia town population of 5481 of which 2838 are males while 2643 are females as Census 2011.Total 1254 families residing here.

== Places to Visit ==
- Patalkot
- Tamia Hills
- Tamia Resort

== Transport ==
Tamia is well connected with roads. Road's connecting it from Parasia, Pachmadhi and Chhindwara. Daily Bus service available from here.
