= Amarwara =

City in Madhya Pradesh, India

Amarwara Amberwarra
- Municipality
- Location in Madhya Pradesh, India Amarwara (India)
- Coordinates: 22.3°N 79.17°E
- Country: India
- State: Madhya Pradesh
- District: Chhindwara

Government
  - Body: Nagar Palika Parishad
- Elevation: 1,436 m (4,711 ft)

Population (2011)
  - Total: 14,141

Languages
  - Official: Hindi
- Time zone: UTC+5:30 (IST)
- Postal code: 480221
- ISO 3166 code: IN-MP
- Vehicle registration: MP-28

Amarwara is a tehsil and a Nagar Palika Parishad in Chhindwara district in the state of Madhya Pradesh, India.

== Geography and climate ==
=== Geography ===
Amarwara is located at 22.3°N 79.17°E. It has an average elevation of 796 metres (2,611 feet). Amarwara is located in between the Mountains of Satpura confined between Dulha Dev Ghati and Bhumka Ghati.

=== Climate ===
The climate is warm and temperate in Amarwara. In winter, there is much more rainfall in Amarwara than in summer. According to Köppen and Geiger, this climate is classified as Csa. The average annual temperature is 23.5 °C in Amarwara. About 1088 mm of precipitation falls annually.

Climate data for Amarwara
Month	Jan	Feb	Mar	Apr	May	Jun	Jul	Aug	Sep	Oct	Nov	Dec	Year
Mean daily maximum °C (°F)	24.4 (75.9)	27.6 (81.7)	31.9 (89.4)	35.7 (96.3)	38.7 (101.7)	34.2 (93.6)	27.4 (81.3)	26.8 (80.2)	28 (82)	28.4 (83.1)	26.5 (79.7)	25.1 (77.2)	29.6 (85.2)
Daily mean °C (°F)	17.2 (63.0)	19.8 (67.6)	24 (75)	28.3 (82.9)	31.9 (89.4)	29 (84)	24.5 (76.1)	24 (75)	24.3 (75.7)	22.6 (72.7)	18.9 (66.0)	17.2 (63.0)	23.5 (74.2)
Mean daily minimum °C (°F)	10 (50)	12 (54)	16.2 (61.2)	21 (70)	25.1 (77.2)	23.9 (75.0)	21.6 (70.9)	21.2 (70.2)	20.6 (69.1)	16.9 (62.4)	11.4 (52.5)	9.3 (48.7)	17.4 (63.4)
Average precipitation mm (inches)	15 (0.6)	14 (0.6)	24 (0.9)	13 (0.5)	11 (0.4)	137 (5.4)	309 (12.2)	285 (11.2)	207 (8.1)	48 (1.9)	12 (0.5)	13 (0.5)	1,088 (42.8)

== Demographics ==
As of the 2011 Census of India, Amarwara had a population of 14,141. Males constitute 50.3% of the population and females 49.7%. Amarwara has an average literacy rate of 85.58%, higher than the state average of 69.32% and national average of 74.04%; with 90.6% of the males and 80.49% of females literate. 11.43% of the population is under 6 years of age.

== Transportation ==
National Highway 547 connects the town with Chhindwara, Harrai and Narsinghpur.

== See also ==
- Amarwara (Vidhan Sabha constituency)
