= State Highway 19 (Madhya Pradesh) =

State highway in Madhya Pradesh, India

State Highway 19

Route information

Major junctions
- North end: Porsa, UP border
- Mehgaon, Datia, Narwar, Sultanpur, Bareli, Piparia, Matkuli, Tamia, Parasia
- South end: Chhindwara

Location
- Country: India
- State: Madhya Pradesh

Highway system
- Roads in India; Expressways; National; State; Asian; State Highways in Madhya Pradesh

Madhya Pradesh State Highway 19 (MP SH 19) is a 651.7 kilometres (404.9 mi) long State Highway running from Porsa town near MP-UP border via Mehgaon, Datia, Narwar, Sultanpur, Bareli, Piparia, Matkuli, Tamia, Parasia and terminates at Chhindwara city. It is an important highway which connects important towns of Northern Madhya Pradesh and Southern Madhya Pradesh.

A branch of this highway named MP SH 19A goes to Pachmarhi from Matkuli, which is 29 kilometres (18 mi) long.

== See also ==
- List of state highways in Madhya Pradesh
