= Umranala =

Town in Madhya Pradesh, India

- City
- Umranala
- Location in Madhya Pradesh, India Umranala (India)
- Coordinates: 21.87°N 78.87°E
- Country: India
- State: Madhya Pradesh
- District: Chhindwara district
- Tehsil: Mohkhed
- Elevation: 474 m (1,555 ft)

Population (2026)
  - Total: 10,456

Languages
  - Official: Hindi
- Time zone: UTC+5:30 (IST)
- PIN: 480107
- ISO 3166 code: IN-MP
- Vehicle registration: MP-28
- Avg. high temperature: 32.7 °C (90.9 °F)
- Avg. low temperature: 18.0 °C (64.4 °F)

Umranala (Hindi: उमरानाला) is a city in Mohkhed tehsil of Chhindwara district of Madhya Pradesh. It serves as the urban settlement along National Highway 547 (NH547), with access to basic amenities including education institutions up to senior secondary level, primary health facilities, and transportation links via highway roads and bus services. The city has its own railway station. It has connectivity with both Nagpur and Chhindwara.

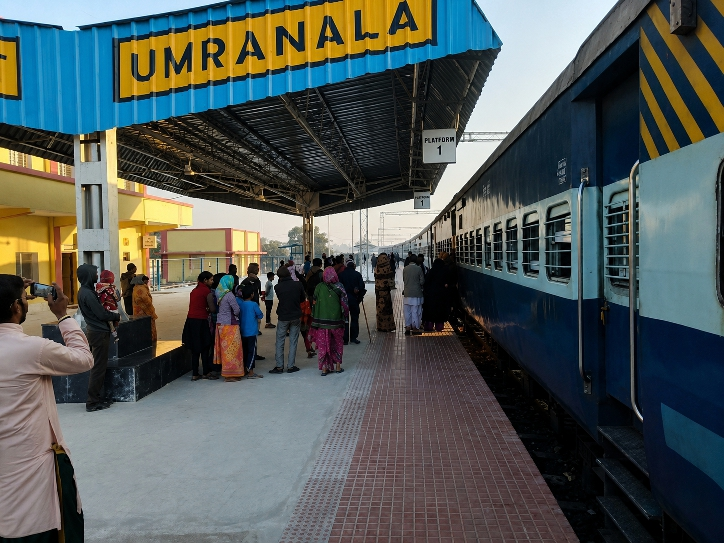
Umranala Railway Station

== Geography ==
Umranala is located on the NH547 road between Nagpur and Chhindwara. It stands in the Satpura Range encompassing hilly and undulating terrain with elevations ranging from 470 to 1,160 m above sea level and an average of 675 meters. Umranala is positioned near the Umra River, a tributary in the Godavari River Basin, which flows in close proximity to the city and supports local water resources through structures like the Umranala Dam. The surrounding landscape features typical Satpura formations of forested hills and plateaus, contributing to the area's rugged geography.

== Climate ==
Climate data for Umranala
Month	Jan	Feb	Mar	Apr	May	Jun	Jul	Aug	Sep	Oct	Nov	Dec	Year
Mean daily maximum °C (°F)	20.4 (68.7)	25.6 (78.1)	30.9 (87.6)	34.5 (94.1)	36.7 (98.1)	34.8 (94.6)	27.3 (81.1)	25.8 (78.4)	27.6 (81.7)	26.4 (79.5)	24.5 (76.1)	21.2 (70.2)	28.0 (82.4)
Daily mean °C (°F)	18.9 (66.0)	22.4 (72.3)	26.9 (80.4)	31.3 (88.3)	33.6 (92.5)	30.0 (86.0)	25.2 (77.4)	24.1 (75.4)	24.5 (76.1)	23.7 (74.7)	21.4 (70.5)	19.1 (66.4)	25.1 (77.2)
Mean daily minimum °C (°F)	15.5 (59.9)	20.5 (68.9)	22.2 (72.0)	27.2 (81.0)	28.9 (84.0)	27.8 (82.0)	21.8 (71.2)	22.2 (72.0)	21.6 (70.9)	20.9 (69.6)	18.4 (65.1)	12.3 (54.1)	21.6 (70.9)
Average precipitation mm (inches)	15 (0.6)	14 (0.6)	24 (0.9)	13 (0.5)	11 (0.4)	137 (5.4)	309 (12.2)	285 (11.2)	207 (8.1)	48 (1.9)	12 (0.5)	13 (0.5)	1,088 (42.8)

== Population ==
As of 2026, Umranala had a population of 10,456, of which 5,208 were males and 5,248 were females. A total of 2,877 families resided in the city. In 2026 the literacy rate was 90.67%.

== Education ==
=== Education ===
Umranala is an important educational centre for the surrounding villages of Chhindwara district. The city has several government and private schools providing education at the primary, secondary and higher-secondary levels. Umranala also has Government College, which offers undergraduate education in various disciplines. The availability of schools and higher-education facilities makes Umranala an important centre for students from nearby rural areas.

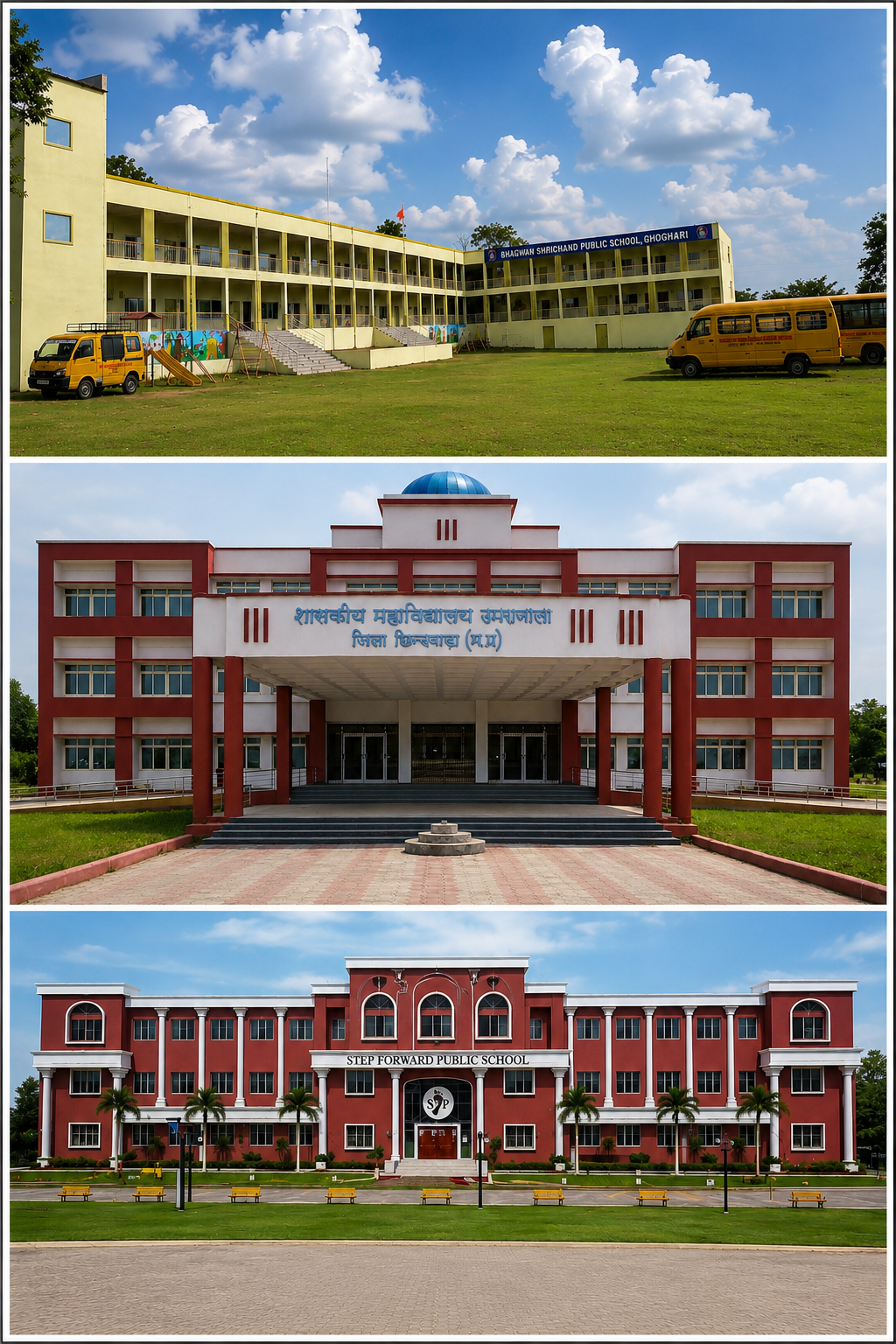
Educational institutions of Umranala 01

=== Schools ===
Umranala has more than 20 schools; there are two government schools in the city, affiliated to the Central Board of Secondary Education (CBSE). The city is also served by numerous other private schools affiliated to either CBSE or MPBSE.

- New Sunflower English & Hindi School
- Sanskar Srajan Higher Secondary school
- Saraswati Shishu Mandir
- Om Sai Vidya Bhumi School
- Sun Shine Education School
- Step Forward Public School
- Bhagwan Shrichand Public School
- Shaskiya Madhyamik School
- Shaskiya High School
- Shaskiya Higher Secondary School
- Vivekanand Gyan Mandir School

=== Higher education ===
Umranala has one college for higher education as well as a higher secondary school.

== Transportation ==
Transportation infrastructure includes the Umra Nala railway station (code - ULA), a regular halt on the double electric-line track line in the South-East Central Railway's Nagpur division, where eight trains stop daily and connect to nearby stations like Bhandarkund (10 km away). The city benefits from electricity for domestic, agriculture, and commercial use, along with communication facilities such as post offices, police stations, mobile coverage, and internet cafes. Umranala is connected to its neighbouring villages by rail and road. The nearest airport is Nagpur Airport (104 km). A small airport is located in Chhindwara which is not serviceable for big passenger planes and can only serve small private aircraft. Umranala is connected to nearby big city like Nagpur via bus or train.

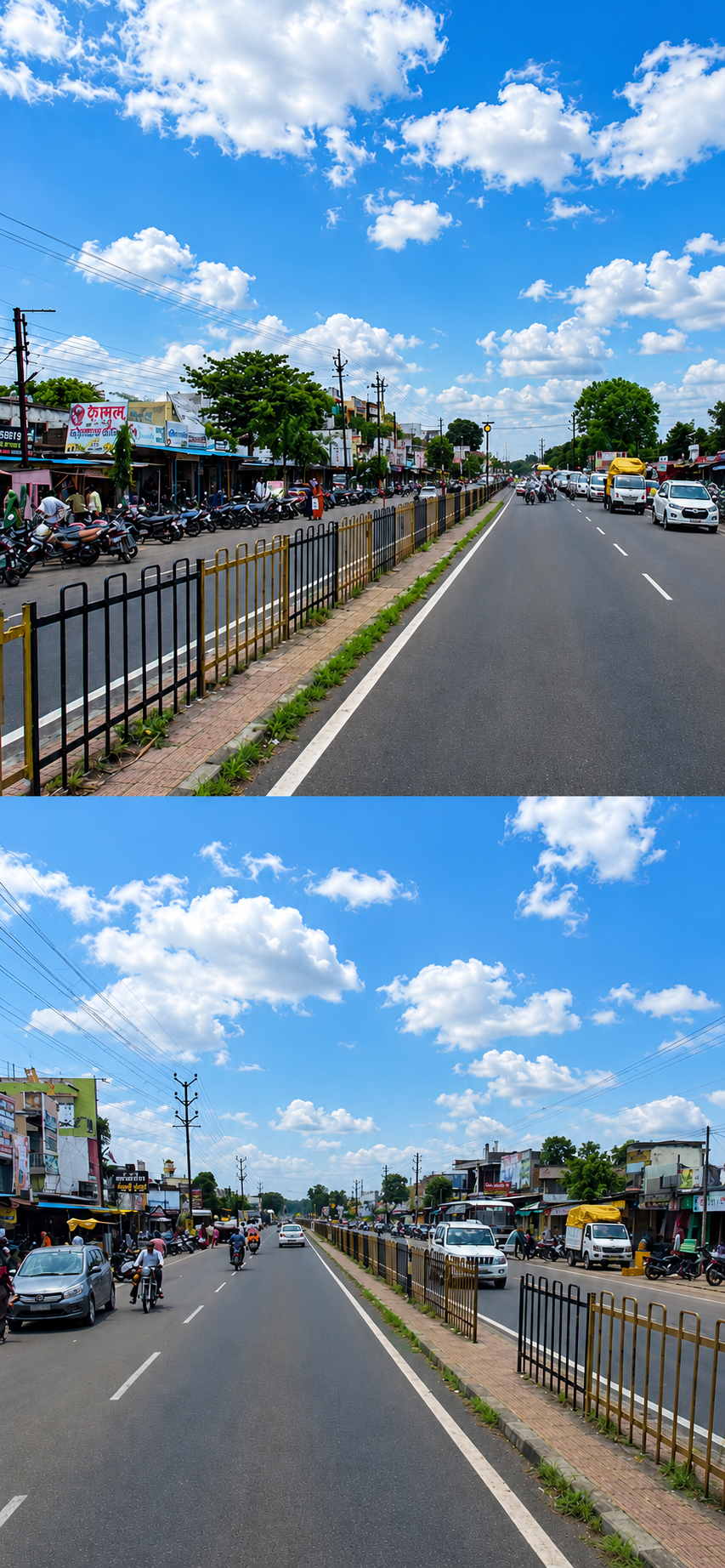
Umranala Bus Stand

Buses are frequently available for many places like Bichhua, Mohkhed, Chhindwara, Pandhurna, Sausar, Nagpur and Seoni also. Daily about 300 buses stop daily at Umranala Bus stand. Buses available every 5 Minutes halt .

== Road Infrastructure ==
Umranala is settled in a specific place that gives advantage to city for many connecting road .

Mohkhed road goes through Umranala that makes umranala a city to travel easily to Mohkhed and other villages that settled on that road.

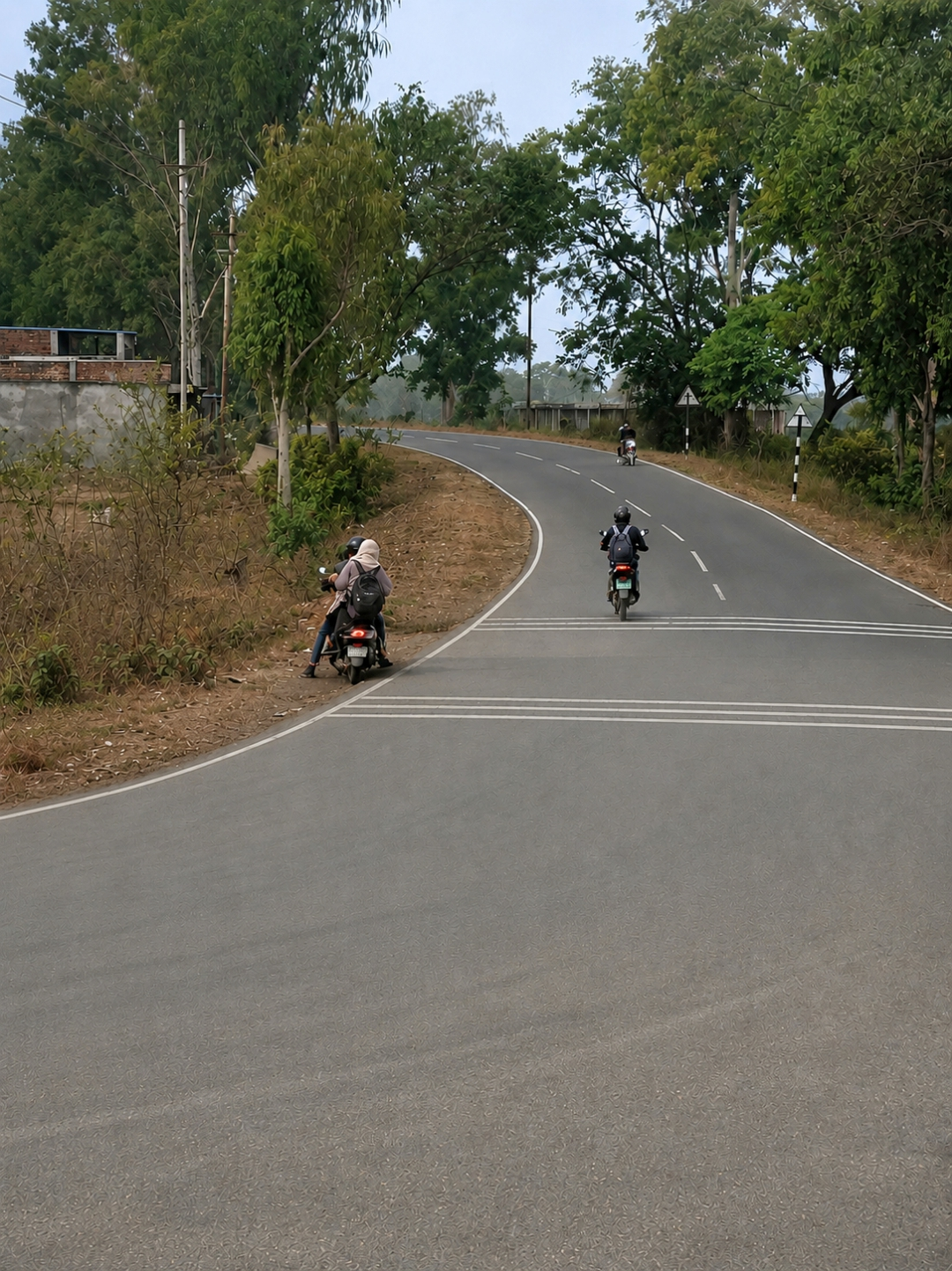
Umranala - Mohkhed Road

Bichhua road also goes through outskirts of Umranala and Umranala - Bichhua road is very busy for travel. This road is main road to travel to Bichhua.

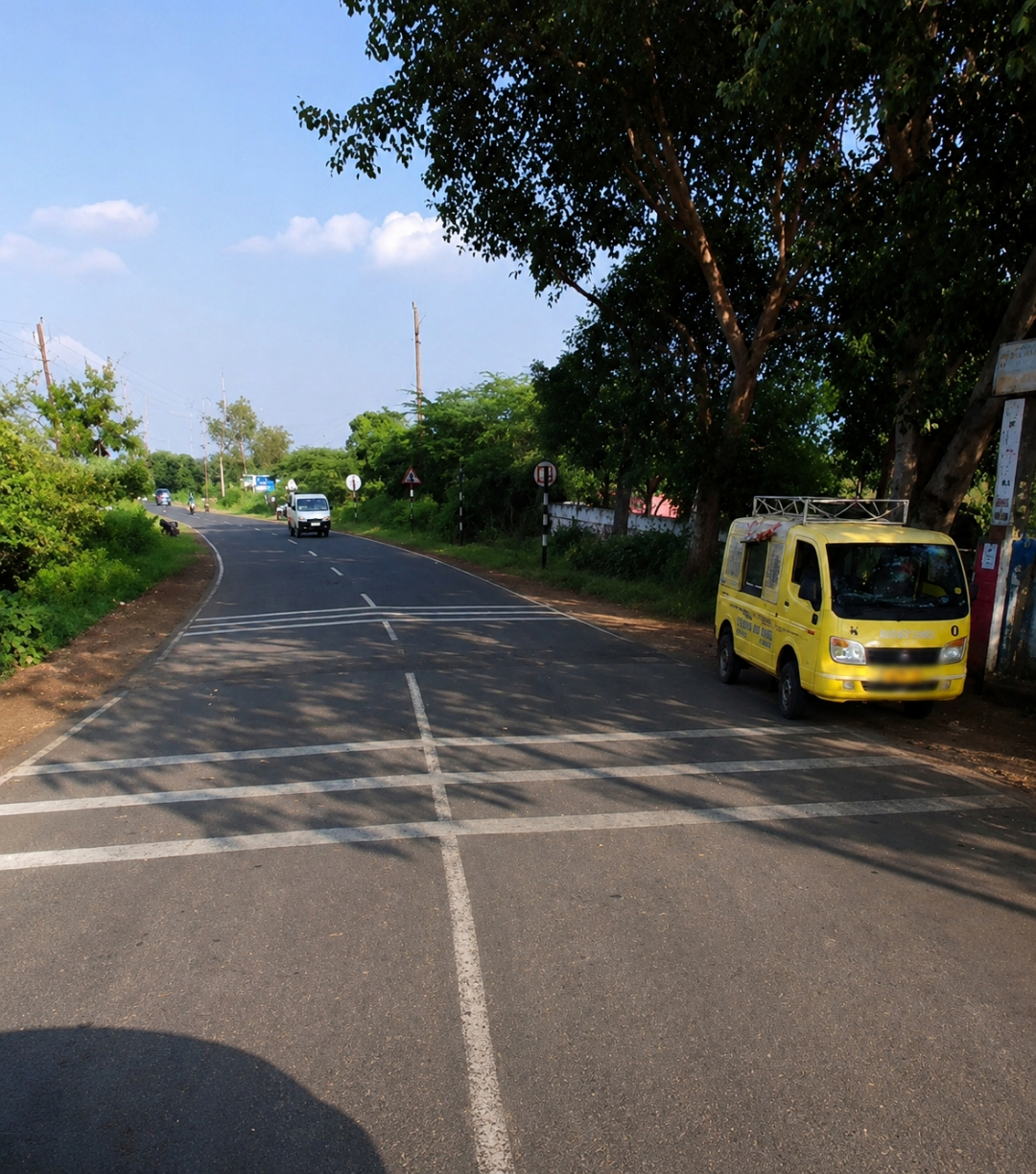
Umranala - Bichhua Road

Umranala is settled on Chhindwara - Nagpur Highway ( NH-547) that gives Umranala direct connectivity to Chhindwara and Nagpur.

Umranala also has inner- small villages road networks and also city roads for easy travel.

== Healthcare ==
There are many Private Clinics as well as many Medical Shops for healthcare. Umranala serves Medical facilities to many neighbouring small villages at the range of 15 k.m.

Umranala also has one private and one government hospital for Emergency Services.

== Religious places ==
The 101 feet statue of Lord Hanuman (known as Siddheshwar Hanuman Mandir) is 4 km away from the city in the village of Simariya.

== Tourist places ==
There are many tourist places near the city: Deogarh Fort is 22 km away by road, Kukdi Khapa Waterfall is on the road to Ramakona.
