= Chaurai Khas =

Chourai Chaurai Khas
- Town
- Location in Madhya Pradesh, India Chourai (India)
- Coordinates: 22°3′32″N 79°14′51″E
- Country: India
- State: Madhya Pradesh
- District: Chhindwara

Population (2001)
  - Total: 11,399

Languages
  - Official: Hindi
- Time zone: UTC+5:30 (IST)
- Postal code: 480115
- ISO 3166 code: IN-MP
- Vehicle registration: MP

Chourai is a town and a nagar panchayat in Chhindwara district in the state of Madhya Pradesh, India.

== Geography ==
Chaurai is situated on 22°3′32″N 79°14′51″E. The National Highway 347 runs through the town. Chaurai is located on 35 km away from chhindwara and 180 km away from Jabalpur

== Demographics ==
As of 2001 India census, Chaurai Khas had a population of 11,399. Males constitute 52% of the population and females 48%. Chaurai Khas has an average literacy rate of 69%, higher than the national average of 59.5%; with male literacy of 74% and female literacy of 63%. 13% of the population is under 6 years of age.

== Government ==
Chourai Assembly constituency is one of the 230 Vidhan Sabha (Legislative Assembly) constituencies of Madhya Pradesh state in central India.

== Administration ==
Chaurai Khas Municipality has total administration over 2,742 houses to which it supplies basic amenities like water and sewerage. It is also authorize to build roads within Municipality limits and impose taxes on properties coming under its jurisdiction.

Chaurai Khas Work Profile

Out of total population, 4,348 were engaged in work or business activity. Of this 3,377 were males while 971 were females. In census survey, worker is defined as person who does business, job, service, and cultivator and labour activity. Of total 4348 working population, 84.13 % were engaged in Main Work while 15.87 % of total workers were engaged in Marginal Work.

== Attractions ==
- Machagora Dam, is 15.2 KM from Chourai.
- Shasthi Mata Mandir, Kapurda is 10.4 KM from Chourai.

== Transportation ==
Chaurai is connected by private bus services to all nearest major cities.

Chaurai railway Station Connected it from major citys of Madhya Pradesh by railway.
