= Kali Bari Chhindwara =

- काली बाड़ी छिन्दवाड़ा
- Location in Madhya Pradesh

Religion
- Affiliation: Hinduism
- District: Chhindwara District
- Deity: Kali
- Festivals: Kali Puja, Diwali, Holi

Location
- Location: Chhindwara
- State: Madhya Pradesh
- Country: India
- Coordinates: 22.07°N 78.93°E

Architecture
- Type: Bengal architecture
- Completed: 1995

Specifications
- Temples: 1:मुख्य मंदिर (Main Temple) & 2:शिव मंदिर (Shiv Temple)
- Elevation: 675 m (2,215 ft)

Kali Bari Chhindwara (Bengali: কালীবাড়ি ছিন্দওয়ারা Hindi: काली बाड़ी छिंदवाड़ा) is a temple dedicated to Goddess Kali and the center of Bengali culture in Chhindwara, Madhya Pradesh, India. The temple was built in 1995 from marble in Bengal architectural style. Devotees from all religions and castes worship at the temple.

== History ==
After several years of requests by the people from all religions of Chhindwara District, members of the Bengali Durga Puja Committee Chhindwara, the oldest Bengali cultural organization of the district, decided to construct a Kali temple at Chhindwara, India. A planning and fundraising committee named Kali Bari Nirman Samiti was formed. The committee also selected the temple's site and oversaw its design and construction.

Kali Bari Chhindwara was built in 1995 from marble in the Bengal architectural style. The temple resembles the famous Dakshineswar Kali Temple near Kolkata. It was dedicated to the Goddess Kali and serves as a center of Bengali culture.

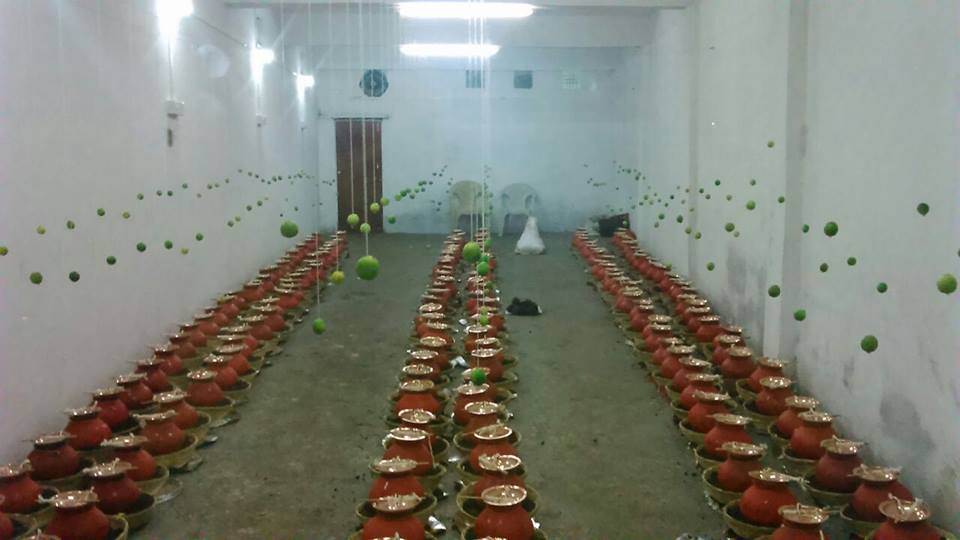
Jyoti Kalash Sthapana at Kali Bari Chhindwara

On various occasions like Kali Puja (Diwali), Durga Puja, Sankranti, and Navaratri, thousands of devotees gather at the temple for worship. Various festivals like Bengali New Year, Ravindra Jayanti, Shri Ram Krishna Jayanti, Vivekananda Jayanti, and Independence Day are celebrated at the temple.

== Location ==
The temple lies in the southern ranges of the Satpura Range at 22.07°N 78.93°E in the dense forested city of Chhindwara in the state of Madhya Pradesh. Kali Bari is situated on a plateau, surrounded by lush green fields, rivers, and sagaun trees. It has an average altitude of 675 metres (2,215 ft) above mean sea level.

The temple is in the heart of Chhindwara city. Chhindwara is reachable by rail or road from Nagpur and Bhopal. Chhindwara railway station is 3 km from the temple. The nearest airports are Chhindwara (5 km) and Nagpur (109 km).

== See also ==
- Kalighat Kali Temple
- Dakshineswar Kali Temple
