= Deogarh, Madhya Pradesh =

Deogarh
- Village
- Location in Madhya Pradesh, India Deogarh (India)
- Coordinates: 21°52′57.36″N 78°43′58.69″E
- Country: India
- State: Madhya Pradesh
- District: Chhindwara

Population (2011)
  - Total: 774

Languages
  - Official: Hindi • Gondi
- Time zone: UTC+5:30 (IST)
- ISO 3166 code: IN-MP
- Vehicle registration: MP-28

Deogarh, also known as Devgarh, is a village in Mohkhed tehsil of Chhindwara District of the Indian state of Madhya Pradesh. It is located 24 miles southwest of Chhindwara, picturesquely situated on a crest of the hills. It was the centre of the Gond kingdom of Deogarh.

== Attractions ==
- Deogarh Fort

== Sources ==
- Hunter, William Wilson, Sir, et al. (1908). Imperial Gazetteer of India, Volume 10. 1908–1931; Clarendon Press, Oxford.
