= Badkuhi =

- Census town
- Location in Madhya Pradesh, India Badkuhi (India)
- Coordinates: 22°13′21″N 78°41′12″E
- Country: India
- State: Madhya Pradesh
- District: Chhindwara

Population (2001)
  - Total: 10,764

Languages
  - Official: Hindi
- Time zone: UTC+5:30 (IST)

Badkuhi is a census town in Chhindwara district in the state of Madhya Pradesh, India.

== Demographics ==
As of 2001 India census, Badkuhi had a population of 10,764. Males constitute 52% of the population and females 48%. Badkuhi has an average literacy rate of 72%, higher than the national average of 59.5%; with 58% of the males and 42% of females literate. 11% of the population is under 6 years of age.
