= Sirgora =

- Census town
- Location in Madhya Pradesh, India Sirgora (India)
- Coordinates: 22°12′18″N 78°53′0″E
- Country: India
- State: Madhya Pradesh
- District: Chhindwara

Population (2001)
  - Total: 8,485

Languages
  - Official: Hindi
- Time zone: UTC+5:30 (IST)
- ISO 3166 code: IN-MP
- Vehicle registration: MP

Sirgora is a census town in Chhindwara district in the Indian state of Madhya Pradesh.

== Demographics ==
As of 2001 India census, Sirgora had a population of 8,485. Males constitute 52% of the population and females 48%. Sirgora has an average literacy rate of 63%, higher than the national average of 59.5%: male literacy is 72%, and female literacy is 54%. In Sirgora, 14% of the population is under 6 years of age.
