= Dudhi River =

River in Madhya Pradesh

Dudhi River Dudhi River
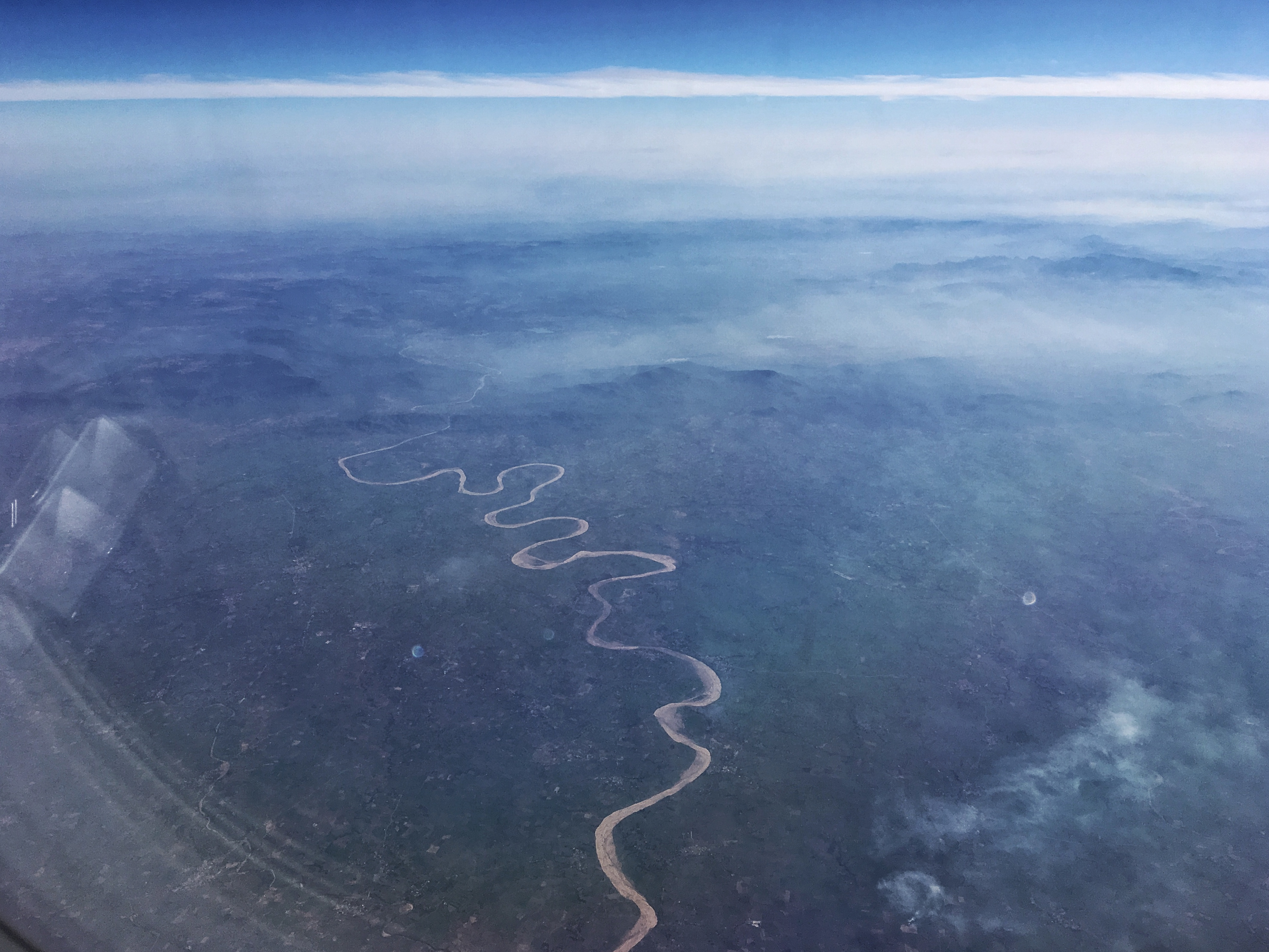
- Dudhi river, from the Satpura National Park, flowing north to the Narmada.

- Indian River Map

Location
- Country: India
- State: madhya Pradesh
- City: Sainkheda, Tamiya

Physical characteristics
- Source: Satpura range
  - location: Patalkot Chhindwara district
- Mouth: Narmada River
  - location: Pansi Ghat Narsinghpur District
  - coordinates: 22°59′N 78°26′E
- Length: 129 km (80 mi)
- Basin size: 1,541 sq. km.

Doodhi River is a river in Madhya Pradesh, India. It is tributary of Narmada River. Mainly Doodhi River flowing in Chhindwara and Narsinghpur District.

== See also ==
- Narmada River
- List of rivers of Madhya Pradesh
