= Delakhari =

Delakahri is a village of Chhindwara district in the Indian state of Madhya Pradesh. This village is situated within a high forest, on the road connecting Chhindwara town and the hill station Pachmarhi.
