= Pench River =

River in India

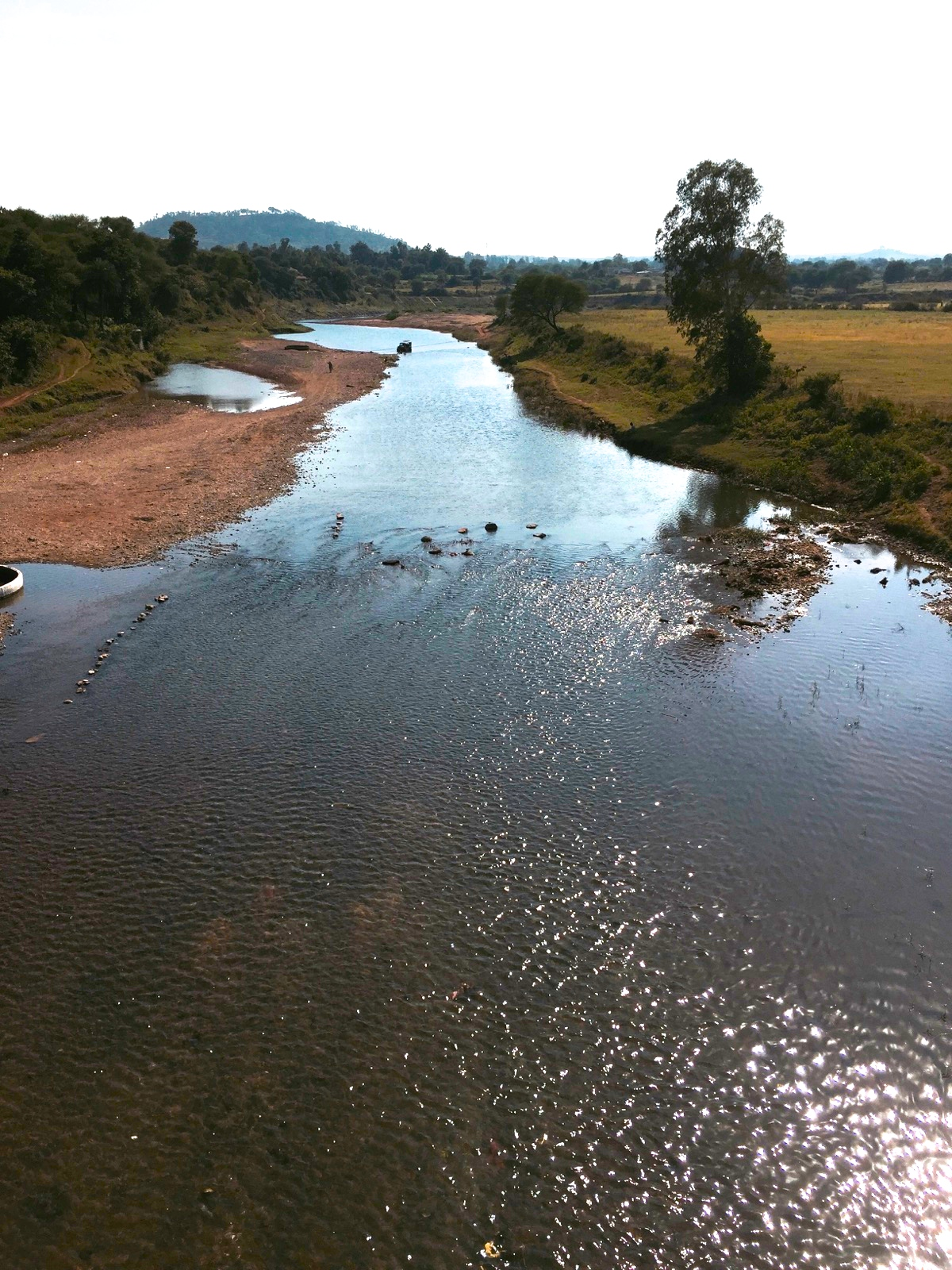
- Pench river before Chhindwara

Location
- Country: India
- Cities: Junnardeo, Parasia, Chhindwara, Chourai, Kamthi

Physical characteristics
- Source: Satpura range
  - location: Junnardeo, Chhindwara District, Madhya Pradesh
  - coordinates: 22°18′N 78°35′E
  - elevation: 1,048 m (3,438 ft)
- Mouth: Kanhan River
  - location: Kamthi, Nagpur District, Nagpur
  - coordinates: 21°16′N 79°10′E
  - elevation: 310 m (1,020 ft)

Basin features
- Tributaries
  - right: Kulbehra River

The Pench River is an Indian tributary of the Kanhan River. It originates in the Chhindwara district of Madhya Pradesh and flows across Pench National Park, which is a reserve for the Tiger Project of India.

The two big dams of the Pench River supply water to the city of Nagpur and to the big thermal power plant located there. Machagora Pench dam supplies water to Seoni district and Chhindwara district for agriculture through irrigation canels.

== Pench National Park ==
The river separates Pench National Park into two halves, east and west Pench. The Pench Tiger Reserve derives its name after the Pench River, which flows from north to south across the reserve. The reserve is situated on the south of the Satpura Hill Ranges in the Seoni District and Chhindwara District in the Madhya Pradesh state of India. The topography is undulating, with most of the area enclosed by small hill ranges and abrupt slopes on all the sides. The Pench river flowing through the centre of the Reserve is usually dry by April, but a number of water pools, locally known as dohs, are found along the course of the river. These serve as waterholes for wild animals. A few perennial springs also exist in the region. Recently, a number of earthen ponds and shallow wells have been created, providing well-distributed sources of water across the reserve.

== Dam ==
The hydroelectric Totladoh Dam on the Pench River was the first interstate project of Maharashtra. It is located in the Pench National Park. The next big dam is Kamthikhairy Dam near just downstream of the Totladoh Dam the town of Navegaon Khairy located in Parseoni Taluka. More than 70% of the drinking water in Nagpur is supplied from the dams.

The Pench right canal is made up of combination of concrete lining and Bituminous geomembrane lining in select areas to limit seepage. It supplies water to Nagpur, the Koradi Thermal Power Station, and the Khaparkheda Thermal Power Station, and the rest of the water is use for irrigation in Parseoni taluka, Kalmeshwar taluka, Saoner taluka, Kamthi taluka, and rural Nagpur. The Pench left canal irrigates Parseoni taluka, Ramtek taluka, and Mauda taluka and provides water for the NTPC Mauda Super Thermal Power Station and other industrial purposes.
