= Dighawani =

- Census town
- Location in Madhya Pradesh, India Dighawani (India)
- Coordinates: 22°12′17″N 78°49′2″E
- Country: India
- State: Madhya Pradesh
- District: Chhindwara

Population (2001)
  - Total: 7,935

Languages
  - Official: Hindi
- Time zone: UTC+5:30 (IST)
- ISO 3166 code: IN-MP
- Vehicle registration: MP

Dighawani is a census town in Chhindwara district in the state of Madhya Pradesh, India.

== Demographics ==
As of 2001 India census, Dighawani had a population of 7935. Males constitute 53% of the population and females 47%. Dighawani has an average literacy rate of 61%, higher than the national average of 59.5%: male literacy is 70% and, female literacy is 51%. In Dighawani, 13% of the population is under 6 years of age.
