= Bhamodi =

- Census town
- Location in Madhya Pradesh, India Bhamodi (India)
- Coordinates: 22°11′21″N 78°44′16″E
- Country: India
- State: Madhya Pradesh
- District: Chhindwara

Population (2001)
  - Total: 3,983

Languages
  - Official: Hindi
- Time zone: UTC+5:30 (IST)
- ISO 3166 code: IN-MP
- Vehicle registration: MP

Bhamodi is a census town in Chhindwara district in the state of Madhya Pradesh, India.

== Demographics ==
As of 2001 India census, Bhamodi had a population of 3,983. Males constitute 52% of the population and females 48%. Bhamodi has an average literacy rate of 74%, higher than the national average of 59.5%; with 58% of the males and 42% of the females literate. 9% of the population is under 6 years of age.
