= Ambada =

- Census Town
- Location in Madhya Pradesh, India Ambada (India)
- Coordinates: 22°11′21″N 78°41′25″E
- Country: India
- State: Madhya Pradesh
- District: Chhindwara

Population (2001)
  - Total: 6,895

Languages
  - Official: Hindi
- Time zone: UTC+5:30 (IST)
- ISO 3166 code: IN-MP
- Vehicle registration: MP

Ambada is a census town in Chhindwara district in the state of Madhya Pradesh, India.

== Demographics ==
As of 2001 India census, Ambada had a population of 6,895. Males constitute 54% of the population and females 46%. Ambada has an average literacy rate of 70%, higher than the national average of 59.5%; with 60% of the males and 40% of females literate. 8% of the population is under 6 years of age.
