= Neuton Chikhli Kalan =

Newton Chikhli Kalan
- Town
- Location in Madhya Pradesh, India Newton Chikhli Kalan (India)
- Coordinates: 21°58′1″N 78°56′6″E
- Country: India
- State: Madhya Pradesh
- District: Chhindwara

Population (2001)
  - Total: 10,850

Languages
  - Official: Hindi
- Time zone: UTC+5:30 (IST)
- ISO 3166 code: IN-MP
- Vehicle registration: MP

Newton Chikhli Kalan is a Town and a Nagar Panchayat in Chhindwara district in the Indian state of Madhya Pradesh, India.

== Demographics ==
As of 2001 India census, Neuton Chikhli Kalan had a population of 10,850. Males constitute 52% of the population and females 48%. Neuton Chikhli Kalan has an average literacy rate of 68%, higher than the national average of 59.5%: male literacy is 76%, and female literacy is 59%. In Neuton Chikhli Kalan, 12% of the population is under 6 years of age.
