= Pal Chourai =

Pal Chourai Pala Chourai
- Town
- Location in Madhya Pradesh, India Pal Chourai (India)
- Coordinates: 22°11′44″N 78°35′48″E
- Country: India
- State: Madhya Pradesh
- District: Chhindwara

Population (2001)
  - Total: 7,264

Languages
  - Official: Hindi
- Time zone: UTC+5:30 (IST)
- ISO 3166 code: IN-MP
- Vehicle registration: MP

Pala Chourai is a census town in Chhindwara district in the Indian state of Madhya Pradesh.

== Demographics ==
As of the 2001 India census, Pala Chourai had a population of 7264. Males constitute 52% of the population and females 48%. Pala Chourai has an average literacy rate of 72%, higher than the national average of 59.5%: male literacy is 80%, and female literacy is 63%. In Pala Chourai, 10% of the population is under 6 years of age.
