= Khirsadoh Junction railway station =

Railway station in Madhya Pradesh, India

Khirsadoh Junction is a small railway junction near Chhindwara city in Madhya Pradesh, India.
