= Kulbehra River =

Kuldhara River
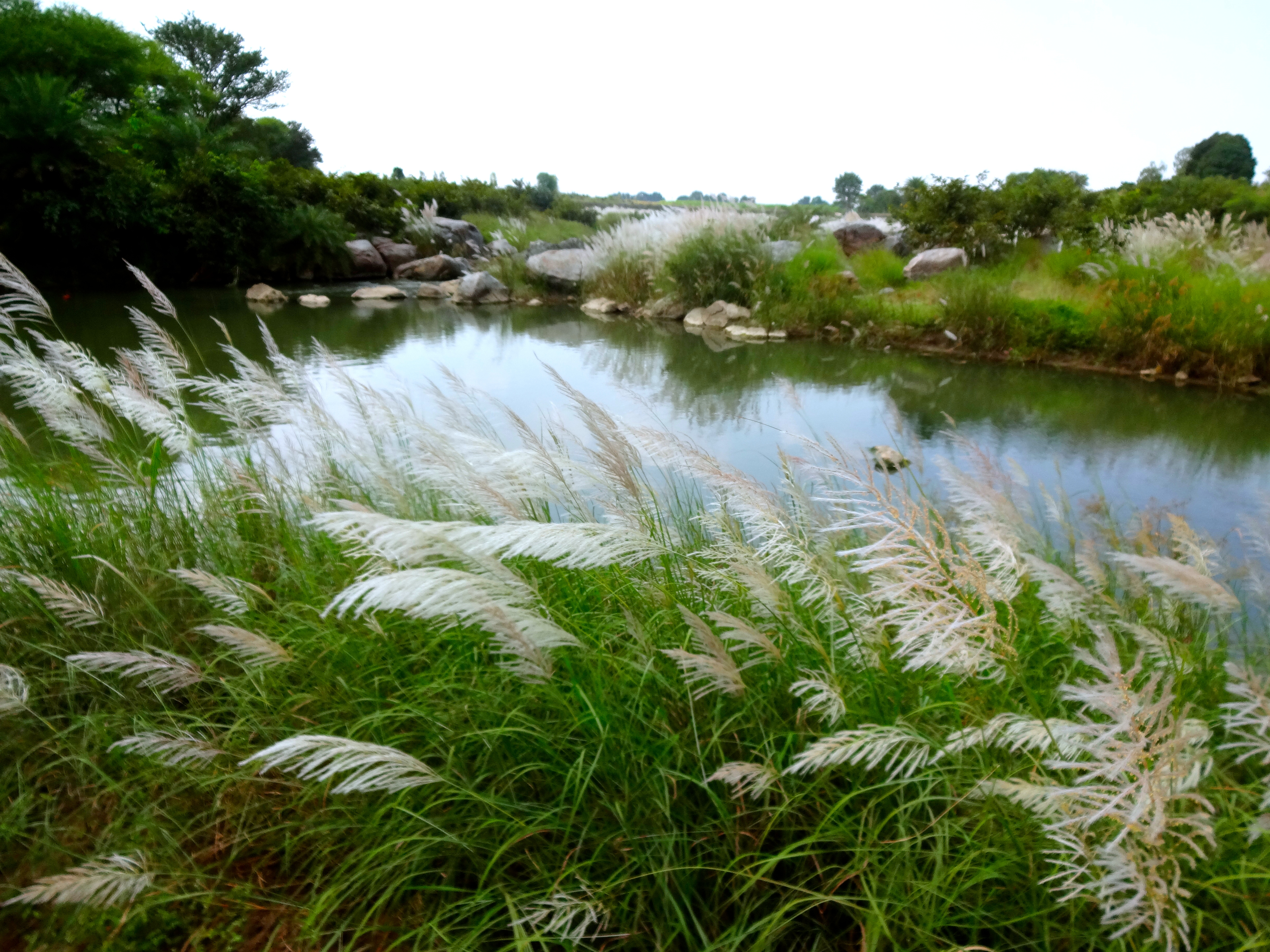
- Kuldhara river on the outskirts of Chhindwara

Location
- Country: India
- State: Madhya Pradesh
- District: Chhindwara District, Madhya Pradesh

Physical characteristics
- Source: Satpura Range
  - location: Chhindwara District, Madhya Pradesh
  - coordinates: 22°07′30″N 78°43′17″E
- Mouth: Pench River
  - location: Chhindwara district, Madhya Pradesh
  - coordinates: 21°55′25″N 79°10′30″E
- Length: 80 km (50 mi)

Basin features
- Tributaries
  - left: Bodri river
  - right: Umra River, Chotti Kulbehra

The Kuldhara River is a river in Chhindwara District of Madhya Pradesh state, India. It is a tributary of the Pench and has a course of about fifty miles.

== Origin ==
The Kuldhara River starts in Umreth Tehsil at the junction of three small streams near the town of Umreth. Moghkhed Tehsil passing just south of the town of Chikhalikala & Hetisarora it is joined by the Datpadi Rever from the right, whereafter it turns south and then flows into Mohkhed Tehsil.[

== Course ==
The river receives its first tributary - a small spill off from the Kanhargaon Dam- known as the Chotti Kulbehra. It then flows southeast through Chhindwara Tehsil passing just south of the town of Chhindwara it is joined by the Bodri from the left, whereafter it turns south and then flows into Mohkhed Tehsil. Its major tributary, the Umra River, joins it from the right just south of the village of Bisapur, whereafter the Kulbehra heads east where it passes just north of the village of Chaand and joins with the Pench River just southeast of the village of Chand at 21°55′25″N 79°10′30″E.

== Tributaries ==
The river has three principle tributaries, the Chotti Kulbehra and the Umra Nala draining at its right bank and the Bodri river which is received on its left bank.

== Dams ==
The river does not have any major project constructed across it though its course is interrupted by a series of barrages. These raise the water levels upstream and allow water to be harvested for agricultural purposes. The Kanhargaon Dam and the Umariya Dalel Dam are two dams constructed within the river basin on its tributaries.
