= Sainkheda =

Town in Madhya Pradesh, India

Sainkheda dadaji dhuniwalo ki lilasthali
- Town
- Location in Madhya Pradesh, India Sainkheda (India)
- Coordinates: 22.95°N 78.58°E
- Country: India
- State: Madhya Pradesh
- District: Narsinghpur

Government
  - Type: Nagar Panchayat nagar parishad

Population (2011)
  - Total: 9,602

Languages
  - Official: Hindi
- Time zone: UTC+5:30 (IST)
- 487661: 487661
- Vehicle registration: MP-49

Sainkheda is a town and a nagar panchayat in Narsinghpur district of Madhya Pradesh in India, as well as a tehsil headquarter.

== Geography ==
Sainkheda is located at 22.95°N 78.58°E in the northwest part of district, on the bank of Dudhi River. The region is predominantly agrarian.

== Demographics ==
Sainkheda has a population of 9,602, of which 4,974 are males while 4,628 are females, per the 2011 census.

== Government ==
Sainkheda is a Nagar Panchayat city in district of Narsimhapur, Madhya Pradesh. The city is divided into 15 wards for which elections are held every 5 years. Sainkheda Nagar Panchayat has total administration over 2,762 houses to which it supplies basic amenities like water and sewage. It is also authorized to build roads within Nagar Panchayat limits and impose taxes on properties coming under its jurisdiction.

== Transportation ==
Sainkheda is situated on MP SH 44 connecting to Gairatganj, Silwani, Udaipura, Gadarwara with Narsinghpur to Raisen and Sagar, with daily bus service available.
