= Chaand, Madhya Pradesh =

Chaand
- Town
- Location in Madhya Pradesh, India Chaand (India)
- Coordinates: 21.93°N 79.14°E
- Country: India
- State: Madhya Pradesh
- District: Chhindwara

Government
  - Type: Nagar Panchayat
- Elevation: 508 m (1,667 ft)

Population (2011)
  - Total: 6,926

Languages
  - Official: Hindi
- Time zone: UTC+5:30 (IST)
- Postal code: 480115
- ISO 3166 code: IN-MP
- Vehicle registration: MP

Chaand is a Town and a Nagar Panchayat in Chhindwara District of Madhya Pradesh in India, it is also a Tehsil Headquarter.

== Geography ==
Chaand is located on 21.93°N 79.14°E. It has an average elevation of 508 metres (1669 feet). Chaand is located in Satpura Ranges on bank of Kulbehra River.

== Demographics ==
In 2011, Chaand's population was 6,926, of which 3,621 were males while 3,305 were females. In 2011, the literacy rate owas 79.06%.

== Administration ==
Chaand Nagar Panchayat has total administration over 1,452 houses to which it supplies basic amenities like water and sewerage. It is also authorize to build roads within Nagar Panchayat limits and impose taxes on properties coming under its jurisdiction.
