= Jata Chhapar =

- Census town
- Location in Madhya Pradesh, India Jata Chhapar (India)
- Coordinates: 22°13′9″N 78°42′28″E
- Country: India
- State: Madhya Pradesh
- District: Chhindwara

Population (2001)
  - Total: 3,455

Languages
  - Official: Hindi
- Time zone: UTC+5:30 (IST)
- ISO 3166 code: IN-MP
- Vehicle registration: MP

Jata Chhapar is a census town in Chhindwara district in the Indian state of Madhya Pradesh.

== Demographics ==
As of 2001 India census, Jata Chhapar had a population of 3455. Males constitute 52% of the population and females 48%. Jata Chhapar has an average literacy rate of 69%, higher than the national average of 59.5%: male literacy is 77%, and female literacy is 62%. In Jata Chhapar, 12% of the population is under 6 years of age.
