= Kali Chhapar =

- Census town
- Location in Madhya Pradesh, India Kali Chhapar (India)
- Coordinates: 22°11′59″N 78°27′9″E
- Country: India
- State: Madhya Pradesh
- District: Chhindwara

Population (2001)
  - Total: 10,692

Languages
  - Official: Hindi
- Time zone: UTC+5:30 (IST)
- ISO 3166 code: IN-MP
- Vehicle registration: MP

Kali Chhapar is a census town in Chhindwara district in the Indian state of Madhya Pradesh.

== Demographics ==
As of 2001 India census, Kali Chhapar had a population of 10,692. Males constitute 52% of the population and females 48%. Kali Chhapar has an average literacy rate of 69%, higher than the national average of 59.5%: male literacy is 77%, and female literacy is 60%. In Kali Chhapar, 11% of the population is under 6 years of age.

== Transport ==
The nearest airport is Jabalpur.
