= Chandameta-Butaria =

Chandameta
- Town
- Location in Madhya Pradesh, India Chandameta (India)
- Coordinates: 22°11′23.398″N 78°44′9.094″E
- Country: India
- State: Madhya Pradesh
- District: Chhindwara

Population (2001)
  - Total: 16,937

Languages
  - Official: Hindi
- Time zone: UTC+5:30 (IST)
- Postal code: 480447

Chandameta-Butaria is a town and a nagar panchayat in Chhindwara district in the state of Madhya Pradesh, India.

== Demographics ==
As of 2001 India census, Chandameta-Butaria had a population of 16,937. Males constitute 52% of the population and females 48%. Chandameta-Butaria has an average literacy rate of 71%, higher than the national average of 59.5%; with male literacy of 77% and female literacy of 64%. 12% of the population is under 6 years of age.

The social characteristics bear good relations between people of Hindus, Muslims and Christians. The Flower Valley school is situated here. Kendriya vidyalaya school is situated here. This town is situated around the hills. The largest school is the Govt. H. Sec. school.

== Tourism ==
Places to visit in the area include:

- Chandshah vali tekri (named after Chadnsha Vali shrine), has an old Shiva temple along with some other temples. This hill can be seen from most of the parts of the town and point out the temple and Shrine at the same place.
- Sinh Vahini Durga mandir is where most of the local people go for daily worship.
- Other places in the town include the Dadaji Samadhi Temple, Kherapati mandir, Singhvahini mandir, Chandshah vali- Chandramoulishwar mandir, and Pankaj Stadium.

== Transport ==
The nearest airport is Jabalpur.
