= National Highway 547 (India) =

National Highway in India

National Highway 547
- Map of the National Highway in red

Route information
- Length: 221 km (137 mi)

Major junctions
- From: Saoner
- To: Narsinghpur

Location
- Country: India
- States: Maharashtra, Madhya Pradesh

Highway system
- Roads in India; Expressways; National; State; Asian
← NH 47	→ NH 44

National Highway 547 is a national highway in states of Maharashtra and Madhya Pradesh in India. It is a branch of National Highway 47. It connects two primary national highways, NH47 and NH44.

== Route ==
NH547 starts in Maharashtra at Saoner - Sausar - Umranala - Chhindwara - Amarwara - Harrai - terminates at Narsinghpur in Madhya Pradesh.

== Junctions ==
Terminal with NH 47 near Saoner.

Junction with NH347 near Chhindwara.

Terminal with NH 44 near Narsinghpur.

== Toll plaza ==
There are three toll plazas located on NH-547.

Jaitpur toll plaza for Amarwara - Narsinghpur stretch.

Jungawani toll plaza for Chhindwara - Amarawara stretch.

Kelwad toll plaza for Saoner - Chhindwara stretch.

== See also ==
- List of national highways in India
- List of national highways in India by state
