= Bhandarkund railway station =

Railway station in Madhya Pradesh

Bhandarkund

General information
- Location: Bhandar, Chhindwara district, Madhya Pradesh; India
- Coordinates: 21.8364°N 78.9183°E
- Elevation: 618 metres (2,028 ft)
- System: Indian Railways station
- Platforms: 2
- Tracks: 3

Construction
- Structure type: Standard (on ground station)

Other information
- Status: Functioning
- Station code: BDKD
- Zone(s): South East Central Railway
- Division(s): Nagpur railway division

History
- Electrified: No (expected Feb. 2020)

Services
Preceding station	Indian Railways	Following station
Umranala towards ?	Bilaspur–Nagpur section Chhindwara–Nagpur branch	Kukra Khapa Halt towards ?
Location
- Location within India Location within Madhya Pradesh

Bhandarkund is a new railway station on Chhindwara–Nagpur branch line of Bilaspur–Nagpur section. It is located in Chhindwara district, Madhya Pradesh state, India. The station consists of two platforms.

== Location ==
Bhandarkund railway station serves Bhandar, a medium size village located in Mohkhed Tehsil of Chhindwara district in Madhya Pradesh. It pertains to Nagpur railway division, part of South East Central Railway zone of Indian Railways. The station lies on a new railway line between Umranala and Bhimalgondi stations, a stretch of 31 km broad-gauge single track on Chhindwara–Nagpur branch line, running eastwards of the former narrow-gauge track. Apart from this section, the rest of the narrow gauge network, once part of Satpura Railway, is being converted to broad-gauge lines.

== Services ==
As of January 2020, there are two passenger daily trains, one arriving from Indore Junction and one departing to Betul:

Number	Train name
59385	Penchvalley Fast Passenger (Indore Jn – Bhandarkund)
59396	Bhandarkund–Betul Passenger (unreserved)
