= Raja Shankar Shah University =

University in Madhya Pradesh, India

- Other name: Chhindwara University
- Motto: Jñānaṃ anaṃtaṃ
- Motto in English: Knowledge is infinite
- Type: Public
- Established: 2019; 7 years ago
- Affiliations: UGC
- Chancellor: Governor of Madhya Pradesh
- Vice-Chancellor: Prof. Indra Prasad Tripathi
- Location: Dharam Tekri, Chhindwara, Madhya Pradesh, India; 22.070°N 78.949°E
- Campus: Urban
- Website: cuc.ac.in

Raja Shankar Shah University, formerly known as Chhindwara University, is a state university in Chhindwara, Madhya Pradesh, India.

== Affiliated colleges ==
The university has jurisdiction over four districts, Balaghat, Betul, Chhindwara and Seoni.
