= Harrai =

- Town
- Location in Madhya Pradesh, India Harrai (India)
- Coordinates: 22.62°N 79.22°E
- Country: India
- State: Madhya Pradesh
- District: Chhindwara

Government
  - Body: Nagar Panchayat
- Elevation: 600 m (2,000 ft)

Population (2011)
  - Total: 11,000

Languages
  - Official: Hindi
- Time zone: UTC+5:30 (IST)
- PIN: 480224
- ISO 3166 code: IN-MP
- Vehicle registration: MP-28

Harrai is a Nagar Panchayat in Chhindwara district in the Indian state of Madhya Pradesh.

== Geography and climate ==
=== Geography ===
Harrai is located at 22.62°N 79.22°E. It has an average elevation of 588 metres (1929 feet). It is 82 km from Chhindwara district headquarter and 46 km from Narsinghpur district headquarter.

=== Climate ===
The climate in Harrai is warm and temperate. When compared with winter, the summers have much more rainfall. This location is classified as Cwa by Köppen and Geiger. The average annual temperature is 24.4 °C in Harrai. The average annual rainfall is 1145 mm. The weather data is given in the following table.

Climate data for Harrai
Month	Jan	Feb	Mar	Apr	May	Jun	Jul	Aug	Sep	Oct	Nov	Dec	Year
Mean daily maximum °C (°F)	25.1 (77.2)	28.1 (82.6)	32.9 (91.2)	37 (99)	40.1 (104.2)	35.7 (96.3)	28.8 (83.8)	28.1 (82.6)	29.2 (84.6)	29.7 (85.5)	27.5 (81.5)	25.6 (78.1)	30.7 (87.2)
Daily mean °C (°F)	17.8 (64.0)	20.2 (68.4)	24.9 (76.8)	29.3 (84.7)	33 (91)	30.4 (86.7)	25.7 (78.3)	25.2 (77.4)	25.4 (77.7)	23.8 (74.8)	19.9 (67.8)	17.6 (63.7)	24.4 (75.9)
Mean daily minimum °C (°F)	10.5 (50.9)	12.4 (54.3)	16.9 (62.4)	21.7 (71.1)	26 (79)	25.1 (77.2)	22.7 (72.9)	22.3 (72.1)	21.7 (71.1)	17.9 (64.2)	12.3 (54.1)	9.7 (49.5)	18.3 (64.9)
Average precipitation mm (inches)	15 (0.6)	12 (0.5)	21 (0.8)	9 (0.4)	11 (0.4)	128 (5.0)	324 (12.8)	337 (13.3)	229 (9.0)	38 (1.5)	8 (0.3)	13 (0.5)	1,145 (45.1)

== Demographics ==
As of the 2011 Census of India, Harrai had a population of 11,000. Males constitute 50.64% of the population and females 49.36%. Harrai has an average literacy rate of 79.3%, higher than the national average of 74.04%: male literacy is 85.10%, and female literacy is 73.27%. In Harrai, 13.04% of the population is under 6 years of age.

== Transport ==
The nearest airport is Jabalpur (130 km). The nearest railway station is Narsinghpur which is 44 km. Harrai is on Chhindwara-Narsinghpur road which connects it to Chhindwara, Narsinghpur, Jabalpur, Nagpur and Pachmarhi. Also buses are available from this cities for Harrai.
