= Deogarh Fort =

Historical fort in Madhya Pradesh, India

- Deogarh Mahal
- Part of Deogarh
- Chhindwara, Madhya Pradesh in India
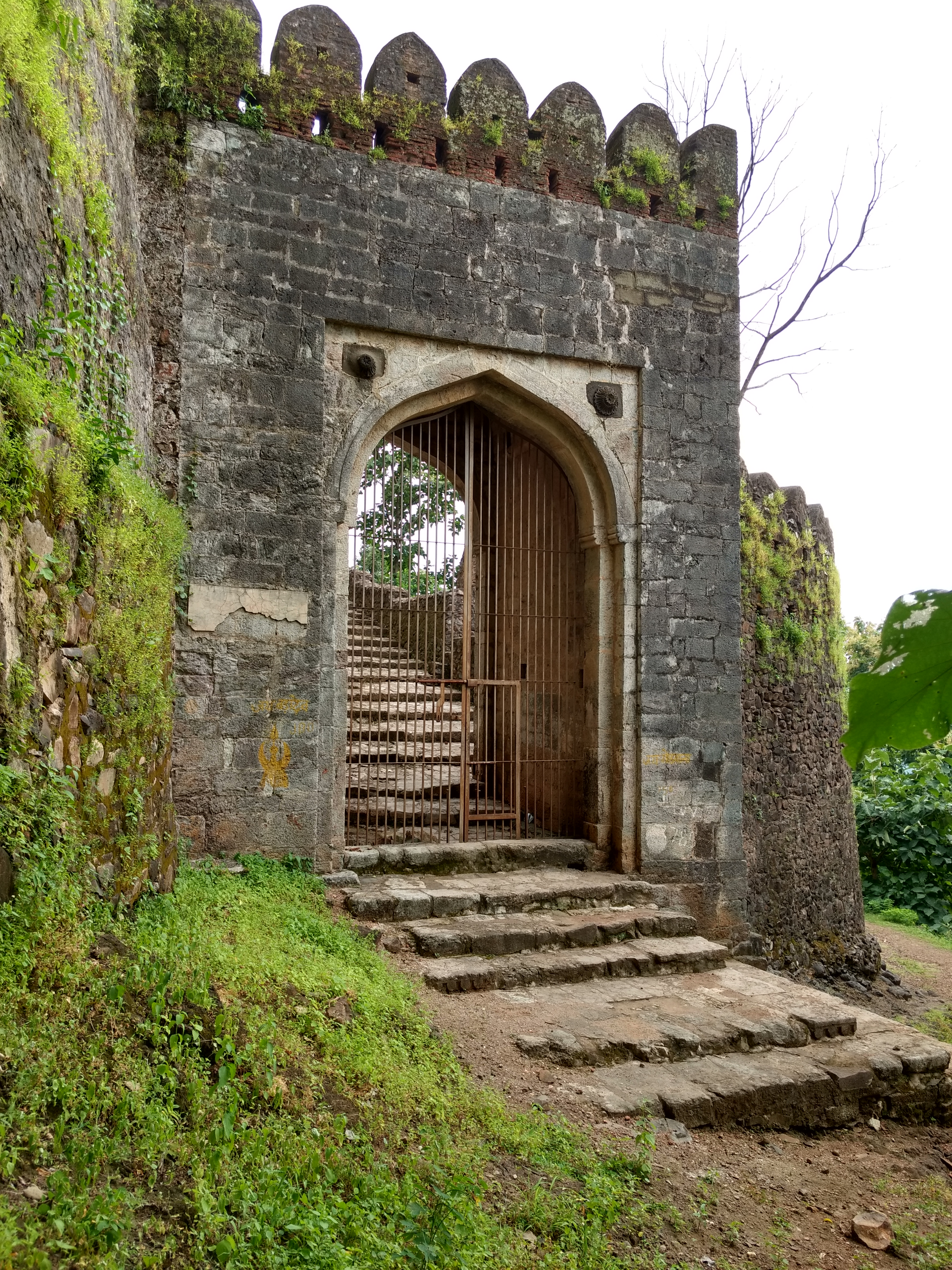
- Deogarh Fort, Chhindwara

Site information
- Type: Fort
- Controlled by: Government of Madhya Pradesh
- Open to the public: Yes
- Condition: Dilapidated; Vacant

Location
- Location within Madhya Pradesh
- Coordinates: 21°52′58″N 78°43′58″E

Site history
- Built: 15th century
- Built by: King Jatba (Gond Dynasty)
- Materials: Stone and brick

The Deogarh Fort or Devgarh Fort is an old fort in Chhindwara district, Madhya Pradesh, India. It was the capital of a Gond Dynasty and is in the village of Devgarh, 42 km from the district headquarters Chhindwara and 22 km from Umranala . It spreads over a hill 650 m (2132.55 ft) high.

== Geography ==
Deogarh Fort is located in the southern part of Madhya Pradesh, 42 km (26.1 mi) from the district headquarters of Chhindwara. It has over 100 rooms and has murals on pillars, balconies and the walls.

The fort is on a hill 625 m (2050.52 ft) high, in the Deogarh village of development block Mohkhed, between a dense forest and a deep moat.

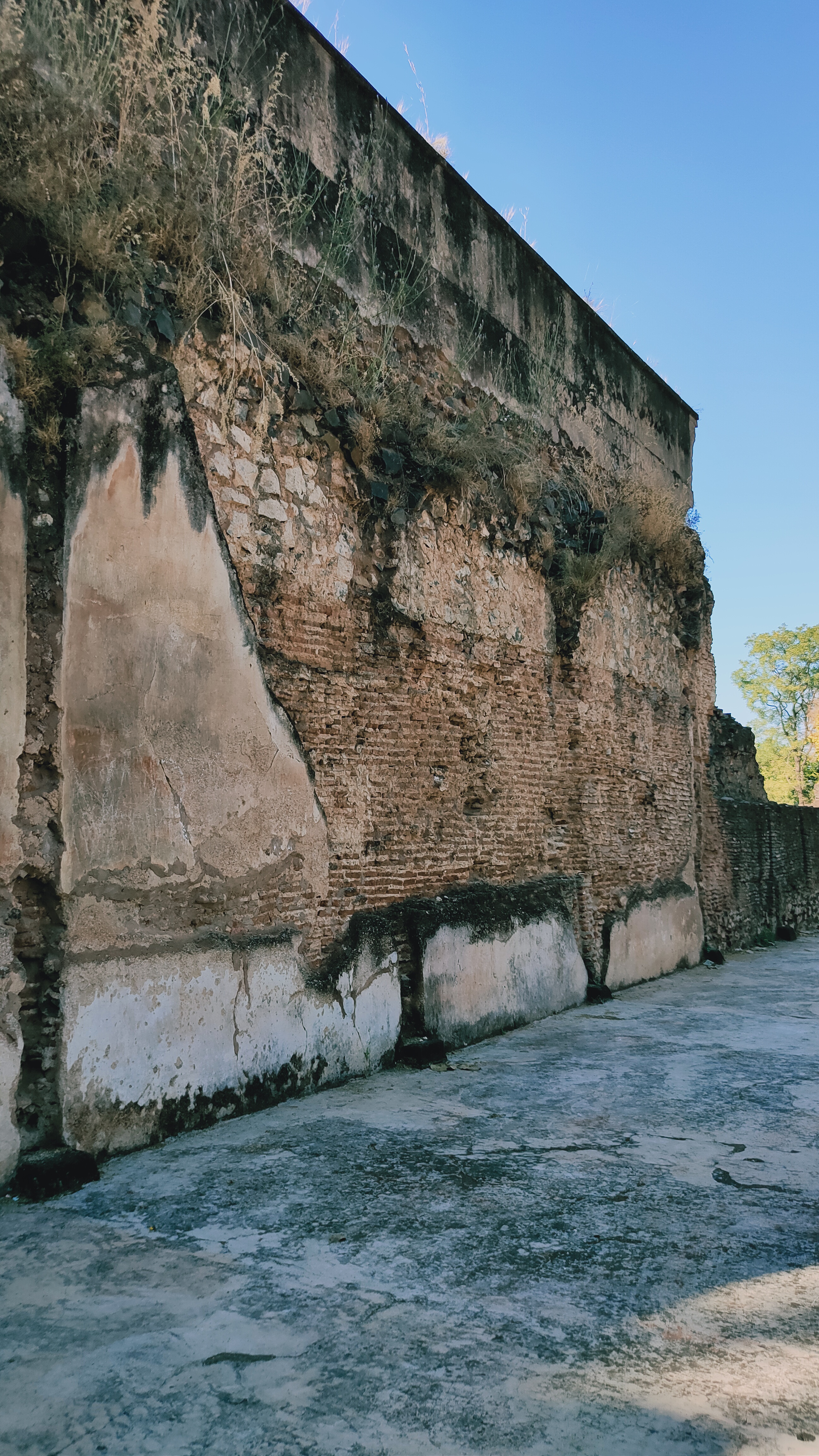
Deogarh Fort
