= Mohgaon =

Mohgaon Haveli
- Town
- Location in Madhya Pradesh, India Mohgaon Haveli (India)
- Coordinates: 21°38′21″N 78°44′12″E
- Country: India
- State: Madhya Pradesh
- District: Pandhurna
- Elevation: 366 m (1,201 ft)

Population (2001)
  - Total: 9,890

Languages
  - Official: Hindi
- Time zone: UTC+5:30 (IST)
- ISO 3166 code: IN-MP
- Vehicle registration: MP

Mohgaon is a town and a nagar parishad in Pandhurna District in the Indian state of Madhya Pradesh.

== Geography ==
Mohgaon haveli is located at 21.65°N 78.72°E. It has an average elevation of 366 metres (1,200 feet).

== Demographics ==
As of 2001 India census, Mohgaon haveli had a population of 9,890. Males constitute 52% of the population and females 48%. Mohgaon haveli has an average literacy rate of 62%, higher than the national average of 59.5%: male literacy is 69%, and female literacy is 55%. In Mohgaon, 14% of the population is under 6 years of age.
