= Dongar Parasia =

Parasia Dongar Parasia
- city
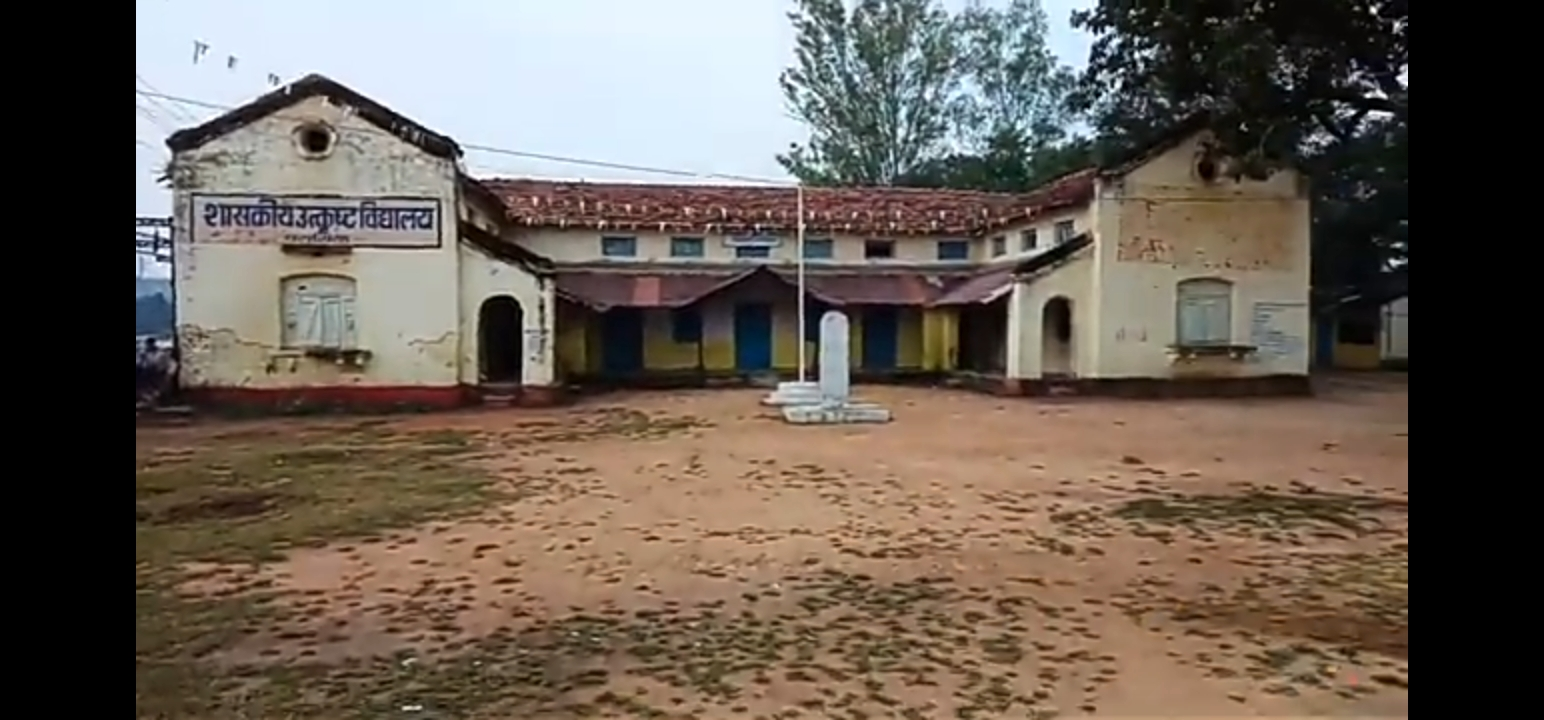
- Penchvelly School

- Location in Madhya Pradesh, India Parasia (India)
- Coordinates: 22°11′36″N 78°47′44″E
- Country: India
- State: Madhya Pradesh
- District: Chhindwara

Population (2011)
  - Total: 42,786

Languages
  - Official: Hindi
- Time zone: UTC+5:30 (IST)

Parasia, formerly known as Dongar Parasia, is a tehsil and a municipality in Chhindwara district in the state of Madhya Pradesh, India.

== Demographics ==
As of the 2011 Census of India, Dongar Parasia (Parasia), the biggest division and tehsil of Chhindwara district in Madhya Pradesh, had a population of 193,000. Males constitute 51% of the population and females 49%. Dongar Parasia has an average literacy rate of 75%, higher than the national average of 74% in 2011: male literacy is 81% and female literacy is 70%. In Dongar Parasia, 12% of the population is under 6 years of age.

== Education ==
Parasia has primary and secondary schools and colleges. There is also a library named EKLAVYA which contains about 20,000 books.

== Places to visit ==
There are many tourist attractions close to Parasia, where people visiting the town can go revel in the nature. The important spots are Kosmi (Shri Hanuman Mandir), Tamia - a point from where you can view over 100 km^{2} of forest with naked eyes, Devrani Dai - a drive through pristine forest and fields.

== Coal mining ==
Parasia is known as the "Coal Mines Belt". There were 24 mines in this area, of which 20 are still working. The principal ones are Eklahara Mines, Burkuhi Mines, Chandametta Mines, Newton Mines, Donger Chikhali Mines, Mahadev Puri Mines. Ravanwara Mines, Ravanwara Khash, Vishnu Puri No. 11, Vishnu Puri No. 12, Chhinda Mines, Setiya Mines, Shivpuri Mines, Shivpuri Mines, Jhhury Mines, Mathani Mines, Thisgora Mines, Nahariya Mines, Pench Mines, and Urdhan Project.

Parasia has the head office of Pench Area, Western Coalfields Limited (WCL) — one of the eight subsidiary companies of Coal India Limited (CIL) which is under the administrative control of the Ministry of Coal. The company incorporated under the Companies Act, 1956.

== Transport ==
The nearest airport is Nagpur.

It has also a railway station on Amla Chhindwara link line, Patalkot Express and Penchvely Express halt in Parasia.

It's connected Chhindwara with roadways. Pipariya, Sarni, Junnardeo and Betul also connected with Road and Bus Services.
