= Junnardeo =

Junnardeo Jamai
- city
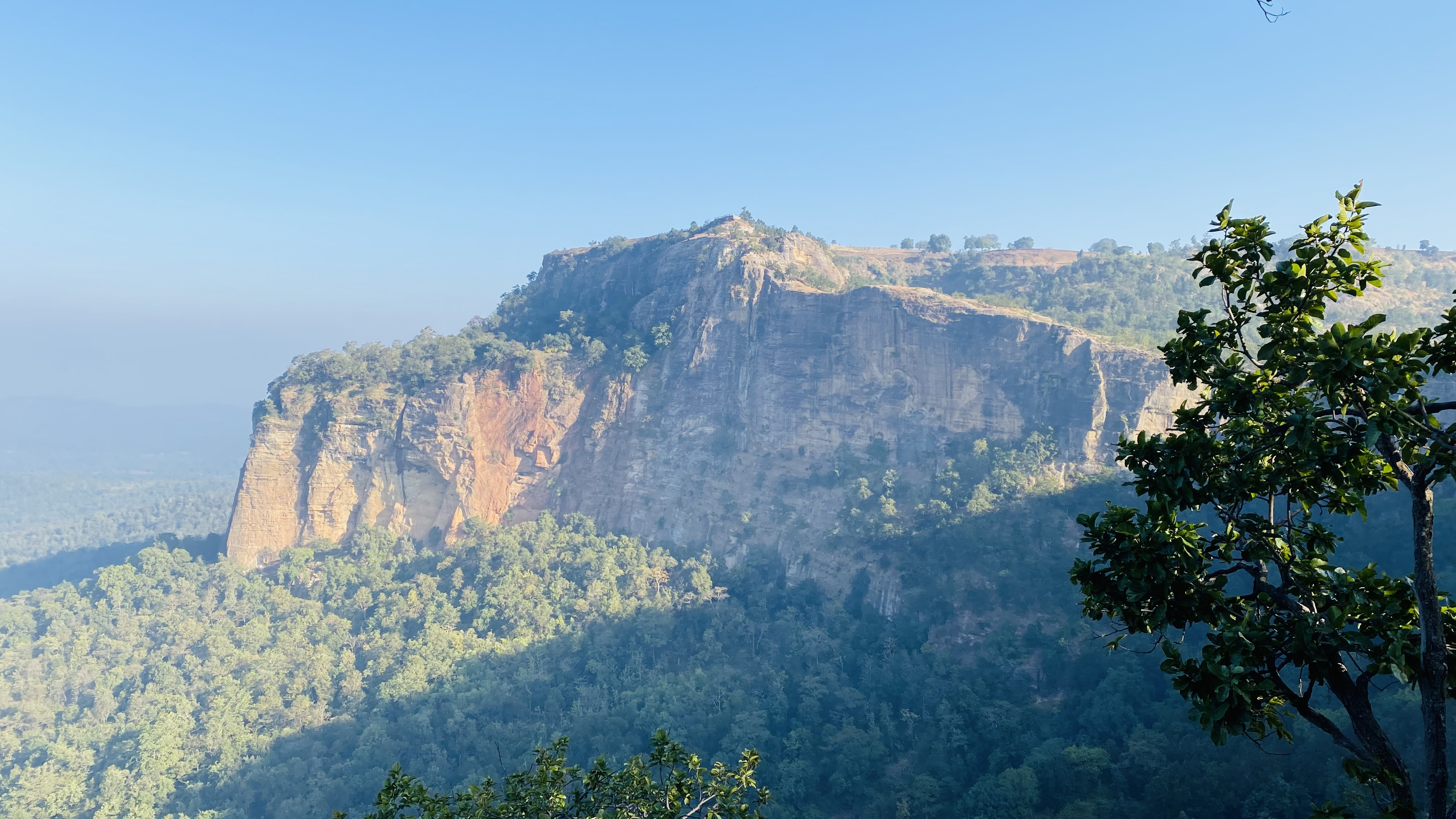
- Mahadev hills Tamia, Junnardeo

- Location in Madhya Pradesh, India Junnardeo (India)
- Coordinates: 22.2°N 78.58°E
- Country: India
- State: Madhya Pradesh
- District: Chhindwara
- Elevation: 748 m (2,454 ft)

Population (2001)
  - Total: 22,426

Languages
  - Official: Hindi and English
  - Regional: Hindi, and Gondi
- Time zone: UTC+5:30 (IST)
- PIN: 480551
- ISO 3166 code: IN-MP
- Vehicle registration: MP-28

Junnardeo (also spelled as Junnardev or Junnordeo), also known as Jamai, is a city and a municipality in Chhindwara district in the Indian state of Madhya Pradesh, India. Junnardeo is the head office of the Kanhan area of WCL. It has Asia's largest Coal Wash Plant.

== Educational institutions ==
Junnardeo is home to several prominent educational institutions, including higher education and school-level establishments. For higher education, the town has Government Junnardeo College, Vidya Devi Shukla Mahavidyalaya (VDSM), and Government Industrial Training Institute (Govt ITI). At the school level, notable institutions include Shri Nandlal Sood Government Integrated Excellence Higher Secondary School, Government Girls Higher Secondary School, Pandit Ravishankar Shukla Higher Secondary School, and Eklavya Model Residential School. Other significant schools in the area include Kendriya Vidyalaya, Step Forward Public School, Gyan Sagar Public School, Kanhan Valley School Dungariya, and Government Higher Secondary School Hanotiya. These institutions provide a range of educational opportunities for students in the region.

== Industries ==
=== Coal mines ===
Junnardeo, about 50 km from Chhindwara, is the head office of the Kanhan area of WCL. It has Asia's largest coal wash plant. It has around 15+ coal mines in the Kanhan area. It has a big railway coal transportation and its own importance in railways.

== Demographics ==
Junnardeo Town has population As of 2001 Madhya Pradesh, India census 22,583,

== Geography ==
Junnardeo is located at 22.2°N 78.58°E. It has an average elevation of 748 metres (2,454 feet).

== Tourist attractions ==
- Patalkot
- Patalkot Sunset Point
- Junnardeo Hills
- Tamia Hills
- Junnardeo Pahali Payari
- Hinglaj Mata Mandir
- Lodheshwar Mahadev Mandir

== Notable people ==
- Mudgal Singh, Freedom Fighter

== Transportation ==
Junnardeo is well-connected by both road and rail. The town is linked to nearby major cities, including Chhindwara, Jabalpur, and Nagpur, through regular private bus services and a well-developed road network. Local transport options, such as auto-rickshaws, further enhance connectivity. Junnardeo railway station also connects the town to key cities in Madhya Pradesh and beyond, offering efficient rail services for passengers and freight. This combination of road and rail infrastructure ensures easy access to and from Junnardeo.
