= Bichhua =

Town in Madhya Pradesh, India

Bichhua Bichhua
- Town
- Location in Madhya Pradesh, India Bichhua (India)
- Coordinates: 21.81°N 79.03°E
- Country: India
- State: Madhya Pradesh
- District: Chhindwara

Population (2011)
  - Total: 6,678

Languages
  - Official: Hindi
- Time zone: UTC+5:30 (IST)
- Postal code: 480115
- ISO 3166 code: IN-MP
- Vehicle registration: MP

Bichhua is a town and a Nagar Parishad in Chhindwara District of Madhya Pradesh. It is also a Tehsil Headquarter.

== Geography ==
Bichhua is located in Satpura Ranges. Bichhua is located on 21.81°N 79.03°E It has an average elevation of 508 metres (1669 feet).

== Population ==
In 2011, Bichhua's population was 6,678. of which 3,343 were males and 3,335 were females.
