= Western Coalfields =

Indian government-owned company

Western Coalfields Limited (WCL)
- Type: Public Sector Undertaking
- Industry: Mining
- Founded: 1975; 51 years ago
- Headquarters: Nagpur, Maharashtra, India
- Area served: India
- Key people: Jai Prakash Dwivedi (Chairman & MD)
- Products: Coal
- Owner: Government of India
- Website: www.westerncoal.in

Western Coalfields Limited (WCL) is one of the eight subsidiary companies of Coal India Limited (CIL) which is under administrative control of the Ministry of Coal, Government of India. The Company incorporated under the Companies Act, 1956 has its registered office at Coal Estate, Civil Lines, Nagpur–440001. WCL has been conferred "Miniratna" status on 15 March 2007. The company has contributed about 6.7% of the national coal production during 2014–15. It has mining operation spread over the states of Maharashtra (in Nagpur, Chandrapur & Yavatmal Districts) and Madhya Pradesh (in Betul and Chhindawara Districts). The company is a major source of supplies of coal to the industries located in Western India in the States of Maharashtra, Madhya Pradesh, Gujarat and also in Southern India in the States of Andhra Pradesh, Tamil Nadu, Karnataka and Kerala. A large numbers of Power Houses under Maharashtra, Madhya Pradesh, Gujarat, Karnataka, Punjab and Uttar Pradesh - Electricity Boards are major consumers of its coal along with cement, steel, chemical, fertilizer, paper and brick Industries in these states.

Mr. Manoj Kumar is the present chairman and managing director of Western Coalfields. The total production of the Western Coalfields limited stood at 57.64.15 MT during 2019–20 against 39.73 MT during 2013–14, an increase of 3.6%. The firm has set up 20 new coal projects of 40 MT per annum capacity since 2014–15. Western Coalfields Ltd has launched a roadmap to achieve beyond 75 million tonnes of output by FY 2023-24 as its contribution towards the ambitious 1 billion tonnes target of parent firm Coal India.

On 6 June 2020, Western Coalfields inaugurated two mines in Madhya Pradesh and one mine in Maharashtra. Adasa UG to OC Mine in Nagpur and Two mines in Chhindwara Sharda mines in Kanhan Area and Dhankhasa mines in Pench Area.
