= National Highway 347 (India) =

National Highway in India

National Highway 347
- Map of the National Highway in red

Route information
- Length: 158 km (98 mi)

Major junctions
- From: Multai
- To: Seoni

Location
- Country: India
- States: Madhya Pradesh

Highway system
- Roads in India; Expressways; National; State; Asian
| ← NH 47 | → NH 44 |

National Highway 347 is a national highway in state of Madhya Pradesh in India. It is a branch of National Highway 47. It connects two primary highways, NH47 and NH44.

== Route ==
Multai - Chikhli Kalan - Dunawa - Ghatpipriya - Saori - Chhindwara - Chaurai Khas - Seoni

== Junctions ==
NH 47 Terminal near Multai.
NH 547 near Chhindwara.
NH 44 Terminal near Seoni.

== Toll plaza ==
There are two toll plazas located on NH-347.

- Chikhalikala toll plaza for Multaichhindwara - Seroni stretch.
- Fulara toll plaza for Chhindwara (Ring Road)-Seoni stretch.

== See also ==
- List of national highways in India
- List of national highways in India by state
