= Chourai =

Chorai
- village
- Location in Rajasthan, India Chorai (India)
- Coordinates: 24.06234°N 73.83109°E
- Country: India
- State: Rajasthan
- District: Udaipur

Languages
  - Official: Hindi
- Time zone: UTC+5:30 (IST)
- PIN: 313903
- ISO 3166 code: RJ-IN
- Vehicle registration: RJ27

Chorai is a village in Rishabhdeo tehsil, Udaipur district, Rajasthan, India.
