= Chhindwara district =

District of Madhya Pradesh, India

Coordinates: 22°03′36″N 78°56′24″E

- District
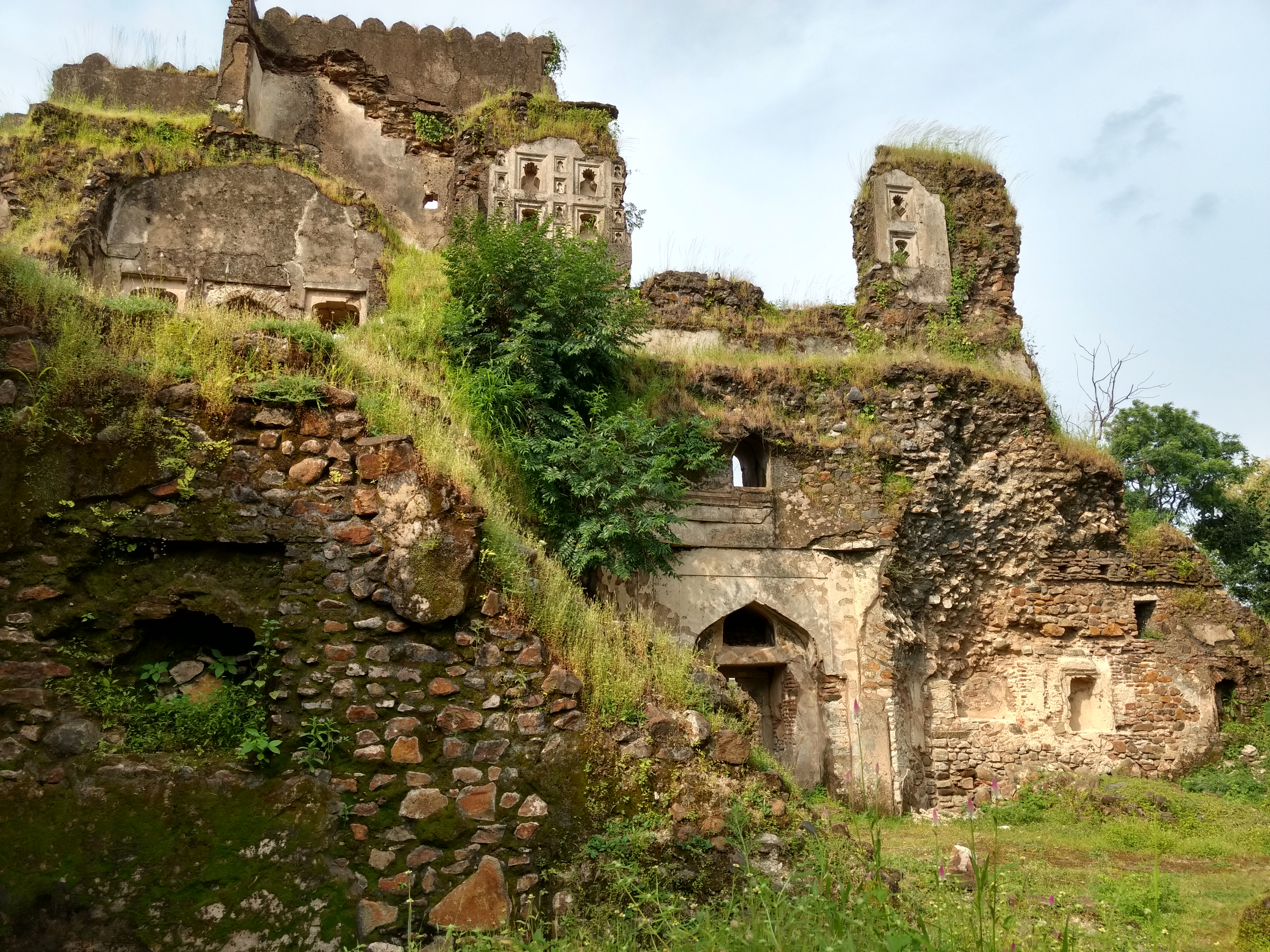
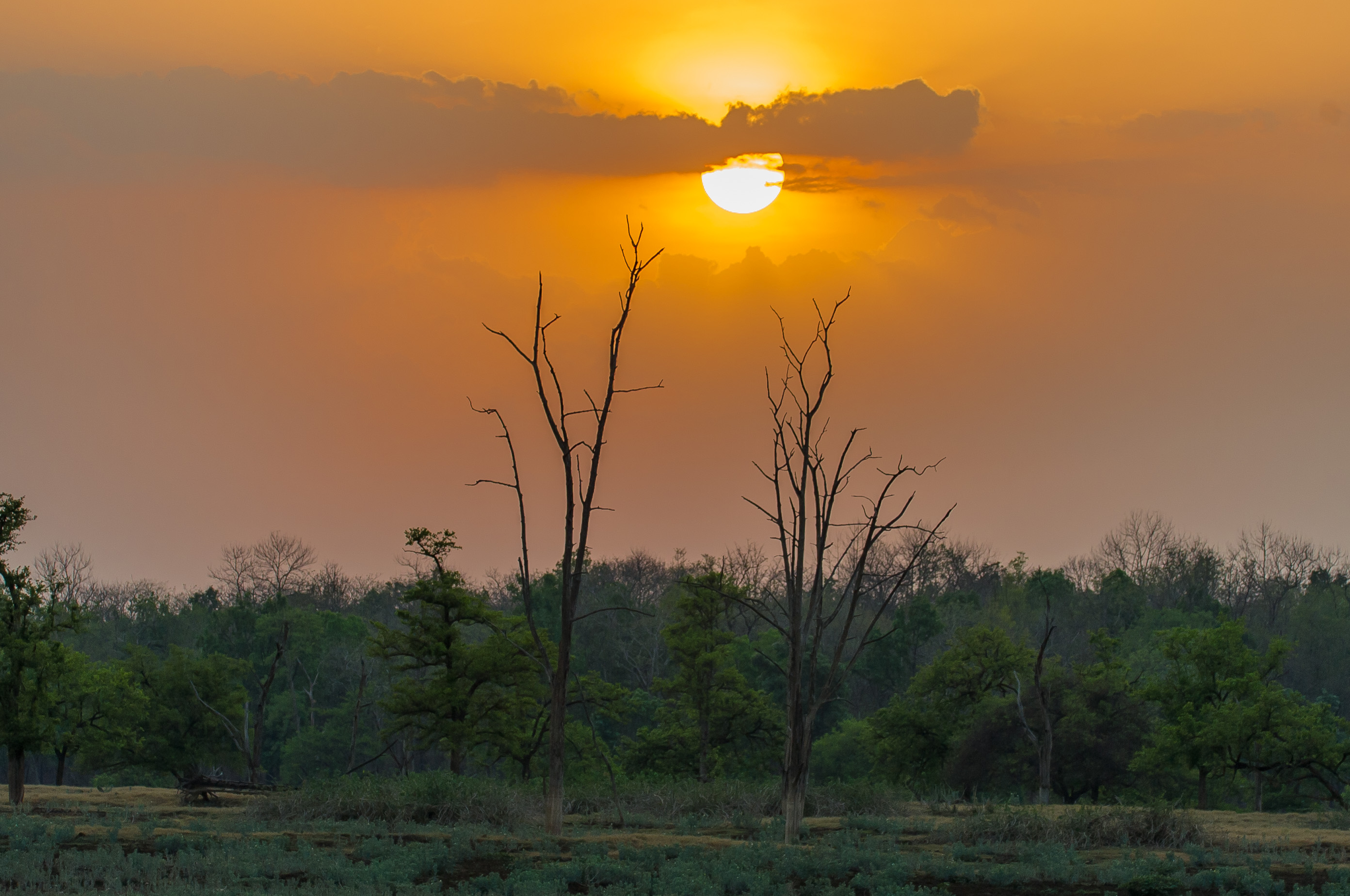
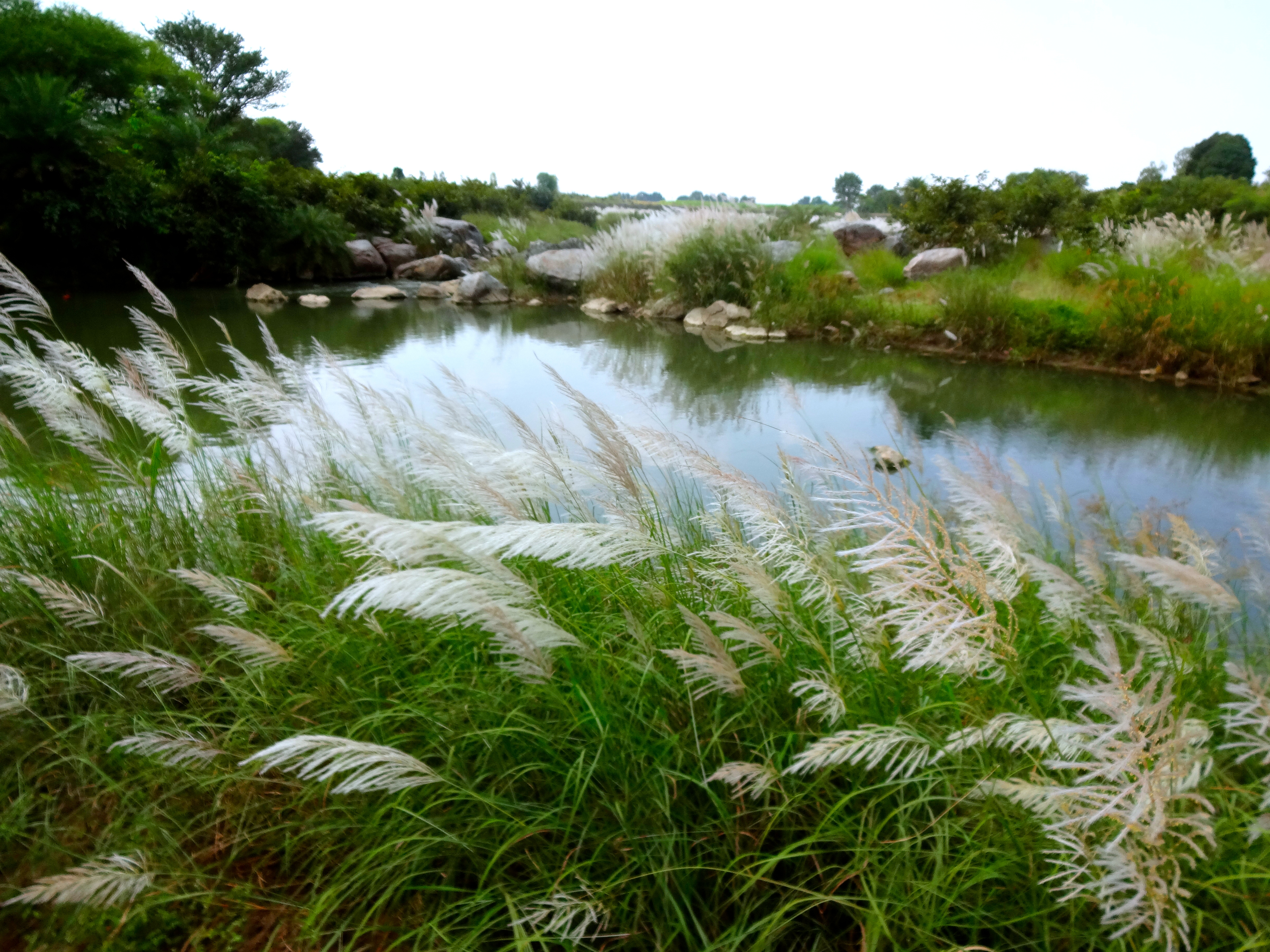
- Top: Badal Mahal, Deogarh Fort; Bottom: Pench National Park, Kulbehra River at Chhindwara

- Location of Chhindwara district in Madhya Pradesh
- Country: India
- State: Madhya Pradesh
- Division: Jabalpur
- Established: 1 November 1956
- Headquarters: Chhindwara
- Tehsils: 11

Government
  - Lok Sabha constituencies: Chhindwara

Area
  - Total: 10,293 km^{2} (3,974 sq mi)

Population (2011)
  - Total: 1,716,612
  - Density: 166.77/km^{2} (431.94/sq mi)

Demographics
  - Literacy: 72.21%
  - Sex ratio: 966
- Time zone: UTC+05:30 (IST)
- Major highways: 47, 347, 547
- Website: chhindwaranagarnigam.com, chhindwara.nic.in

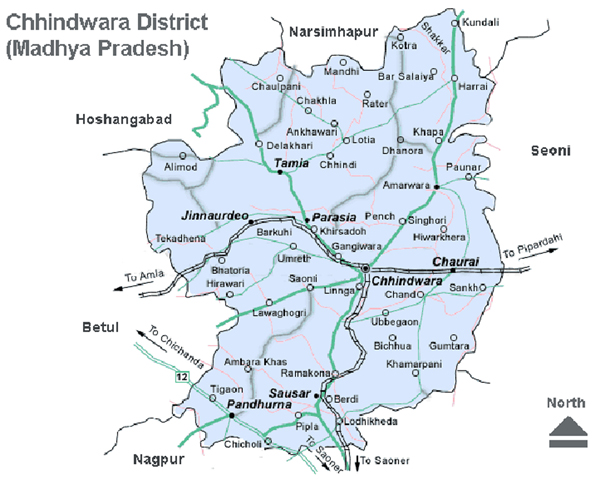
Map of Chhindwara District

Chhindwara district (Hindi pronunciation: [t͡ʃʰɪn̪d̪ʋaːɽaː]) is a district of Madhya Pradesh state in India, and Chhindwara town is the district headquarters. Chhindwara was the largest district in Madhya Pradesh with an area of 10,293 square km before the bifurcation of Pandhurna district. The district is part of Jabalpur division. chindwara district is located in south part of Madhya Pradesh and Chhindwara District, located in the Satpura Range of Madhya Pradesh, India

The name Chhindwara has been derived from the word Chhind, the local name of a tree found commonly in the district. Chhindwara district was formed on 1 November 1956.

It is on the southwest region of the Satpura Range. It is spread from 21.28 to 22.49 deg. North (latitude) and 78.40 to 79.24 deg. East (longitude) and spread over an area of 11,815 km^{2}. This district is bound by the plains of Pandhurna district and Nagpur district (in Maharashtra State) on the south, Narmadapuram and Narsinghpur districts on the north, Betul district on the west and Seoni district on the east.

== History ==
The early history of Chhindwara is not well-known. Based on copper-plate inscriptions found in Chhindwara and neighbouring Seoni districts, it was speculated that the Vakatakas were in power here until the 3rd century CE. By the late 7th century their power faded and the dynasty was ruled by the Gaulis. The southern part of the district, like the Nagpur plain to the south, was ruled by the Rashtrakutas for several centuries. A copper plate inscription from the 9th century CE gives a village named Mohagrama to a Kannada Brahmin, which some scholars have identified as Mohgaon in southern Chhindwara.

Until the emergence of the Gond dynasties in the 14th century, Chhindwara's early history remains poorly documented. The western part of the district may have formed part of the Kherla kingdom in neighbouring Betul. Deogarh, on the Chhindwara plateau, is believed to have been the last seat of Gauli power. According to legend, the founder of the Gond dynasty, Jatba (also spelled Jatva), slew the Gauli chiefs Ransur and Ghamsur during a temple festival, thereby establishing Gond rule in the region. For a time, the Deogarh kingdom was the most powerful of the four Gond states, but it subsequently became a tribute-paying *sarkar* under the Mughal administration of the Berar subah. The Deogarh *sarkar* included parts of the present-day districts of Chhindwara and Nagpur. King Bakht Buland was one of the most powerful rulers of the dynasty and adopted Islam during the reign of the Mughal emperor Aurangzeb. Under his leadership, Deogarh expanded its territories and gained considerable autonomy from Mughal control. Bakht Buland resided primarily in Deogarh and conquered extensive territories belonging to the neighbouring kingdoms of Mandla and Chanda. As Mughal power weakened, he took the opportunity to attack Mughal territories on both sides of the Wardha River. He and his sons encouraged the migration of non-tribal cultivators to the Berar plains and the surrounding plateau region. The Panwar Rajputs, who migrated from Malwa to the Bhoyargarh (Bhanwargarh/Bhorgarh) fort in the Betul region, were also reportedly encouraged by Bakht Buland to settle in Deogarh and other parts of Chhindwara. Following the death of Chand Sultan, one of his illegitimate sons claimed the throne, prompting Chand Sultan's widow to seek assistance from the Marathas. The Marathas subsequently conquered Deogarh, incorporating it into the territories of the Bhonsles of Nagpur.

On 17 September 1803, the British East India Company had taken over this kingdom by defeating Raghoji II Bhonsle, starting the British rule. Nagpur state continued to administer the territory until in 1853 it was annexed as part of the Doctrine of Lapse. After the 1857 rebellion, Chhindwara district became part of the Nerbudda Division of the Central Provinces and Berar, which became the state of Madhya Bharat (later Madhya Pradesh) after India's independence in 1947. After Independence, Nagpur was made the capital of Chhindwara District, and on 1 November 1956, when Maharashtra was formed and took Nagpur, this district was re-constituted with Chhindwara as the capital.

== Geography ==
The altitude of the district varies from 1,550 ft (470 m) to 3,820 ft (1,160 m) above sea level with an average elevation of 2215 feet (675 m).

There are five major rivers which flow through the district — the Kanhan, the Pench, the Jam River, the Kulbehra, the Shakkar River and the Dudhi River.

== Administration ==
The district is divided into 11 tehsils:

1. Amarwara
2. Bichhua
3. Chand
4. Chourai
5. Harrai
6. Junnardeo
7. Mohkhed
8. Parasia
9. Tamia
10. Umreth
11. Chhindwara

9 Development Blocks: Chhindwara, Parasia, Junnardeo, Damua, Tamia, Amarwara, Chourai, Bichhua, Harrai and Mohkhed

There is one Nagar Nigam (Chhindwara), 5 Nagar Palikas (Parasia, Junnardeo, Damua, Amarwara, Chourai), 6 Nagar Panchayats (Chandameta-Butaria, Newton Chikhli Kalan, Chand, Barkhui, Bichhua, and Harrai). Apart from this there are eleven small towns (Umranala, Dighawani, Jata Chhapar, Iklehra, Pagara, Kali Chhapar, Damua, Pala Chourai, Bhamodi, Ambada and Barkuhi).

== Demographics ==
Historical population
Year	Pop.	±% p.a.
1901	407,999	—
1911	517,109	+2.40%
1921	491,835	−0.50%
1931	573,272	+1.54%
1941	610,707	+0.63%
1951	646,430	+0.57%
1961	785,535	+1.97%
1971	989,413	+2.33%
1981	1,233,131	+2.23%
1991	1,568,702	+2.44%
2001	1,849,283	+1.66%
2011	2,090,922	+1.24%

Religions in residual Chhindwara district (2011)
Religion	Percent
Hinduism	92.84%
Islam	5.10%
Other (tribal religion)	0.86%
Jainism	0.41%
Other or not stated	0.79%

According to the 2011 census Chhindwara District has a population of 2,090,922, This gives it a ranking of 218th in India (out of a total of 640). The district has a population density of 177 inhabitants per square kilometre (460/sq mi). Its population growth rate over the decade 2001-2011 was 13.03%. Chhindwara has a sex ratio of 966 females for every 1000 males, and a literacy rate of 72.21%. 24.16% of the population lives in urban areas. Scheduled Castes and Scheduled Tribes made up 11.11% and 36.82% of the population respectively.

After the bifurcation of Pandhurna district, Chhindwara district had a population of 1,716,612. Chhindwara has a sex ratio of 968 females per 1000 males and a literacy rate of 69.43%. 23.09% of the population lives in urban areas. Scheduled Castes and Scheduled Tribes made up 194,788 (11.35%) and 673,263 (39.22%) of the population respectively.

There are 1,984 villages in the district, out of which 1,903 villages are inhabited. It is divided into 19 Revenue Circles, 319 Patwari Halkas. There are 808 Panchayats in the district. Chhindwara is the Parliamentary Constituency in the district and there are eight assembly segments (Junnardeo, Chhindwara, Parasia, Damua, Amarwara, Chourai, Sausar and Pandhurna). As per Census 2001 the population of Chhindwara town was 1,22,309 and of the district is 18,48,882 with a population density of 156 people per km^{2}. There are 953 females for every 1000 males.

The sex ratio of rural Chhindwara is more (962) than that of urban Chhindwara (926). As per Census 2001, the average literacy rate of the district was 66.03%, which is above the average of the MP state's 64.08%. The literacy rate in the rural area of the district is 60.76% and that of urban area is 81.46%.

Hindus are 92.01%, Muslims are 4.82% and Buddhists are 1.17%. Other religions (mainly tribal traditions) are 1.23%.

=== Languages ===
Languages of residual Chhindwara district (2011)
1. Hindi (93.0%)
2. Gondi (2.47%)
3. Korku (1.88%)
4. Marathi (1.73%)
5. Others (0.95%)

At the time of the 2011 Census of India, 92.97% of the population in the residual district spoke Hindi, 2.47% Gondi, 1.88% Korku and 1.73% Marathi as their first language.

Hindi is the primary language throughout the district. The local dialect in Chhindwara is a variant of western Hindi related to Bundeli. The Bhoyari-Pawari dialect of the Rajasthani-Malvi language is spoken exclusively by the people of the Kshatriya Pawar (Bhoyar-Pawar) caste. Gondi was formerly spoken by over 30% of the population in 1931, and over 75% of Gonds. This percentage has decreased rapidly as most Gonds have shifted to Hindi. Today, it is only spoken by shrinking minorities in Junnardeo, Mokhed and Bichhua tehsils and has vanished everywhere else. Korku, primarily the Mawasi dialect, is spoken in the same regions as Gondi and is experiencing a similar steep decline. In Patalkot, Tamia tehsil, is spoken the poorly-known Bhariati language, an unclassified Indo-Aryan language. All three tribal languages are highly endangered.

== Villages ==
- Delakhari

== Climate ==
Chhindwara has a subtropical climate bordering tropical wet and dry climate. It has a hot, dry summer (April–June) followed by monsoon rains (July–September) and a cool and relatively dry winter. Average annual rainfall is 1,183 mm. Minimum temperature during winter is 4 to 6 degrees Celsius while maximum temperature during summer is 38 to 42 degrees Celsius.

== Radio & Broadcasting Service ==
- Radio Chhindwara Live -City Radio, City Local Radio.

| website = radiochhindwara.live, radiochhindwara.live

== Universities ==
- Raja Shankar Shah University, Chhindwara

== Tourism ==
Notable sites include Tamia Hills and Deogarh Fort.
