= Chhindwara =

City in Madhya Pradesh, India

- City
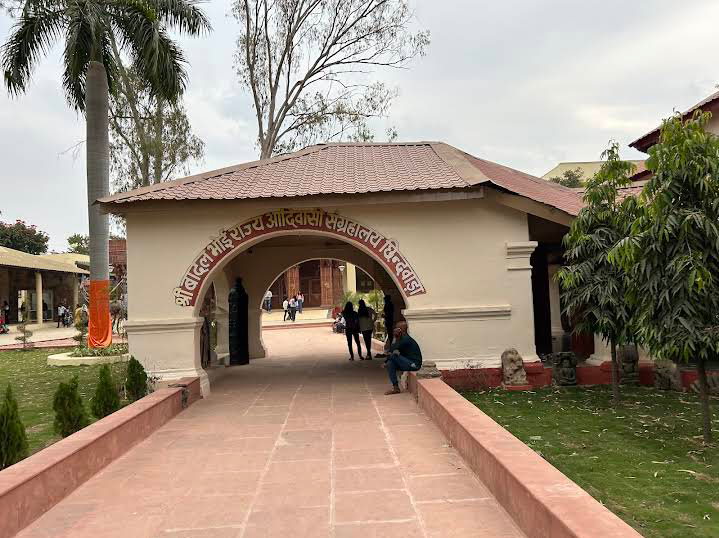
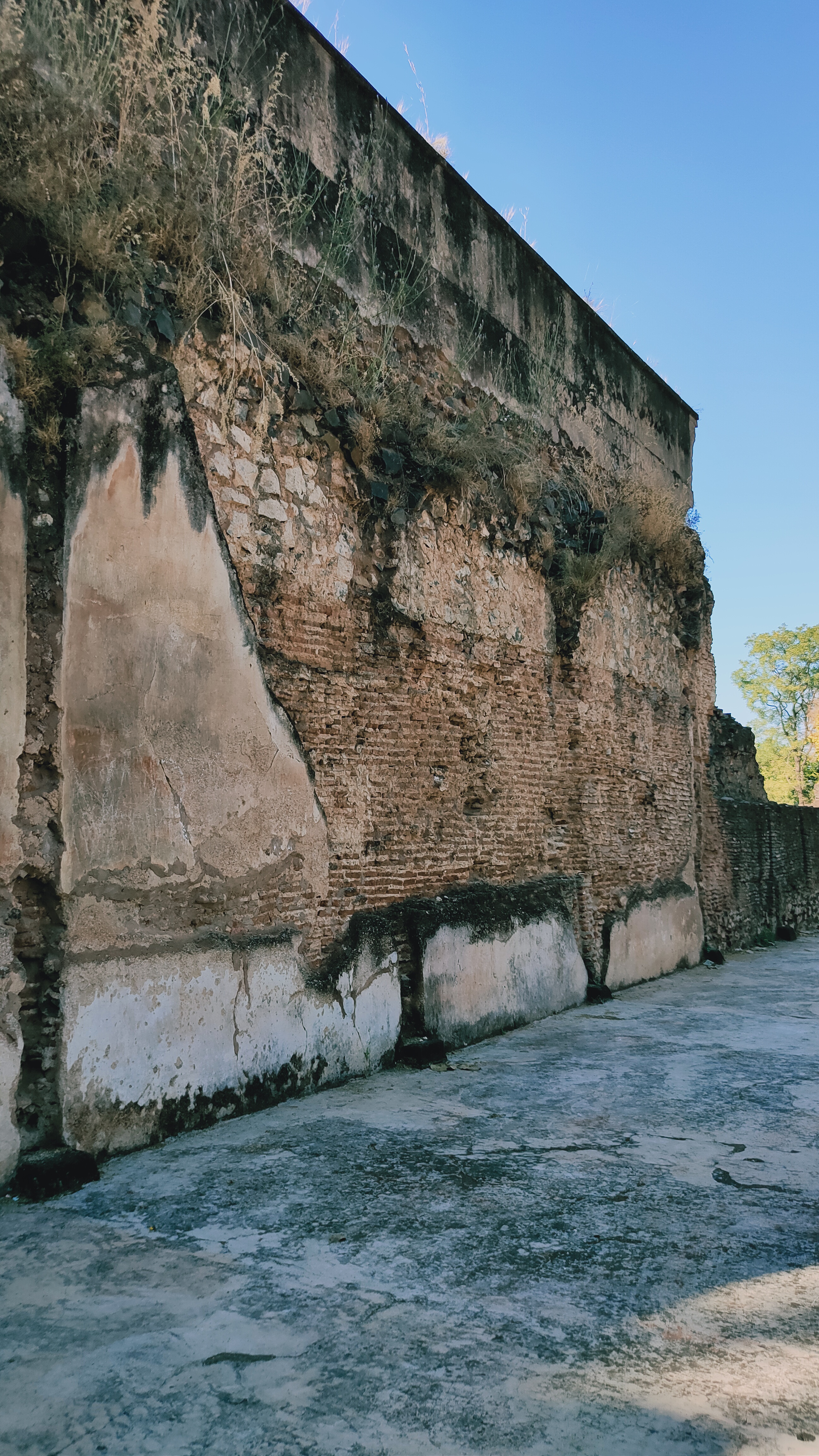
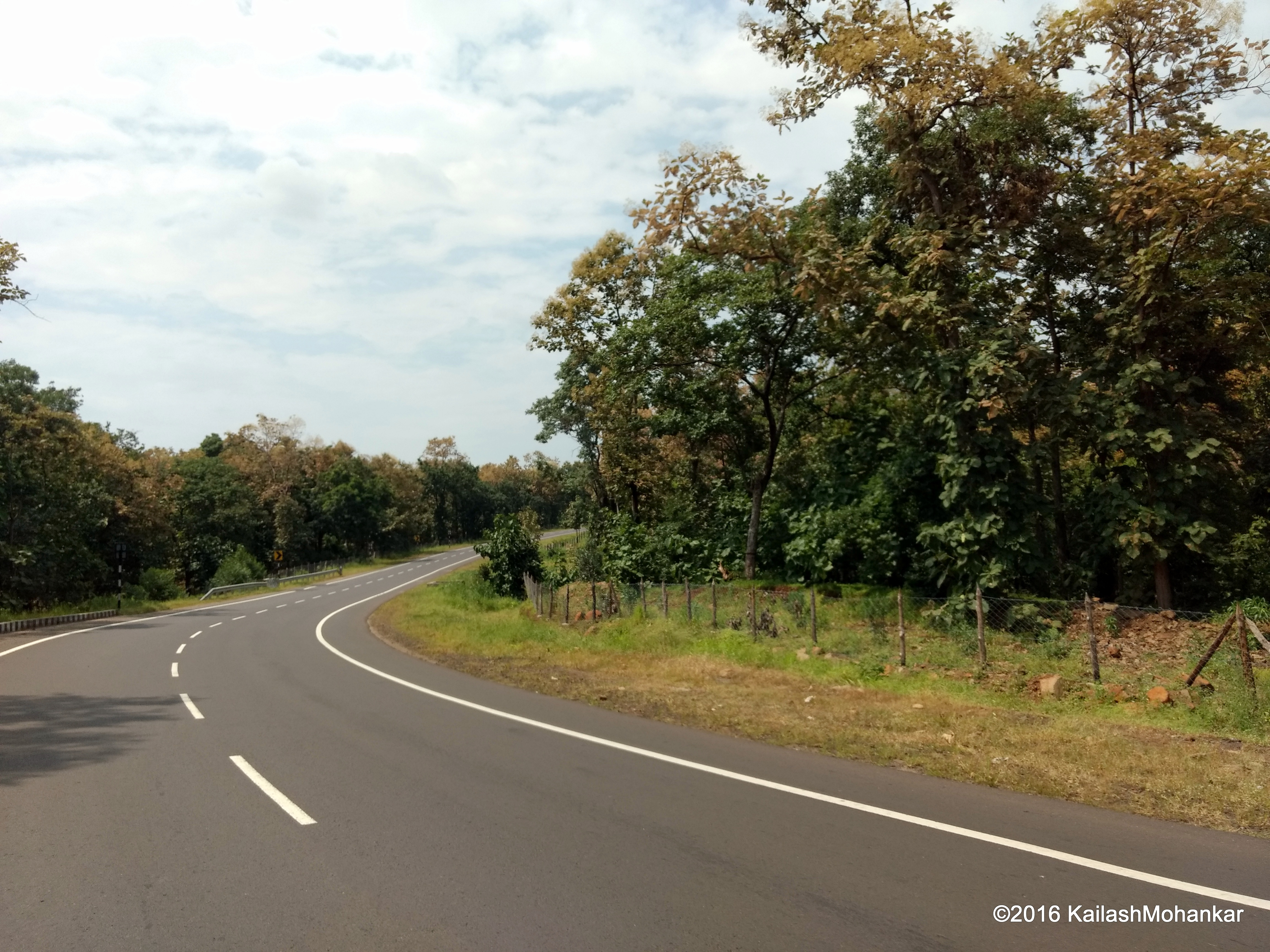
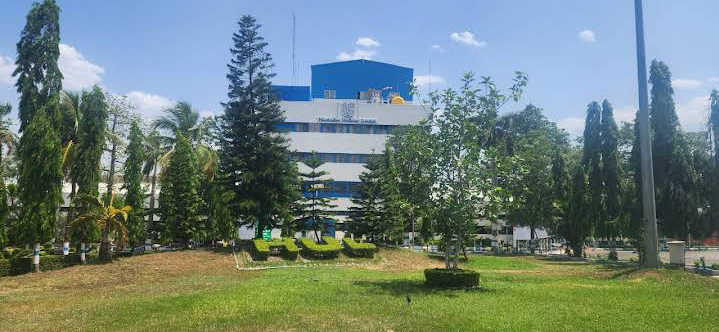
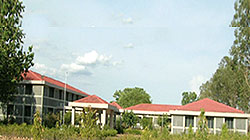
- Badalbhoi Museum Deogarh Fort, Chhindwara Highways in Chhindwara HUL Chhindwara Centre for Forestry Research and Human Resource Development (CFRHRD)Chhindwara

- Location in the state of Madhya Pradesh, India Chhindwara (India)
- Coordinates: 22.07°N 78.93°E
- Country: India
- State: Madhya Pradesh
- District: Chhindwara

Government
  - Type: Mayor–Council
  - Body: Chhindwara Municipal Corporation
  - MLA: Kamal Nath (INC)
  - MP: Vivek Bunty Sahu
  - Mayor: Vikram Ahakey

Area
  - Total: 110 km^{2} (42 sq mi)
- Elevation: 675 m (2,215 ft)

Population (2025)
  - Total: 6.5 lakh current population

Languages
  - Official: Hindi, Urdu and Gondi Language
- Time zone: UTC+5:30 (IST)
- PIN: 480001,480002,480003
- Telephone code: 07162
- Vehicle registration: MP-28
- Sex ratio: .966 ♂/♀
- Avg. high temperature: 32.7 °C (90.9 °F)
- Avg. low temperature: 18.0 °C (64.4 °F)
- Website: chhindwaranagarnigam.com chhindwara.nic.in

Chhindwara is a city and Municipal Corporation in Chhindwara district in the Indian state of Madhya Pradesh. The city is the administrative headquarters of Chhindwara District. Chhindwara is reachable by rail or road from adjacent cities Betul, Jabalpur and Nagpur. The nearest airport is in Nagpur, although there is a small airport located in the district which is not serviceable for passenger planes.

== History ==
It was believed that Chhindwara District was full of chhind trees (wild date palms) many years ago, and the place was called "chhind-wada" (wada means place). Another story says that due to the population of lions (called "sinh" in Hindi), it was considered equivalent to entering the lions' den to enter this district. Hence, it was called "Sinh Dwara" (lit. 'Lion Gate'). Over time, it became "Chhindwara".

The Gole Gunj market of the city, with its two large gateways (known today as Kamania Gate), was built by Captain Montgomery, who administrated the district as a regent of Richard Jenkins (1818–1830). The municipality of Chhindwara was founded in 1867.

== Geography ==
Chhindwara is one of the largest cities in the Satpura range. It is on a plateau, surrounded by lush green fields, rivers and by dense forest with diverse flora and fauna. The town is built around the Bodri Stream, a tributary of the Kulbehra River and the origin source of Pench River which flows across Pench National Park.

=== Climate ===
Climate data for Chhindwara (1991–2020, extremes 1908–2020)
Month	Jan	Feb	Mar	Apr	May	Jun	Jul	Aug	Sep	Oct	Nov	Dec	Year
Record high °C (°F)	36.0 (96.8)	37.0 (98.6)	41.0 (105.8)	43.0 (109.4)	47.6 (117.7)	45.5 (113.9)	40.3 (104.5)	34.0 (93.2)	38.6 (101.5)	38.0 (100.4)	35.5 (95.9)	33.4 (92.1)	47.6 (117.7)
Mean daily maximum °C (°F)	24.4 (75.9)	26.9 (80.4)	31.8 (89.2)	36.7 (98.1)	39.2 (102.6)	34.7 (94.5)	29.1 (84.4)	27.6 (81.7)	28.8 (83.8)	29.5 (85.1)	27.0 (80.6)	25.5 (77.9)	30.0 (86.0)
Mean daily minimum °C (°F)	9.2 (48.6)	12.1 (53.8)	16.0 (60.8)	20.9 (69.6)	24.4 (75.9)	23.3 (73.9)	22.4 (72.3)	22.0 (71.6)	21.5 (70.7)	17.8 (64.0)	12.9 (55.2)	9.2 (48.6)	17.5 (63.5)
Record low °C (°F)	1.6 (34.9)	2.8 (37.0)	7.0 (44.6)	9.6 (49.3)	14.6 (58.3)	10.0 (50.0)	9.3 (48.7)	9.6 (49.3)	6.5 (43.7)	2.8 (37.0)	2.1 (35.8)	1.1 (34.0)	1.1 (34.0)
Average rainfall mm (inches)	8.6 (0.34)	17.2 (0.68)	18.3 (0.72)	10.1 (0.40)	11.2 (0.44)	144.1 (5.67)	272.9 (10.74)	245.0 (9.65)	185.0 (7.28)	49.7 (1.96)	20.6 (0.81)	3.8 (0.15)	986.6 (38.84)
Average rainy days	1.1	1.5	1.0	1.1	1.0	8.2	14.4	13.4	8.9	3.4	1.3	0.1	55.4
Average relative humidity (%) (at 17:30 IST)	44	43	38	31	32	52	69	75	71	60	50	43	51
Source: India Meteorological Department

== Demographics ==
As per 2011 census, Chhindwara urban agglomeration had a population of 190,008, out of which 97,040 were males and 92,968 were females. The literacy rate was 89.25 per cent with male literacy being 93.77% and female literacy being 84.54%. Chhindwara urban agglomeration included Chhindwara (M), Khajari (OG), Khapabhat (OG), Kukadajagat (OG), Chandangaon (OG), Seoni Pranmoti (OG), Emaliya Bohata (OG) and Lonia Karbal (CT).

Religion in City of Chhindwara (2011)
1. Hinduism (81.0%)
2. Islam (13.0%)
3. Jainism (3.40%)
4. Christianity (1.60%)
5. Other or Not stated (1.00%)

== Economy ==
Chhindwara is home to brands like Raymond's, Adani Wilmar, Western Coalfields Limited and Hindustan Unilever. The city has rich market areas such as Mansarover Complex, Fawwara Chowk, Nagpur Road, Gole Gunj & Gandhi Gunj. Kamal Nath is often named the person who oversaw Chhindwaras economic growth. During his term as MP's 18th Chief Minister, he commissioned large scale infrastructure projects such as the Chhindwara ring road, many dams, and created a high standard for road construction under his "Chhindwara model" which his government sought to replicate in other cities of the state.

=== Industries ===
Coal mines near the town are run by Western Coalfields Limited. The city is home to old industries of pottery, leather moots and ornaments of zinc, brass and bell metal. On the outskirts, vegetables, especially potatoes, are raised in large quantities for export to nearby districts. The town, which is a center for local trade and a market for the sale of cattle, grain and timber, also contains a grain market near the railway station. Following are some recognizable industries that have contributed to the industrial development of Chhindwara:

- Hindustan Unilever is a multinational company, originally from England. Formerly named Hindustan Lever Limited, Hindustan Unilever Limited is situated in Lahgadua, 5 km from Chhindwara. The Chhindwara factory, home to about 210 workers, produces three main products: Rin washing soap, Wheel washing powder and Surf Excel washing powder. It is the only factory of Hindustan Unilever in Madhya Pradesh. In 2007 the production was 70,000 units.
- Raymond Group: The Raymond Chhindwara plant, set up in 1991, is a state-of-the-art integrated manufacturing facility located 65 km from Chhindwara. Built on 100 acres (0.40 km^{2}) of land, the plant produces premium pure wool, wool blended and polyester viscose suiting.
- Western Coalfields Limited is the major company of Chhindwara; approximately ten thousand people work for the company.

=== CII at Chhindwara ===
The Confederation of Indian Industry (CII) started its operation in August 2007 at Chhindwara with the opening of a secretariat at Madhuvan Colony. Initially, CII worked largely upon small agricultural conferences, as the district is predominantly agrarian. In September 2008 CII inaugurated the National Center of Excellence for Skill Development, the first of its kind, catering to the need of skilled workforce for the Indian industry.

Initially, Ambuja Cement and L&T ECC division started trades of masonry and bar bending respectively but had to wind up as the trades were not very well taken by the masses. However, Ambuja Cement has recently started a training center at Amarwara and L&T ECC is constantly picking up youth from the rural areas for training at their well-established centers at Chennai and Hyderabad. In the near future, the center will move to its own campus at Imlikhera where it will operate out of a 10 acres (40,000 m^{2}) of premises with 20 acres (81,000 m^{2}) extra completely devoted for driving. Companies such as CAT, Cummins, Mahindra & Mahindra and GMR Group will start their training here. The center is run by Kamal Nath.

== Places of interest ==
- Deogarh Fort: This historical fort is 24 miles (39 km) south of Chhindwara beyond Mohkhed. It is built on a hill which is fortified by a deep valley clothed with dense reserve forest. The fort is approachable up to its foot by motor road. Deogarh Fort was built by King Jatav of Gond. It was the capital of Gondwana dynasty until the 18th century. The architecture is somewhat similar to that of the Mughals.
- The Tribal Museum opened in Chhindwara on 20 April 1954 and acquired 'State Museum' status in 1975. On 8 September 1997 the Tribal Museum's name was changed to "Shri Badal Bhoi State Tribal Museum". The museum is maintained by a museum in-charge Officer with the help of artists and peons. It comprises 14 rooms, 3 galleries and two open galleries. It depicts the tribal cultures of 45 (approx.) tribal communities living in Madhya Pradesh and Chhattisgarh states. It is the oldest and the biggest tribal museum in Madhya Pradesh. It stores antique and rare collections of items related to the tribal living in the district. One can find items related to the houses, clothes, ornaments, arms, agriculture tools, art, music, dance, celebrations, the deities worshiped by them, religious activities, herbal collections, and so on.
- Sahaja Yoga Thousands of followers of Sahaja Yoga come every year to Chhindwara to visit the birthplace of Nirmala Srivastava, founder of Sahaja Yoga. She was born on 21 March 1923 to a Christian family in Chhindwara, India.
- Kali Bari Chhindwara: Kali Bari Chhindwara is a temple dedicated to Goddess Kali and the center of Bengali culture in Chhindwara. Established in 1995, the temple hasunique architecture that resembles the famous Dakshineswar Kali Temple near Kolkata. Devotees from all of religions and castes come for worship at the temple.
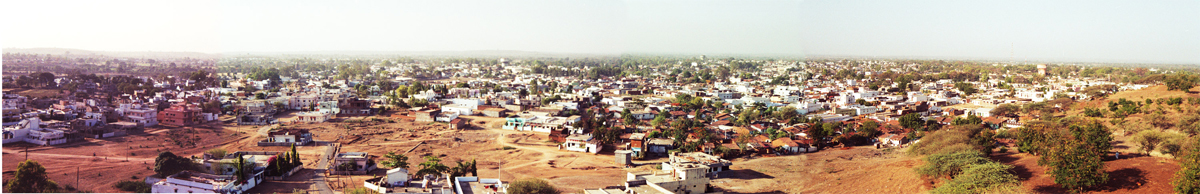
City of Chhindwara.

== Culture ==
Chhindwara District has a majority of tribal population. The tribal communities include the Gond, Pardhan, Bharia, Korku Hindi, Gondi, Urdu, Korku, and Musai. The majority of the tribal people speak in Gondi and Hindi mixed with Marathi.

== Education ==
=== Schools ===
Chhindwara has more than 300 state-sponsored schools, which are affiliated to the Madhya Pradesh Board of Secondary Education (MPBSE). In addition, there are two Kendriya Vidyalayas in the city, affiliated to the Central Board of Secondary Education (CBSE). The city is also served by numerous other private schools affiliated to either CBSE, ICSE, MPBSE.

=== Higher education ===
Chhindwara is relatively developed from its neighboring districts in terms of education and there are opportunities available for students in almost all disciplines.

- Raja Shankar Shah University

Raja Shankar Shah University, formerly known as Chhindwara University, is a state university in Chhindwara. It is the only state university in the Satpura region and provides degrees to most non-technical colleges in and around Chhindwara. Funded by the state government, the university has a residential campus and serves as an affiliating university for colleges of four other districts. The institution affiliates the colleges of Chhindwara district and other neighbouring districts like Betul, Seoni and Balaghat. It was established in May 2019 by the state government.

- G. H. Raisoni University

G.H. Raisoni University is a private university located in the village Dhoda Borgaon in Chhindwara district. The university was established in 2016 by the GHR Sons Educational and Medical Research Foundation through Madhya Pradesh Niji Vishwavidyalaya (Sthapana Ewam Sanchalan) Sanshodhan Adhyadesh, 2016, an Ordinance which also established Symbiosis University of Applied Sciences and the yet to be operational (as of April 2018) D.C. University. It is part of the Raisoni Group of Institutions (RGI).

== Transportation ==
Chhindwara is connected to its neighboring districts by rail and road both. The nearest airport is Nagpur Airport (130 km). A small airport is located in Chhindwara which is not serviceable for big passenger planes and can only serve small private aircraft. Chhindwara is connected to nearby big cities like Nagpur, Jabalpur and Bhopal with frequent buses and taxi services round the clock.

=== Road ===
National Highway 547 is a National Highway in central India passes through Chhindwara. It connects Saoner in Maharashtra to Narsinghpur in Madhya Pradesh.

National Highway 347 also passes through the city. It connects Multai and Seoni.

=== Railways ===
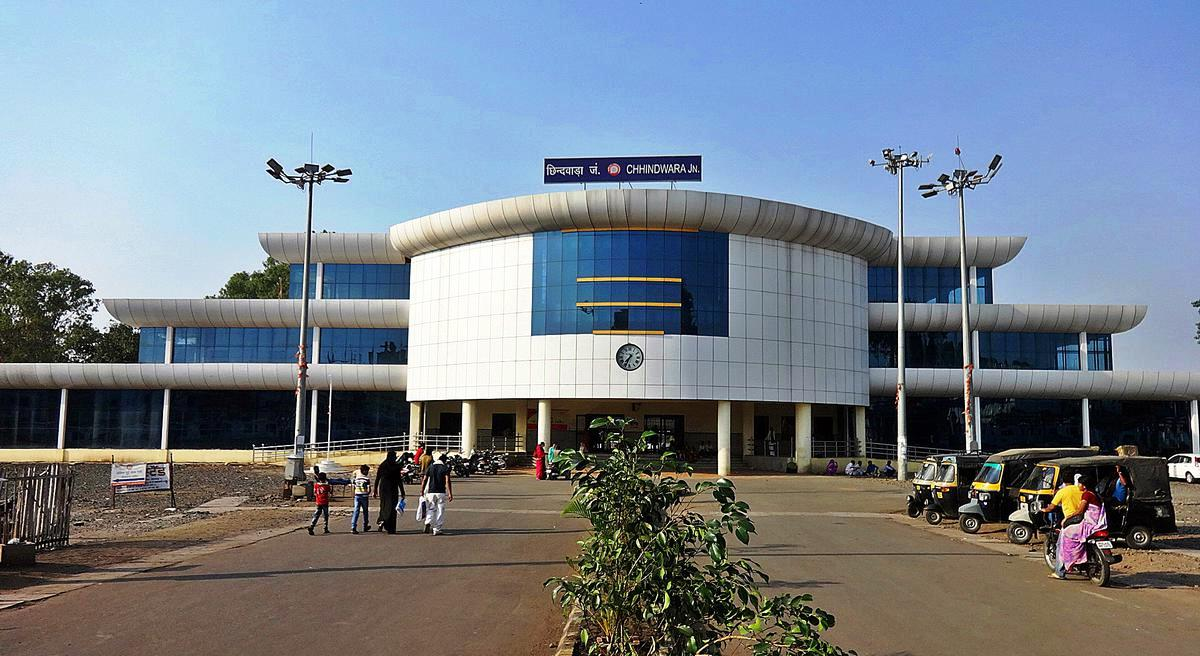
chhindwara station

Chhindwara railway station is part of the Satpura Railway and is shown on the Bilaspur-Nagpur section of Howrah-Nagpur-Mumbai line. It has the following trains running daily:

- Panchvalley Express between Chhindwara and Indore Junction via Betul - Bhopal - Dewas
- Patalkot Express between Seoni and Ferozpur via Bhopal - Bina - Mathura
- Amla Memu between Chhindwara and Amla
- Betul Passenger between Chhindwara and Betul
- Nagpur Passenger between Chhindwara and Itwari

== Notable people ==
- Kamal Nath, 18th Chief Minister of Madhya Pradesh
- Pearl V Puri, Television actor
- Nirmala Srivastava, Religious leader
- Nakul Nath, Indian politician Member of Parliament from Chhindwara
- Anusuiya Uikey, Indian politician, Governor of Chhattisgarh
- Bhawna Dehariya, International Mountaineer
- Pakhi Tyrewala, Indian writer and film director

== Radio & Broadcasting Service ==
- Radio Chhindwara-City Radio, City Local Radio.

| website = radiochhindwara.live, radiochhindwara.live
