= Athner =

Town in Madhya Pradesh, India

- Town
- Location within Madhya Pradesh Location within India
- Coordinates: 21.62°N 77.92°E
- Country: India
- State: Madhya Pradesh
- District: Betul
- Region: Narmadapur Division
- Ward: 15 wards

Government
  - Type: Nagar panchayat

Population (2024)
  - Total: 25,915
  - Density: 3,192/km^{2} (8,270/sq mi)

Languages
  - Official: Hindi
- Time zone: UTC+5:30 (IST)
- PIN: 460110
- Vehicle registration: MP 48
- Literacy rate (2011): 85.64%

Athner is a nagar parishad located in Betul District of Madhya Pradesh, India.

== Boundaries ==
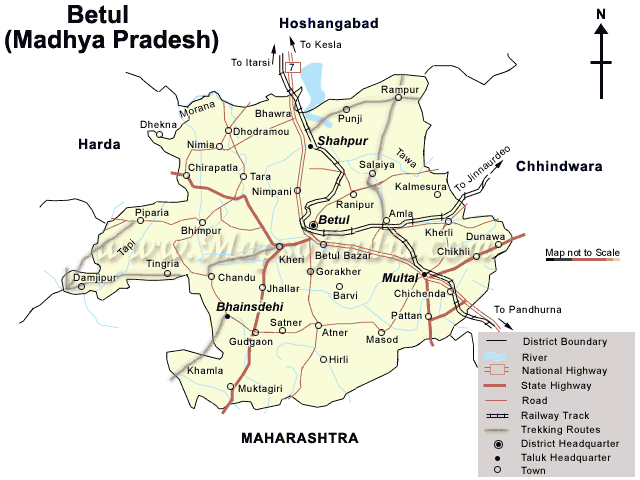
Betul district map

Betul (35 km), Multai (48 km), Bhainsdehi (32 km), and Amla (57 km), are the closest cities to Athner.

Khapa (6 km), Gunkhed (3 km), Dhamori (3 km), Gujarmal (4 km), and Yenkheda (5 km) are the nearby villages to athner.

Athner is surrounded by Prabhat Pattan Tehsil to the east, Bhinsdhi Tehsil to the west, Betul Tehsil the to the north, and Amravati Tehsil to the south.

== Demographics ==
Athner had a population of 25,915, of whom 12,991 were male and 12,924 were female, per the 2011 census.

Religion in Athner town (2011)
Religion	Percent
Hinduism	82.22%
Islam	17.00%
Jainism	0.46%
Christianity	0.01%
Buddhism	0.09%
Others†	0.16%

== Transport ==
=== Roadways ===
Athner is located on the Multai – Benshdhi state Highway. It is well connected by road, being connected to Betul, Multai, Amla, and Bhainsdehi. A daily bus service is available.

=== Railways ===
The nearest railway station is Betul railway station, which is 35 km from Athner.

=== Airways ===
The nearest airport is Raja Bhoj Airport Bhopal, which is 214 km from Harda, and Devi Ahilya Bai Holkar Airport Indore, which is 306 km from Athner.

== Climate ==
Climate data for Athner, Madhya Pradesh (1981–2010, extremes 1948–2012)
Month	Jan	Feb	Mar	Apr	May	Jun	Jul	Aug	Sep	Oct	Nov	Dec	Year
Record high °C (°F)	34.9 (94.8)	37.8 (100.0)	42.3 (108.1)	43.7 (110.7)	48.0 (118.4)	44.5 (112.1)	38.6 (101.5)	33.6 (92.5)	35.5 (95.9)	36.8 (98.2)	35.0 (95.0)	32.7 (90.9)	48.0 (118.4)
Mean daily maximum °C (°F)	27.4 (81.3)	30.1 (86.2)	34.6 (94.3)	38.7 (101.7)	40.3 (104.5)	35.7 (96.3)	29.2 (84.6)	27.6 (81.7)	29.8 (85.6)	31.1 (88.0)	29.1 (84.4)	27.8 (82.0)	31.8 (89.2)
Daily mean °C (°F)	18.9 (66.0)	21.0 (69.8)	25.3 (77.5)	29.7 (85.5)	32.5 (90.5)	30.0 (86.0)	25.8 (78.4)	24.7 (76.5)	25.4 (77.7)	24.2 (75.6)	21.2 (70.2)	19.0 (66.2)	24.8 (76.7)
Mean daily minimum °C (°F)	10.5 (50.9)	11.9 (53.4)	16.1 (61.0)	20.6 (69.1)	24.7 (76.5)	24.4 (75.9)	22.5 (72.5)	21.8 (71.2)	21.1 (70.0)	17.3 (63.1)	13.4 (56.1)	10.2 (50.4)	17.9 (64.2)
Record low °C (°F)	−0.2 (31.6)	1.1 (34.0)	2.3 (36.1)	10.6 (51.1)	16.6 (61.9)	14.9 (58.8)	14.5 (58.1)	13.1 (55.6)	10.5 (50.9)	5.0 (41.0)	2.6 (36.7)	1.3 (34.3)	−0.2 (31.6)
Average rainfall mm (inches)	13.8 (0.54)	14.2 (0.56)	19.7 (0.78)	6.9 (0.27)	13.3 (0.52)	144.5 (5.69)	330.1 (13.00)	371.7 (14.63)	189.8 (7.47)	57.8 (2.28)	20.6 (0.81)	8.6 (0.34)	1,191 (46.89)
Average rainy days	1.1	1.5	1.4	0.7	0.9	8.0	15.2	15.5	8.8	3.2	1.7	0.8	58.7
Average relative humidity (%) (at 17:30 IST)	44	34	25	20	24	53	77	84	74	60	52	47	50
Source: India Meteorological Department

== Geography ==
Athner is located at 21.62°N 77.92°E, within the Satpura Range in the southern part of the district. It has an average elevation of 741 metres (2,431 ft).

== Economy ==
Its people depend on farming and business. Wheat, maize and soybeans are the main crops.

== Administration ==
Athner is a tehsil headquarter in Betul District, containing 98 villages.

It is divided into 15 wards for which elections are held every five years.

It is divided into eight subdivisions:

- Vikas Nagar
- Bhagwati Nagar
- Gunwant Nagar
- Gayatri Nagar
- Azad Nagar
- Shanti Nagar
- Patal Maholla
- Hanuman Maholla
