= Sunilam =

Indian politician

Dr Sunilam
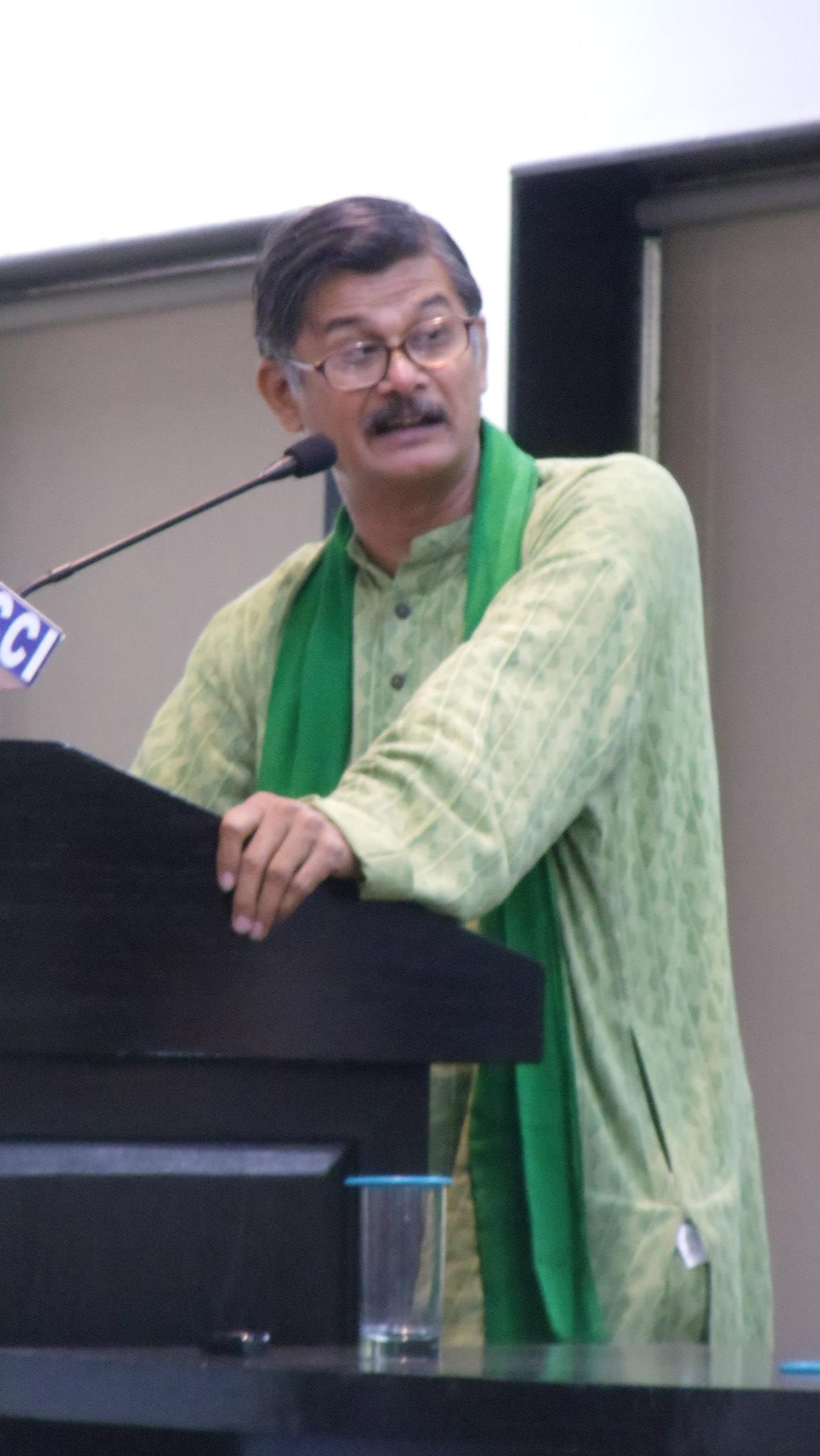
- Sunilam in September 2012

Member of Madhya Pradesh Legislative Assembly
- In office 1998–2008
- Preceded by: P. R. Bodkhe
- Succeeded by: Meera Uikey
- Constituency: Multai

Personal details
- Born: Sunil Mishra; 27 July 1961 (age 65) Sultaniya Hospital, Bhopal
- Party: Samajwadi Party
- Spouse: Vandana Mishra
- Education: Delhi University
- Occupation: Social activist

Sunilam (born 27 July 1961), formerly known as Sunil Mishra, is an Indian socialist politician, writer, and former physicist. In the mid-1990s he was the national general secretary of the Yuva Janata Dal.

== Politics ==
He took part in founding the Socialist Front in the early 2000s. As of 2008, he served as the national secretary of the Samajwadi Party. He holds a doctorate and was an activist of the Hind Mazdoor Kisan Panchayat. He is also the president of the Madhya Pradesh Kisan Sangarsh Samiti (MPKSS, 'Peasant Struggle Association'), based in Multai. As a politician, he was reportedly non-corrupt.

In 2006 Sunilam formed part of a seven-member delegation, led by Sitaram Yechury, that visited Nepal to show support for the pro-democracy movement there.

In 2004 Sunilam finished third in the contest for the Betul Lok Sabha seat, obtaining 74,391 votes. At the time of the election, he had 41 criminal cases registered against him. In 2008 he contested a by-election for the same seat, but lost his deposit.

== Early life ==
Sunil Mishra was born on 27 July 1961, at Govt. Sultaniya Hospital in Bhopal, India.

He graduated from Govt. Science College, Gwalior and completed his post-graduate Msc Applied Physics from M.I.T.S., Gwalior's engineering college. Sunilam received a PhD in Bio-Medical Electronics from Delhi University.

Being the founder President of Kisan Sangharsh Samiti (Farmers Struggle Committee), he offered his leadership for Kisan Andolans. He was sent to prison for three months, after his arrest in Kisan Andolan at Multai, M.P, where 24 innocent farmers/kisans were shot dead and 250 injured under police firing on 12 January 1998 (1998 Multai Farmers Massacre).
