= Bhimpur =

Town in Madhya Pradesh

- Town
- Location in Madhya Pradesh, India
- Coordinates: 21.67°N 77.68°E
- Country: India
- State: Madhya Pradesh
- District: Betul

Bhimpur is a town and a Tehsil Headquarter in Betul District of Madhya Pradesh. It is a tribal majority area, and part of Narmadapuram Division.

== Geography ==
It is located in the southern part of Madhya Pradesh, at coordinates: 21.65°N 77.63°E. Nearby towns are Betul and Bhainsdehi.

== Population ==
According to the Census of India 2011, Bhimpur had a population of 4,126, of which 2,000 were males and 2,126 were females. The male literacy rate was 75.98% and the female literacy rate was 68.37%.

== Economy ==
Its people depend on farming, forestry and business. Wheat, maize and soybeans are the main crops. Its Pin Code is 460330.

== Transport ==
Bhimpur is well connected with State Highway 26 road ways, It is connected to nearby major cities with daily bus services. Major cities near to Bhimpur:

- Betul, 48 km
- Bhainsdehi, 48 km
- Chicholi, 21 km

== See also ==
- Bhainsdehi
- Betul District
