= Betul =

Betul may refer to:

== Places ==
- Betul district, Madhya Pradesh, India
  - Betul, Madhya Pradesh, the administrative head-quarter of the district
    - Betul railway station
  - Betul (Lok Sabha constituency)
  - Betul (Vidhan Sabha constituency)
- Betul, Goa, India

== People ==
- Betul Haile Maryam (1812–1853), Semien noble in the Ethiopian Empire
- Betül, a Turkish given name for women

== See also ==
- Sal River (India), sometimes erroneously referred to as the Betul River because it empties into the Arabian Sea at Betul, Goa
