= Multai Assembly constituency =

Constituency of the Madhya Pradesh legislative assembly in India

Coordinates: 21.78°N 78.27°E

Multai
- Constituency No. 129 for the Madhya Pradesh Legislative Assembly

Constituency details
- Country: India
- Region: Central India
- State: Madhya Pradesh
- District: Betul
- Lok Sabha constituency: Betul
- Established: 1972
- Reservation: None

Member of Legislative Assembly
- 16th Madhya Pradesh Legislative Assembly
- Incumbent Chandrashekhar Deshmukh
- Party: Bharatiya Janata Party
- Elected year: 2023
- Preceded by: Sukhdev Panse

Multai is one of the 230 Vidhan Sabha (Legislative Assembly) constituencies of Madhya Pradesh state in central India. It is part of Betul district. As of 2023, its representative is Chandrashekhar Deshmukh of the Bharatiya Janata Party.

== Members of the Legislative Assembly ==
Election	Name	Party
1952	Biharilal Patel	Indian National Congress
1957	Anandrao Sonaji	Independent politician
1962	Balkrishna	Indian National Congress
1967	B. R. Deorao	Indian National Congress
1972	Radhakrishna Garg Vakeel	Independent politician
1977	Maniram Barange	Independent politician
1980	Maniram Barange	Independent politician
1985	Ashok Kadwe	Indian National Congress
1990	Maniram Barange	Bharatiya Janata Party
1993	P. R. Bodkhe	Independent politician
1998	Sunilram	Independent politician
2003	Sunilram	Samajwadi Party
2008	Sukhdev Panse	Indian National Congress
2013	Chandrashekhar Deshmukh	Bharatiya Janata Party
2018	Sukhdev Panse	Indian National Congress
2023	Chandrashekhar Deshmukh	Bharatiya Janata Party

== Election results ==
=== 2023 ===
2023 Madhya Pradesh Legislative Assembly election: Multai
Party	Candidate	Votes	%	±%
BJP	Chandrashekhar Deshmukh	96,066	51.38	+10.1
INC	Sukhdeo Panse	81,224	43.44	−7.87
BSP	Indalrao Khatarkar	2,257	1.21	−0.32
NOTA	None of the above	1,488	0.8	−0.31
Majority		14,842	7.94	−2.09
Turnout		186,964	81.02	+0.3
BJP gain from INC		Swing		

=== 2018 ===
2018 Madhya Pradesh Legislative Assembly election: Multai
Party	Candidate	Votes	%	±%
INC	Sukhdev Panse	88,219	51.31	
BJP	Raja Pawar	70,969	41.28	
BSP	Jagdish Sahu	2,636	1.53	
Independent	Sanju Salam	1,746	1.02	
GGP	Kishor Chourasiya	1,578	0.92	
SP	Jagdish Dodke	1,539	0.9	
NOTA	None of the above	1,916	1.11	
Majority		17,250	10.03	
Turnout		171,918	80.72	
INC hold		Swing		

== See also ==
- Multai
