= Ghodadongari tehsil =

Ghodadongari
- Tehsil
- Location in Madhya Pradesh Ghodadongari (India)
- Coordinates: 22.124017°N 77.999559°E
- Country: India
- State: Madhya Pradesh
- District: Betul district

Government
  - Type: Janpad Panchayat
  - Body: Council

Area
  - Total: 758.49 km^{2} (292.85 sq mi)

Population (2011)
  - Total: 235,790

Languages
  - Official: Hindi
- Time zone: UTC+5:30 (IST)
- Postal code (PIN): 460443
- Area code: 07146
- ISO 3166 code: MP-IN
- Vehicle registration: MP 48
- No. of Villages: 172
- Sex ratio: 968

Ghodadongari tehsil is a fourth-order administrative and revenue division, a subdivision of third-order administrative and revenue division of Betul district of Madhya Pradesh.

== Geography ==
Ghodadongari tehsil has an area of 758.49 sq kilometers. It is bounded by Shahpur tehsil in the west and northwest, Hoshangabad district in the north, Chhindwara district in the northeast and east, Amla tehsil in the southeast, Betul tehsil in the south and Chicholi tehsil in the southwest.

== See also ==
- Betul district
