= Machna River =

- Indian River Map

Location
- Country: India
- State: madhya Pradesh
- City: Betul, Shahpur

Physical characteristics
- Source: Satpura range
  - location: Hasalpur, Amla, Betul district
- Mouth: Tawa River
  - location: Near Shahpur, Betul District
  - coordinates: 22°13′N 77°57′E
- Length: 116 km (72 mi)

Machna River is a significant water source in the Betul district of Madhya Pradesh, India.

It flows through the Betul district, passing near Betul and Shahpur towns. it's originate Near Amla town. The total length of the Machna River is 116 kilometres (72 mi). Its tributary is the Tawa River.

Machna River's water is used primarily for drinking, irrigation, and local livestock.
