= Zero Mile Stone (Nagpur) =

Zero Mile Stone Śūnya Mailācā Dagaḍa
- Monument
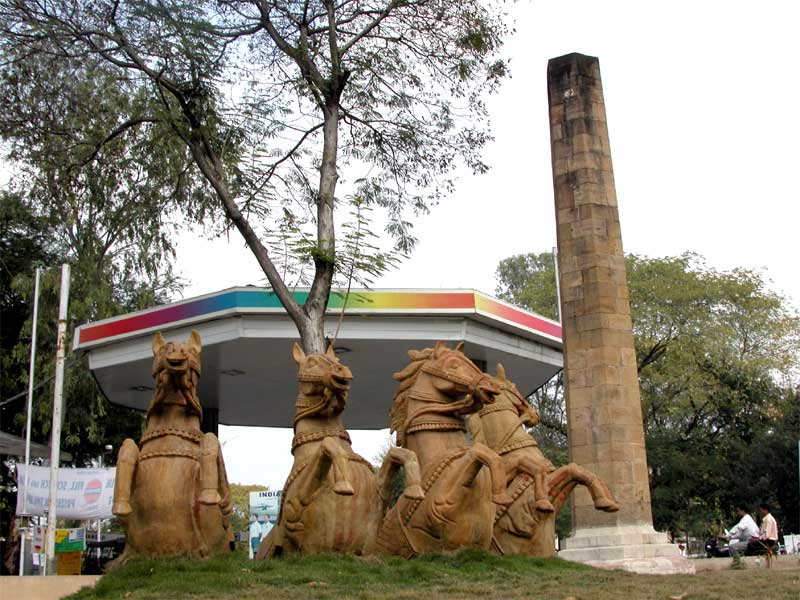
- Zero Mile Stone, Nagpur

- Location in Maharashtra, India
- Coordinates: 21.149850°N 79.080598°E
- Country: India
- State: Maharashtra
- Region: Vidarbha
- District: Nagpur
- City: Nagpur
- Great Trigonometrical Survey: 1907

Languages
  - Official: Marathi
- Time zone: UTC+5:30 (IST)

Zero Mile Stone (ISO: Śūnya Mailācā Dagaḍa) is a monument built by the British during the Great Trigonometrical Survey of India in 1907 in Nagpur, Maharashtra. The Zero Mile Stone consists of a pillar made up of sandstone and another small stone representing the GTS Standard Bench Mark, and four stucco horses that were added later. The height of the top of the pillar is 310.948 m (1,020.17 ft) above mean sea level. In 2008, The Times of India undertook to maintain the monument for the next 5 years.

The city of Nagpur lies geographically at the center of all the nine major metros of India, viz. Ahmedabad, Bangalore, Chennai, Hyderabad, Kochi, Mumbai, Kolkata, New Delhi, and Pune.

The following table gives the distances from Zero Mile in Nagpur to nearby places, which is marked on the hexagonal base of the pillar in miles.

| Place | Distance in miles | Distance in kilometres | Direction |
|---|---|---|---|
| Raipur | 174 | 280 | East |
| Hyderabad | 318 | 512 | South-East |
| Chandrapur | 125 | 201 | South-East |
| Jabalpur | 170 | 274 | North-East |
| Seoni | 79 | 127 | North-East |
| Chhindwara | 83 | 134 | North-West |
| Betul | 101 | 163 | West |

Although Nagpur's Zero Mile Stone is considered to be the geographical centre of India through the Great Trigonometrical Survey, two villages in Madhya Pradesh also claim this distinction—Karaundi and Barsali.
