= Datora =

- village
- Location in Madhya Pradesh, India
- Coordinates: 21°35′43″N 78°9′21″E
- Country: India
- State: Madhya Pradesh
- District: Betul

Government
  - Type: Sarpanch
  - Body: Divya Gyaneshwar Dhote

Datora is a village situated in the Multai Tehsil, Betul district, Madhya Pradesh, India. It holds a three-day fair every two years in the months of December–January.

There is a guest house in the village in the valley of Datora. There is a small lake beside the temple.
