= Ridhora =

- Location within India
- Country: India
- State: Madhya Pradesh
- District: Betul

Population (2002)
  - Total: 1,502

Languages
- Time zone: UTC+5:30 (IST)

Ridhora is a village panchayat in Multai block (or tehsil), Betul district, in the state of Madhya Pradesh in India.
