= Satner =

Coordinates: 21°36′N 77°48′E

Satner सतनेर
- Location within India
- Country: India
- State: Madhya Pradesh
- District: Betul

Languages
- Time zone: UTC+5:30 (IST)

Satner is a village in Athner tehsil, Betul district, India. Its population is greater than 16000. It is the second largest gram panchayat of Athner block. There is a temple situated at the center of the village which is "gadi wali maiya", whole villagers worship there, and celebrates festival of navratri.
