= MTY =

MTY or mty may refer to:

- Monterrey, a city in the Northeast state Nuevo León, Mexico.
  - Monterrey International Airport, Apodaca, Nuevo León, Mexico; by IATA airport code
- MTY Food Group, Canadian restaurant franchisor and operator
- Multai railway station, Madhya Pradesh, India; by Indian Railways station code
- Nabi language, Papua New Guinea; by ISO 639-3 language code
