= Chandrashekhar Deshmukh =

Indian politician (born 1956)

Member of 16th Madhya Pradesh Legislative Assembly
- In office 3 December 2023 – 2 December 2028
- Constituency: Multai

Member of 11th Madhya Pradesh Legislative Assembly
- In office 1998-2003

Personal details
- Born: 9 February 1956 (age 70)
- Party: Bharatiya Janata Party
- Spouse: Suhasini Deshmukh
- Children: 2
- Parent(s): Advocate Janrao alias Annasaheb Deshmukh (Father) and Smt. Shashikala Deshmukh (Mother)
- Education: Sagar University
- Profession: Farmer, Politician

Chandrashekhar Janrao Deshmukh; born 9 February 1956) is an Indian farmer, politician, and senior BJP leader.

He was a member of 16th Madhya Pradesh Legislative Assembly from Multai constituency in Betul district. He was a three time member of the legislative assembly, representing Masod constituency from 1998 to 2003 and Multai constituency from 2013 to 2018. He is known for his tenure as a M.L.A., where he developed a series of irrigation projects, village connectivity roads, bridges, schools, hospitals, and drinking water schemes across the constituency. The projects include the Parasdoh Dam and Medium Lift Micro-irrigation Project, Wardha Medium Lift Micro-irrigation Project, Multai-Bhainsdehi two-lane 83 kilometre concrete road, Prabhat Pattan and Athnair Government Hospital, Ayurvedic Tree Park Uttam Sagar, Tapti Sarovar Sever Line Multai, Central School Multai, Prabhat Pattan Tehsil and Mohi Industrial Area Multai.

The irrigation projects led him to be called "Dam Wale Baba".

== Early life ==
Chandrashekhar was born to Janrao Deshmukh, alias Annasaheb Deshmukh, and his wife Shashikala Deshmukh in Nagpur city. His father was an advocate in the Nagpur High Court. When Chandrashekhar was two, the family moved to his home village of Parsodi in Madhya Pradesh. He has a B.A. from Sagar University.

== Career ==
He started his political journey by as a member of Tilhan Utpadak Sahakari Samiti Parsodi in 1983. He served as sarpanch of Gram Panchayat Hirdi from 1988 to 1998. He served as Vice president of Zila Panchayat Betul district from 2005 to 2008.

He then joined the Bharatiya Janata Party. He served as Prabhat Pattan in Mandal Mahamantri (1994-1996) and Mandal Adhyaksha (1996-1998).

=== Member of Legislative Assembly ===
In 1998, he defeated INC Cabinet Minister Ramji Mahajan for the Masod MLA seat of Madhya Pradesh.

In 2013, he won his fourth assembly election for Multai constituency by the margin of 31,860 votes.

As a Member of Legislative Assembly, he helped with many projects such as in his constituency and raised the issue of illegal land purchases. He added goddess Maa Tapti into Madhya Pradesh Gaan and Tapti Mahotsava to the Government's event calendar.

== Personal life ==
Chandrashekhar Deshmukh is married to Suhasini Deshmukh. They have two children: Mamta and Gaurav. Gaurav has distinguished himself as a successful businessman.
