= Prabhat Pattan =

Village in Madhya Pradesh, India

- Town
- Location in Madhya Pradesh, India
- Coordinates: 21.64°N 78.27°E
- Country: India
- State: Madhya Pradesh
- District: Bettul

Prabhat Pattan is a village and a Tehsil in Betul district of Madhya Pradesh, India. Wardha River flows near Prabhat Pattan. Prabhat Pattan pin code is 460665.

== Geography ==
Prabhat Pattan is located on 21.64°N 78.27°E, located in Southern part of state 17 km away from Multai. It is surrounded with Satpura Mountain and Wardha River originate near Prabhat Pattan.

== Demographics ==
In the 2011 census, the town had a population of 7704 in 1645 families, of which 3909 were males and 3795 were females.

== Transportation ==
National Highway 347A passes through Prabhat Pattan, connecting it to:

- Pandhurna ~35 km
- Multai ~17 km
- Betul ~63 km

== See also ==
- Multai
- Betul District
