= Malajpur temple =

Malajpur Temple
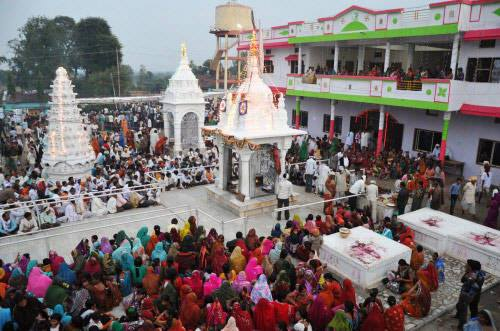

Religion
- Affiliation: Hinduism
- District: Betul
- Festival: Vasant Panchami

Location
- Location: Malajpur(Chicholi)
- State: Madhya Pradesh
- Country: India

The Malajpur Temple located in the Malajpur (region) near Chicholi in Betul, Madhya Pradesh, India. Said to be the only Ghost fair in the world, it hosts an annual fair on the occasion of Vasant Panchami. The fair is conducted on the Tombstone of Hindu Saint "Gurusahab Baba" and people comes from across the country.

== History ==
In Malajpur village of Betul, ghosts and ghosts inside the body of people allegedly talk and also give interviews. In fact, in the village of Malajpur, there is the tomb of a saint named Gurusahab Baba, where the fair of ghosts has been started continuously for the last 305 years. Here, those who are said to be possessed with ghosts are treated.

The fair at the Samadhi Sthal begins every year on the day of Magha Purnima. People who have an illusion that an evil spirit or vampire has entered their body come to this fair to get rid of them. But A Bhoot Phantom is not only seen dancing and swinging but also giving interviews.

== Timeline ==
The fair at the Samadhi Sthal begins every year on the day of Magha Purnima. People who have an illusion that an evil spirit or vampire has entered their body come to this fair to get rid of them. But A Bhoot Phantom is not only seen dancing and swinging but also giving interviews.

== Population ==
Mlajpur is a large village located in Chicholi Tehsil of Betul district, Madhya Pradesh with total 601 families residing. The Mlajpur village has population of 2765 of which 1372 are males while 1393 are females as per Population Census 2011.

In Mlajpur village population of children with age 0-6 is 406 which makes up 14.68% of total population of village. Average Sex Ratio of Mlajpur village is 1015 which is higher than Madhya Pradesh state average of 931. Child Sex Ratio for the Mlajpur as per census is 980, higher than Madhya Pradesh average of 918.

Mlajpur village has higher literacy rate compared to Madhya Pradesh. In 2011, literacy rate of Mlajpur village was 71.05% compared to 69.32% of Madhya Pradesh. In Mlajpur Male literacy stands at 83.29% while female literacy rate was 59.06%.

As per constitution of India and Panchyati Raaj Act, Mlajpur village is administrated by Sarpanch (Head of Village) who is elected representative of village. Our website, don't have information about schools and hospital in Mlajpur village.
