= Barsali railway station =

Railway station in Madhya Pradesh, India

Barsali

General information
- Location: Barsali, Betul district, Madhya Pradesh; India
- Coordinates: 21°54′35.32″N 78°1′52.90″E
- Elevation: 699 metres (2,293 ft)
- System: Indian Railways station
- Owner: Indian Railways
- Line: Bhopal–Nagpur section
- Platforms: 2
- Connections: Auto stand

Construction
- Structure type: Standard (on-ground station)
- Parking: Yes

Other information
- Status: Functioning
- Station code: BYS
- Zone(s): Central Railway
- Division(s): Nagpur CR
Location
- Location within Madhya Pradesh Location within India

Barsali railway station is a railway station in Betul district, Madhya Pradesh. Its code is BYS. It serves the village of Barsali. The station consists of two platforms.
