= Shahpur Tehsil =

Shahpur tehsil may refer to the following administrative units:

- Shahpur Tehsil, Pakistan, in Punjab, Pakistan
- Shahpur tehsil, Madhya Pradesh, in India
- Shahpur tehsil, Himachal Pradesh, in Kangra district, India
- Shahpur taluka, Karnataka, a taluka in Karnataka, India, with headquarters the city of Shahapur

== See also ==
- Shahapur taluka, in Maharashtra, India
