= Bhainsdehi tehsil =

Bhainsdehi
- Tehsil
- Location in Madhya Pradesh Bhainsdehi (India)
- Coordinates: 21.643702°N 77.631747°E
- Country: India
- State: Madhya Pradesh
- District: Betul district

Government
  - Type: Janpad Panchayat
  - Body: Council

Area
  - Total: 786.18 km^{2} (303.55 sq mi)

Population (2011)
  - Total: 289,295

Languages
  - Official: Hindi
- Time zone: UTC+5:30 (IST)
- Postal code (PIN): 460220
- Area code: 07143
- ISO 3166 code: MP-IN
- Vehicle registration: MP 48
- No. of Villages: 297
- Sex ratio: 980

Bhainsdehi tehsil is a fourth-order administrative and revenue division, a subdivision of third-order administrative and revenue division of Betul district of Madhya Pradesh.

== Geography ==
Bhainsdehi tehsil has an area of 786.18 sq kilometers. It is bounded by Harda district in the northwest and north, Chicholi tehsil in the northeast, Betul tehsil in the east, Athner tehsil in the southeast, Maharashtra in the south and southwest and Khandwa district in the west.

== See also ==
- Betul district
