= Saliwada Camp, Betul district =

Coordinates: 22.195°N 78.021°E

Saliwada
- Location within India
- Country: India
- State: Madhya Pradesh
- District: Betul

Languages
- Time zone: UTC+5:30 (IST)

Saliwada Camp a very small village in the Chopna region in the Indian state of Madhya Pradesh.

== Geography ==
Chopna is a small town located 18 km from Shahpur. The town contains 36 Bengali villages.

== Demographics ==
Template:As of the 2001 India census, Saliwada Camp had a population of 600. Males constitute 53% of the population and females 47%. Saliwada Camp has an average literacy rate of 80%, higher than the national average of 59.5%: male literacy is 85%, and female literacy is 74%. In Saliwada camp are, 11% of the population is under 6 years of age.
