= Wardha River =

River in India

Coordinates: 19°36′01″N 79°47′20″E

Wardha
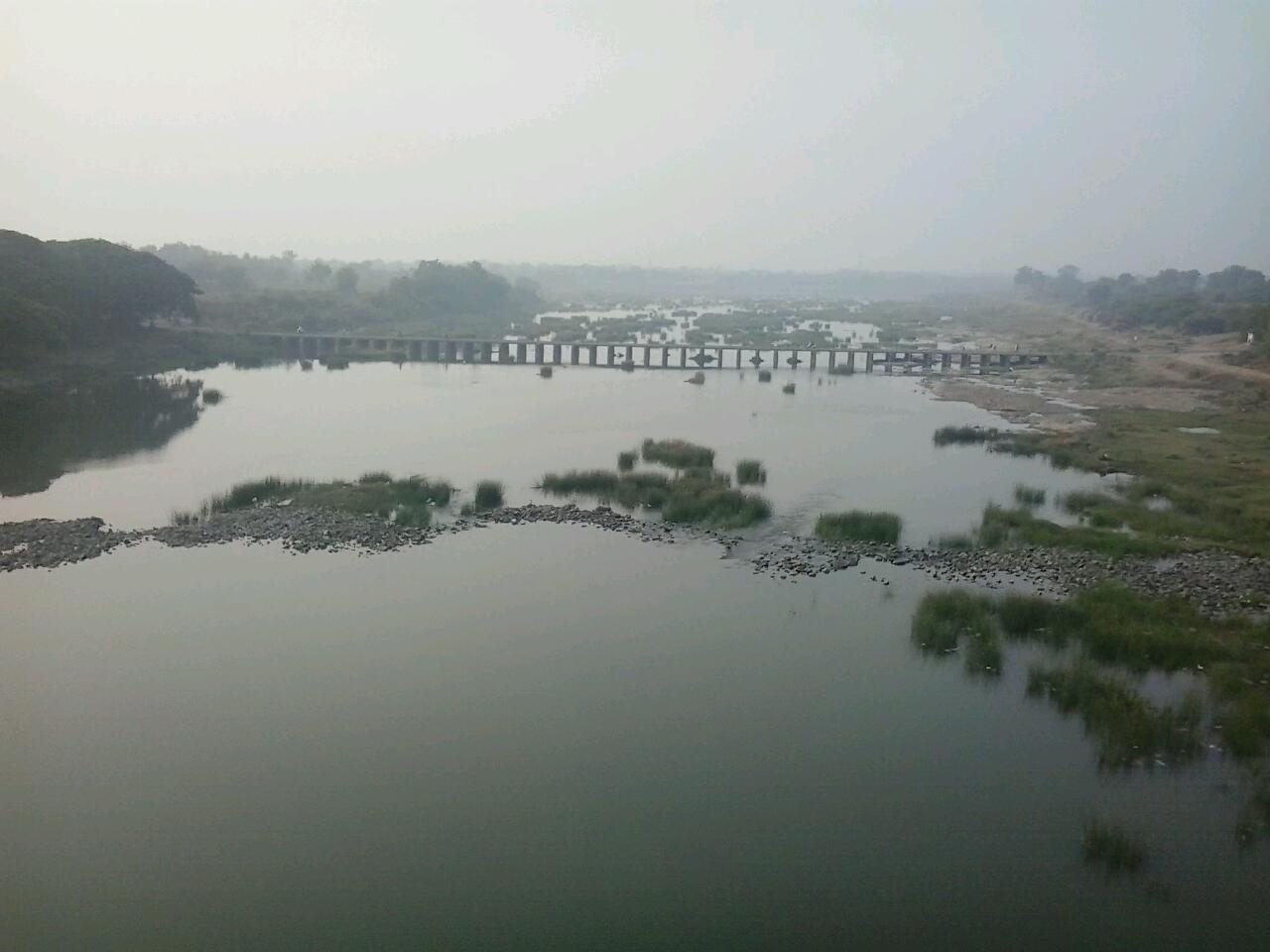
- Wardha river at Pulgaon

Location
- Country: India

Physical characteristics
- Source
  - location: Multai
- Mouth
  - location: Pranahita
- Length: 528 km (328 mi)

Basin features
- Progression: Madhya Pradesh, Maharashtra, Telangana
- Tributaries
  - left: Kar, Wena, Jam, Erai
  - right: Madu, Bembla, Penganga

The Wardha River, also known as the Varada River, is a major river in Vidarbha, Maharashtra, India, which originates in the Satpura Range and flows into the Wainganga river to form the Pranhita river which finally joins the Godavari river.

== Origin ==
The Wardha river originates at an altitude of 777 m (2,549 ft) in the Satpura Range near Khairwani village in Multai tehsil, Betul District, Madhya Pradesh.

== Course ==
From its origin, it flows for 32 km (20 mi) in Madhya Pradesh and then enters into Maharashtra. After travelling for another 528 km (328 mi), it joins the Wainganga, forming the Pranahita, which ultimately flows into the Godavari River.The river has developed extensive floodplains characterized by sweeping graceful meanders, low alluvial flats, and slip-off slopes.

== Tributaries ==
The Kar, Wena, Jam, and Erai are its left-bank tributaries, while the Madu, Bembala, and Penganga are its right-bank tributaries. The Bembla, is also an important tributary of River Wardha.

== Dams ==
The Upper Wardha Dam is located on the Wardha river near Morshi. It is considered a lifeline for the city of Amravati and the Morshi and Warud Talukas. The Lower Wardha Dam is located near Warud Bagaji and Dhanodi in Amravati District. It caters to Wardha District. A dam on the Bembala River has been constructed near Babhulgaon in Yavatmal district, and is considered a lifeline for part of Yavatmal.
