= Wena River =

Coordinates: 20°18′02″N 78°47′56″E

The Wena River or Vena is a left bank tributary of the Wardha River, in the Indian state of Maharashtra. It originates from the Mahadagad Hills in Nagpur District. The River passes by the city of Hinganghat. It joins the Wardha River near the Village of Dhiwri Pipri. Wardha River later joins the Pranhita River and ultimately ends up joining the Godavari River.
