= Amla tehsil =

Amla
- Tehsil
- Location in Madhya Pradesh Amla (India)
- Coordinates: 21.928279°N 78.130787°E
- Country: India
- State: Madhya Pradesh
- District: Betul district

Government
  - Type: Janpad Panchayat
  - Body: Council

Area
  - Total: 682.40 km^{2} (263.48 sq mi)

Population (2011)
  - Total: 176,126

Languages
  - Official: Hindi
- Time zone: UTC+5:30 (IST)
- Postal code (PIN): 460551
- Area code: 07147
- ISO 3166 code: MP-IN
- Vehicle registration: MP 48
- No. of Villages: 158
- Sex ratio: 966

Amla tehsil is a fourth-order administrative and revenue division, a subdivision of third-order administrative and revenue division of Betul district of Madhya Pradesh.

== Geography ==
Amla tehsil has an area of 682.40 sq kilometers. It is bounded by Ghodadongari tehsil in the northwest, Chhindwara district in the north, northeast and east, Multai tehsil in the southeast and south and Betul tehsil in the southwest and west.

== See also ==
- Betul district
