= Betul-Bazar =

- Town
- Location in Madhya Pradesh, India Betul-Bazar (India)
- Coordinates: 21.86°N 77.93°E
- Country: India
- State: Madhya Pradesh
- District: Betul

Population (2001)
  - Total: 9,645

Languages
  - Official: Hindi
- Time zone: UTC+5:30 (IST)
- ISO 3166 code: IN-MP
- Vehicle registration: MP

Betul-Bazar is a town and a nagar panchayat in Betul district in the state of Madhya Pradesh, India. During the rule of the Maratha Empire Betul-Bazar was the district headquarters of the current Betul district. In 1822 the district administration shifted to the current Betul town. Hence the Betul district and Betul-Bazar is rich in Marathi people and culture.

== Demographics ==
As of 2001 India census, Betul-Bazar had a population of 9,645. Males constitute 51% of the population and females 49%. Betul-Bazar has an average literacy rate of 73%, higher than the national average of 59.5%, with 56% of males and 44% of females literate. 12% of the population is under 6 years of age.

== Industries ==
Agriculture is the main source of income. Betul-bazar is known for sugarcane farming.

== Education ==
Betul-Bazar has two primary schools and two middle and two high schools. Middle and high schools are separate for boys and girls.

== Sports ==
"Diamond Trophy," the cricket tournament, is conducted each year in December and January on the grounds of the Government Agriculture school. Most of the professional cricket teams of the district take part in this tournament.
