= Athner tehsil =

Athner
- Tehsil
- Location in Madhya Pradesh Athner (India)
- Coordinates: 21.624919°N 77.913889°E
- Country: India
- State: Madhya Pradesh
- District: Betul district

Government
  - Type: Janpad Panchayat
  - Body: Council

Area
  - Total: 699.64 km^{2} (270.13 sq mi)

Population (2011)
  - Total: 106,793

Languages
  - Official: Hindi
- Time zone: UTC+5:30 (IST)
- Postal code (PIN): 460110
- Area code: 07144
- ISO 3166 code: MP-IN
- Vehicle registration: MP 48
- No. of Villages: 101
- Sex ratio: 967

Athner tehsil is a fourth-order administrative and revenue division, a subdivision of third-order administrative and revenue division of Betul district of Madhya Pradesh.

== Geography ==
Athner tehsil has an area of 699.64 sq kilometers. It is bounded by Bhainsdehi tehsil in the southwest, west and northwest, Betul tehsil in the north, Multai tehsil in the northeast and east and Maharashtra in the southeast and south.

== See also ==
- Betul district
