= Muktagiri =

Jain pilgrimage centre in Madhya Pradesh

Muktagiri Tirtha
- Mendhagiri( मुक्तागिरी), Muktagiri Siddha Kshetra
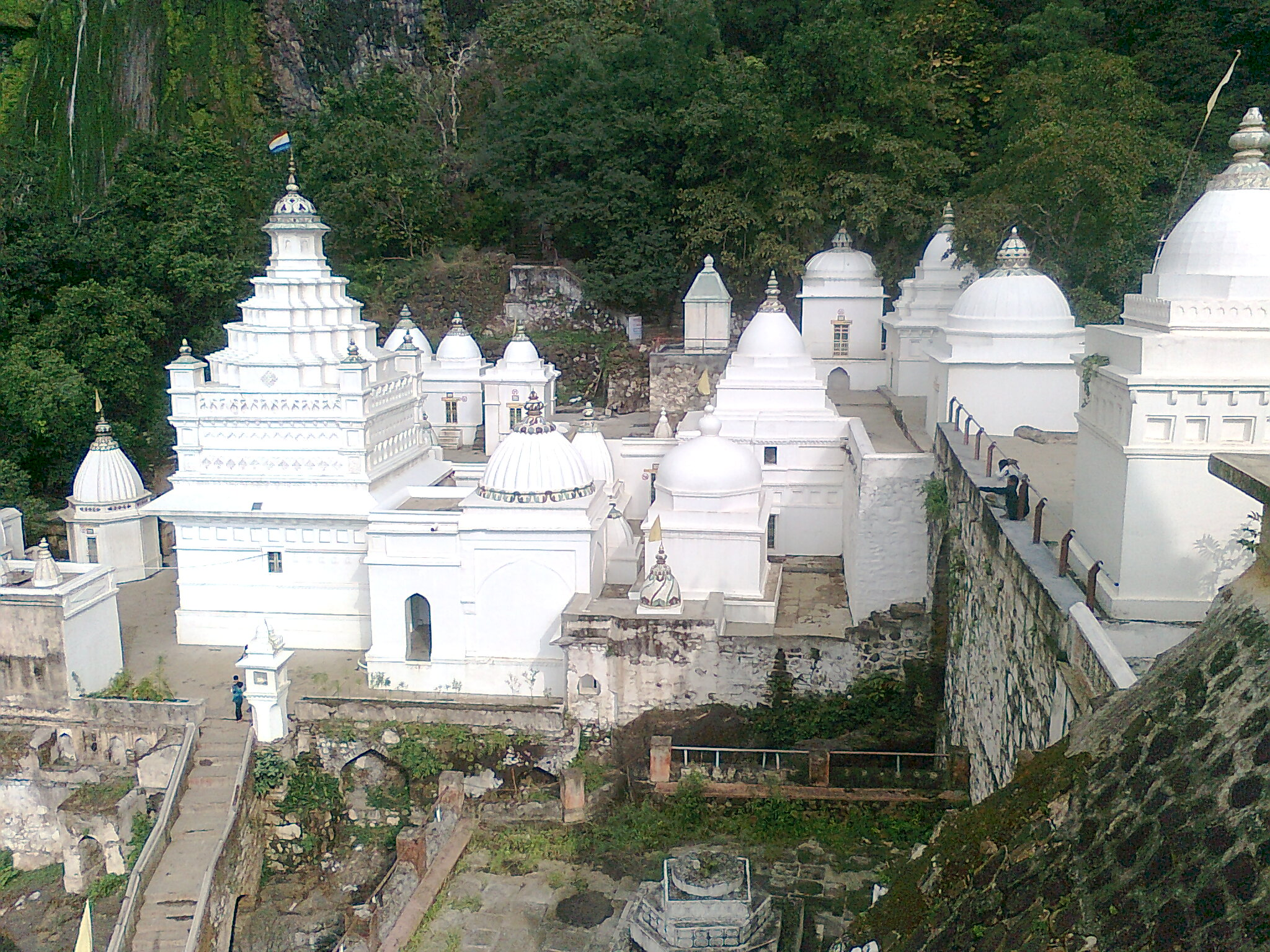
- Muktagiri Digambar Jain temples Betul

- Location within Madhya Pradesh

Religion
- Affiliation: Jainism
- Festival: Mahavir Jayanti

Location
- Location: Betul, Madhya Pradesh, India
- Interactive map of Muktagiri Tirtha
- Coordinates: 21°23′2″N 77°35′47″E

Architecture
- Established: 10th Century
- Temple: 52

Website
- https://www.muktagiri.org/

Muktagiri or Mendhagiri, is a Jain pilgrimage centre, located on border of Madhya Pradesh and Maharashtra in India. It comes under Bhainsdehi tehsil of Betul district and is 14 km (14,000 m) from Paratwada in Amravati district.

== Jain temple ==
It is believed that every person who visits this tirth will achieve nirvana, regardless of their faith. According to Jain legends, it rains saffron and sandalwood in every eighth century. For reaching the temple complex one has to take 600 stairs. It is surrounded by a waterfall and several Jain temples built in modern architecture with each temple features a dome. Like Kundalpur, Girnar Jain temples, Dilwara temples and Shikharji, the Muktagiri temple complex is known for its rich architecture.

Muktagiri Siddha Kshetra Jain tirth constitutes 52 Jain temples, the oldest one of which is a cave. These temples were built during 13th-14th century. The arched entrance to the cave temple has carvings of lotus with small images of tirthankar carved on each side of gate, with an image of Mahavir Swami in lotus position installed in the middle of entrance gate. It comprises a square garbhagriha with mandapa having carvings of leaves. Mandapa is a circular structure based on two pillars and four kudya stambhas. On mandapa's wall images of tirthankaras has been carved. The cave consist of around 56 images of tirthankars.

The seven hooded idol of Parshvanath in 26th temple is considered excellent example of craftsmanship. The main temples are the first, tenth (the cave), 26th and 40th. Temple also has a dharamshala equipped with all modern facilities and Bhojanalays. Muktagiri fair is organised on occasion of Diwali.

== Restoration ==
Muktagiri is protected by the Archaeological Survey of India.

== Gallery ==
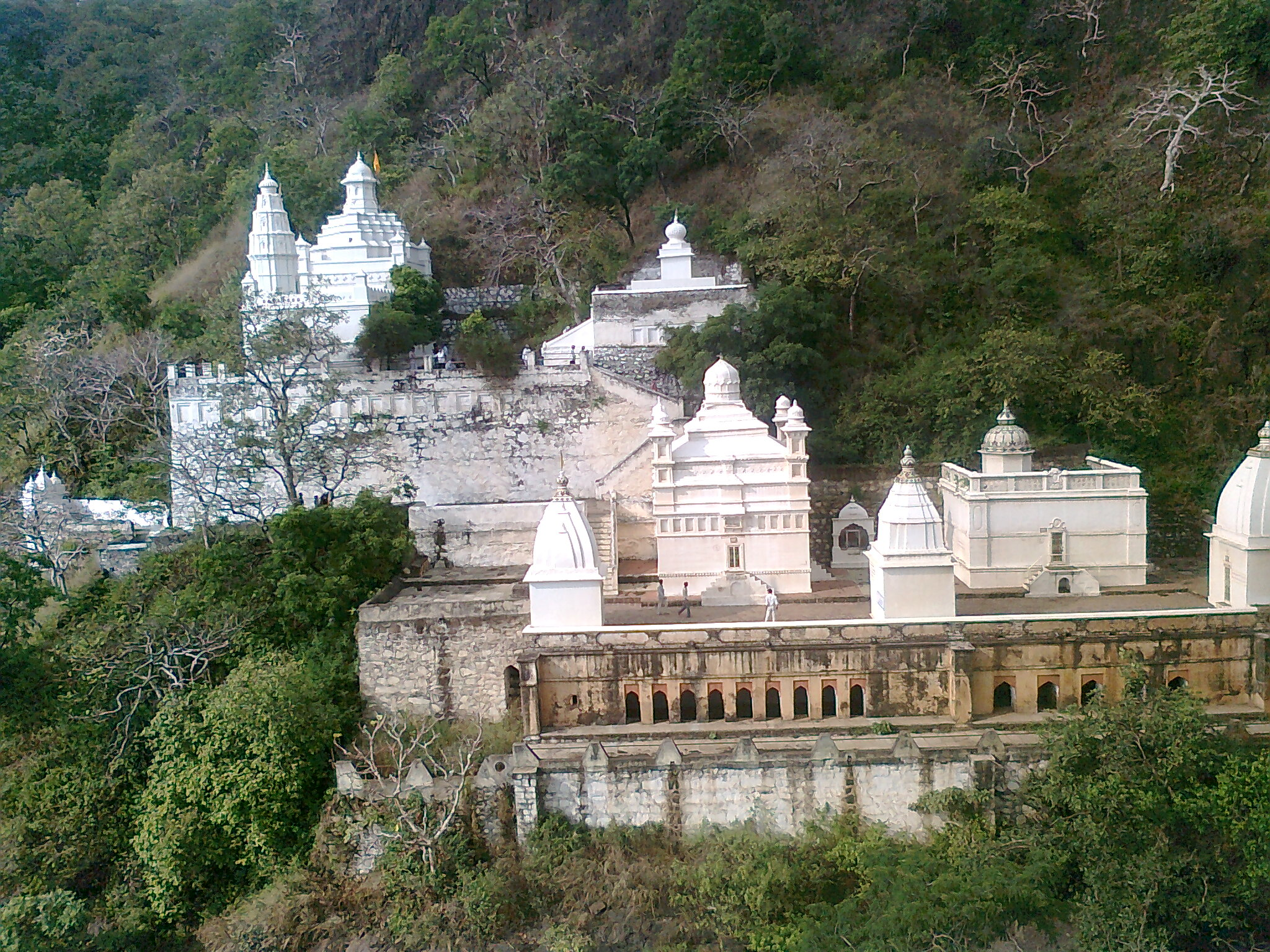
Muktagiri Temples

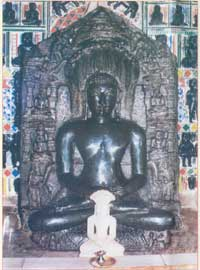
The idol of Parshvanatha in 26th temple

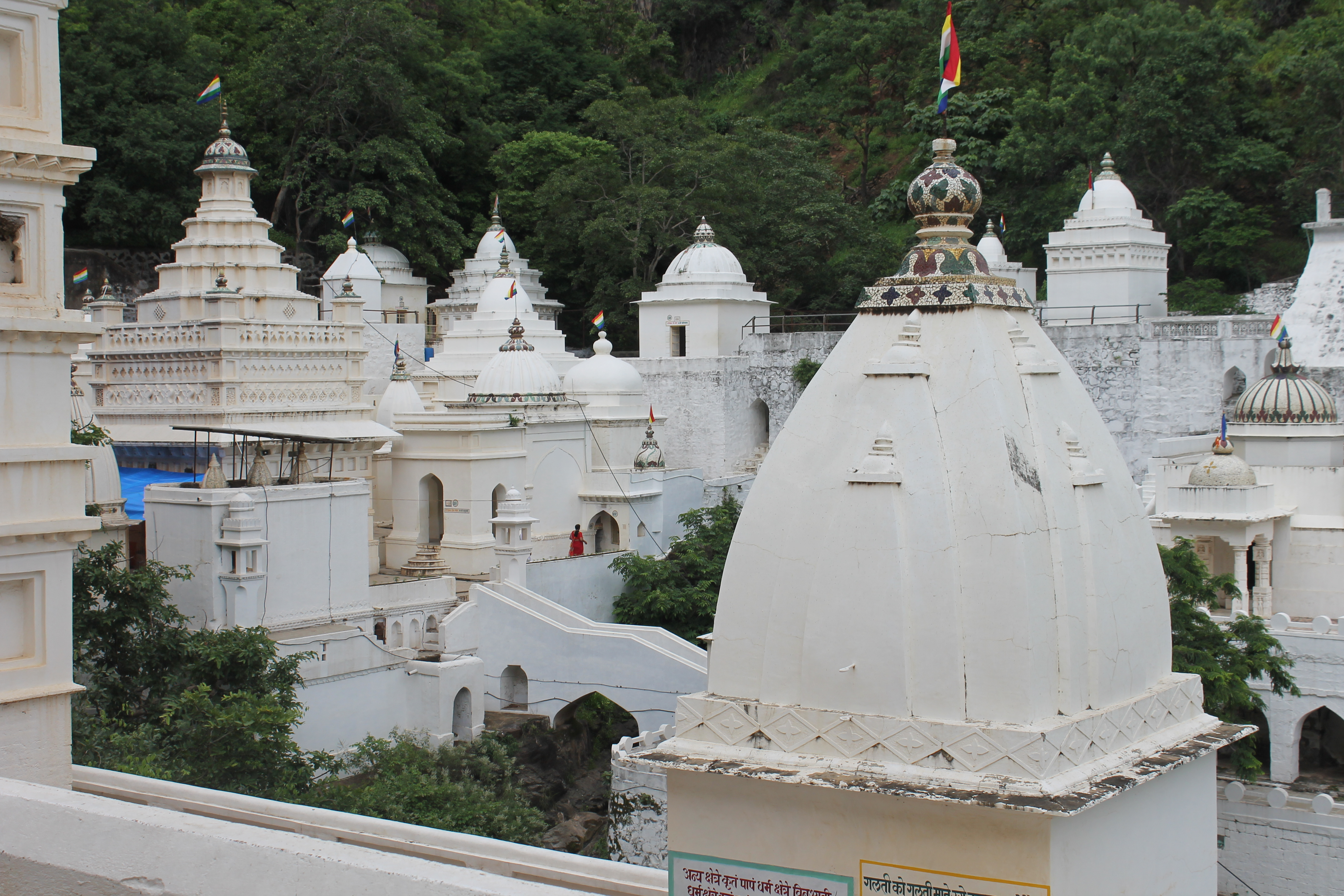
Muktagiri temples

== See also ==
- Sonagiri
- Bawangaja
- Kundalpur
