= Narmadapuram division =

Administrative division of Madhya Pradesh, India

Coordinates: 22.7500°N 77.7200°E

Map of Narmadapuram Division

Narmadapuram Division is one of the administrative divisions in the Indian state of Madhya Pradesh. Its capital is in Hoshangabad, officially Narmadapuram.

The division was formally inaugurated on 27 August 2008. It comprises Narmadapuram, Harda, and Betul districts. The three districts were earlier part of Bhopal Division.

Major cities of Narmadapuram Division -

- Narmadapuram
- Itarsi
- Betul
- Harda
- Sarni
- Pipariya
- Multai
- Seoni Malwa
- Amla
- Sohagpur
