= Lower Wardha Dam =

- Location within Maharashtra
- Official name: Lower Wardha Dam D03003
- Location: Dhanodi near Arvi in Wardha District
- Coordinates: 20.8787815°N 78.2684469°E
- Owners: Government of Maharashtra, India

Dam and spillways
- Type of dam: Earthfill; Gravity
- Impounds: Wardha River
- Height: 27.8 m (91 ft)
- Length: 9,464 m (31,050 ft)
- Dam volume: 2,639 km^{3} (633 cu mi)

Reservoir
- Total capacity: 216,870 km^{3} (52,030 cu mi)
- Surface area: 54,654 km^{2} (21,102 sq mi)

Lower Wardha Dam is an earthfill and gravity dam on Wardha river at Varud (Baggaji) Dhanodi near Arvi in Wardha district but falls under Amravati district in the state of Maharashtra in India.

== Specifications ==
The height of the dam above lowest foundation is 27.8 m (91 ft) while the length is 9,464 m (31,050 ft). The volume content is 2,639 km^{3} (633 cu mi) and gross storage capacity is 253,340.00 km^{3} (60,779.50 cu mi).

This project's initial contract value is INR 417.30 Millions.

== Location ==
This dam is located at 20.877819, 78.259821 close to a village named Dhanodi near Arvi, in Wardha District of the state of Maharashtra.

== Purpose ==
- Irrigation and water supply

== See also ==
- Dams in Maharashtra
- List of reservoirs and dams in India
