= Betul tehsil =

Betul
- Tehsil
- Location in Madhya Pradesh Betul (India)
- Coordinates: 21.910803°N 77.901184°E
- Country: India
- State: Madhya Pradesh
- District: Betul district

Government
  - Type: Janpad Panchayat
  - Body: Council

Area
  - Total: 973.14 km^{2} (375.73 sq mi)

Population (2011)
  - Total: 280,179

Languages
  - Official: Hindi
- Time zone: UTC+5:30 (IST)
- Postal code (PIN): 460001
- Area code: 07141
- ISO 3166 code: MP-IN
- Vehicle registration: MP 48
- No. of Villages: 193
- Sex ratio: 961

Betul tehsil is a fourth-order administrative and revenue division, a subdivision of third-order administrative and revenue division of Betul district of Madhya Pradesh.

== Geography ==
Betul tehsil has an area of 973.14 sq kilometers. It is bounded by Bhainsdehi tehsil in the southwest and west, Chicholi tehsil in the northwest, Ghodadongari tehsil in the north and northeast, Amla tehsil in the east, Multai tehsil in the southeast and Athner tehsil in the south.

== See also ==
- Betul district
