= Chicholi tehsil =

Subdivision of Betul district, Madhya Pradesh, India

Chicholi
- Tehsil
- Location in Madhya Pradesh Chicholi (India)
- Coordinates: 22.008395°N 77.671837°E
- Country: India
- State: Madhya Pradesh
- District: Betul district

Government
  - Type: Janpad Panchayat
  - Body: Council

Area
  - Total: 438.04 km^{2} (169.13 sq mi)

Population (2011)
  - Total: 86,795

Languages
  - Official: Hindi
- Time zone: UTC+5:30 (IST)
- Postal code (PIN): 460330
- Area code: 07145
- ISO 3166 code: MP-IN
- Vehicle registration: MP 48
- No. of Villages: 80
- Sex ratio: 983

Chicholi tehsil is a fourth-order administrative and revenue division, a subdivision of third-order administrative and revenue division of Betul district of Madhya Pradesh.

== Geography ==
Chicholi tehsil has an area of 438.04 sq kilometers. It is bounded by Harda district in the southwest, west and northwest, Hoshangabad district in the north, Shahpur tehsil in the northeast and east, Betul tehsil in the southeast and Bhainsdehi tehsil in the south.

== See also ==
- Betul district
