= Shahpur tehsil, Madhya Pradesh =

Shahpur
- Tehsil
- Location in Madhya Pradesh Shahpur (India)
- Coordinates: 22.194001°N 77.904868°E
- Country: India
- State: Madhya Pradesh
- District: Betul district

Government
  - Type: Janpad Panchayat
  - Body: Council

Area
  - Total: 594.37 km^{2} (229.49 sq mi)

Population (2011)
  - Total: 113,306

Languages
  - Official: Hindi
- Time zone: UTC+5:30 (IST)
- Postal code (PIN): 460440
- Area code: 07146
- ISO 3166 code: MP-IN
- Vehicle registration: MP 48
- No. of Villages: 131
- Sex ratio: 985

Shahpur tehsil is a fourth-order administrative and revenue division, a subdivision of third-order administrative and revenue division of Betul district of Madhya Pradesh.

== Geography ==
Shahpur tehsil has an area of 594.37 sq kilometers. It is bounded by Chicholi tehsil in the southwest, west and northwest, Hoshangabad district in the north and northeast and Ghodadongari tehsil in the east, southeast and south.

== See also ==
- Betul district
