= Barsali =

- village
- Location in India
- Coordinates: 21°55′5.87″N 78°0′43.74″E
- Country: India
- State: Madhya Pradesh
- District: Betul
- Tehsil: Betul

Population (2011)
  - Total: 682

Languages
  - Official: Hindi
- Time zone: UTC+5:30 (IST)

Barsali is a village located in Betul tehsil, in Betul district of Madhya Pradesh, India. It is the location of the geographical centre of India.
