= Yuva Janata Dal =

Yuva Janata Dal (Young People's Party) was the youth wing of the erstwhile Janata Dal. YJD was a member of World Federation of Democratic Youth. The youth wings of the JD splinter groups have similar names such as Yuva Janata Dal (Secular), Yuva Janata Dal (United), Yuva Rashtriya Janata Dal, Loktantrik Yuva Janata Dal etc.
