= Chicholi =

Chicholi Chicholi
- Census town
- Location in Madhya Pradesh, India
- Coordinates: 22.01°N 77.66°E
- Country: India
- State: Madhya Pradesh
- District: Betul

Area
  - Total: 8 km^{2} (3.1 sq mi)
- Elevation: 642 m (2,106 ft)

Population (2011)
  - Total: 9,278
  - Density: 1,160/km^{2} (3,000/sq mi)

Languages
  - Official: Hindi
- Time zone: UTC+5:30 (IST)
- Postal code: 460330
- Vehicle registration: MP48

Chicholi is a census town and a municipal committee in the Betul district in the Indian state of Madhya Pradesh.

== Economy ==
Its people depend on farming and business. Wheat, maize and soybeans are the main crops.

== Geography ==
Three lakes and two small rivers surround this city. The average rainfall of Chicholi is 1053mm per year. The highest temperature is about 45-47°C, and the lowest is approximately 4-5°C.

== Culture ==
Hindu Temple Chandi Mata is situated in Chicholi tehsil. Bhoot Mela (Ghost Fair) at Malajpur village is 7 km away. The fair is held annually, from Paush Purnima to Basant Panchami and is associated with the samadhi of Guru Baba Sahib.

== Transport ==
The nearest railway station is Betul Railway Station.

== Governance ==
Chicholi City is divided into 15 wards, for which elections are held every five years. Chicholi Nagar Panchayat has a total administration of over 1,936 households to which it supplies basic amenities like water and sewerage. It is authorised to build roads within Nagar Panchayat limits and impose taxes on properties under its jurisdiction.

== Demographics ==
As of 2011 India census, Chicholi Nagar Panchayat has a population of 9,282, of which 4,819 are males while 4,463 are females.

The population of children aged 0-6 is 1101, which is 11.86% of the total population of Chicholi (NP). In Chicholi Nagar Panchayat, the female sex ratio is 926 against the state average of 931. The child sex ratio is around 908 compared to the Madhya Pradesh state average of 918. The literacy rate of Chicholi City is 90.17%, higher than the state average of 69.32%. Male literacy is around 93.68%, while female literacy is 86.39%.
