= Bhainsdehi =

- city
- Location in Madhya Pradesh, India Bhainsdehi (India)
- Coordinates: 21.65°N 77.63°E
- Country: India
- State: Madhya Pradesh
- District: Betul
- Elevation: 741 m (2,431 ft)

Population (2023)
  - Total: 289,295

Languages
  - Official: Hindi
- Time zone: UTC+5:30 (IST)
- ISO 3166 code: IN-MP
- Vehicle registration: MP

Bhainsdehi is a city and a Nagar Parishad in Betul district in the state of Madhya Pradesh, India. According to mythological beliefs, Bhainsdehi was known as Mahishmati, the capital of Raghuvanshi King Gaya. Which later changed from Mahishmati to Mahishvati and then to Mahishadehi and then to Bhainsdehi. Kukru is the second highest point of Mahadeo hills. Bhainsdehi is the originating place of the river Purna. It is predominantly a tribal tehsil. Bhainsdehi is surrounded by the mountain ranges of Satpura. Prachin Shiv mandir one of the most beautiful place in Bhainsdehi city

== Scenic Spots ==
1. Kukru Eco Tourism Center
2. Purna River source
3. Muktagiri, or Mendhagiri (52 Temples)
4. Prachin Shiv Temple
5. Dhuni Wale Dadaji Temple
6. Shardha Temple
7. Sai Temple
8. Shyama Mukherjee Park
9. Devi Temple
10. Bagdara Sports Stadium
11. Church
12. Atal Bihari Vajpayee Stadium
13. Hanuman Temple
14. Sheetla Mata Mandir
15. Wind Mill Dedpani
16. Renuka Mata Temple Dhamangaon
17. Government Garden Katol Nursery Bhainsdehi
18. Ram Mandir

19.Gupatwada Shiv Temple

== Kukru:The sun sets between seven mountains ==
The sun sets between the mountains along the Satpura mountain range near Bhondiyakund village at a height of 3676 feet above sea level. Two of these are in the border of Maharashtra and five are in the border of Madhya Pradesh. The view of the sunset here pleases the people. Attracts towards itself. Sipna river originates from Bhondiakund Madhya Pradesh on the fifth hill from the Sun among the Seven Mountains. This river flows only two to three kilometers in the state, after which it goes towards Amravati via Melghat Tiger Reserve Corridor of Maharashtra. At sunset, it looks like Mahim Rekha.

== Geography ==
Bhainsdehi is located at 21.65°N 77.63°E. It has an average elevation of 741 metres (2,431 feet). It is bounded by Maharashtra border Khandwa District in the west, Bhimpur and Chicholi tehsil in the north, Aathner tehsil in the east and Maharashtra border in the south.

== Demographics ==
As of 2001 India census, Bhainsdehi had a population of 15,756. Males constitute 51% of the population and females 49%. Bhainsdehi has an average literacy rate of 70%, higher than the national average of 59.5%; with 56% of the males and 44% of the females literate. 14% of the population is under 6 years of age.

== transport ==
- bus*

Well connected to all the main cities of Madhya Pradesh, Maharashtra and Betul, Hoshangabad, Bhopal, Indore, Khandwa, Nagpur, Amravati, Akola, Shegaon.

- railway*

Malkapur Road railway station is a railway station of Bhopal–Nagpur section under Nagpur CR railway division of West Central Railway zone of Indian Railways. The station is situated at Bhainsdehi, Malkapur in Betul district of Indian state of Madhya Pradesh.

== See also ==
- Bhimpur
