= Betül =

Betül is a feminine Turkish given name meaning "pure" or "chaste".

== People ==
=== Given name ===
- Betül Cemre Yıldız (born 1989), Turkish chess player
- Betül Kaçar (born 1983), American astrobiologist
- Betül Mardin (born 1926), Turkish public relations specialist
- Betül Nur Yılmaz, Turkish football referee
- Betül Tanbay (born 1960), Turkish mathematician
- Betül Taygar (born 1997), Turkish ice hockey player
- Betül Yılmaz (born 1988), Turkish handball player
- Meryem Betül Çavdar, Turkish Para Taekwondo practitioner
