= Amla, Madhya Pradesh =

Amla Aamla
- Town
- Location in Madhya Pradesh, India Amla (India)
- Coordinates: 21.924335°N 78.127856°E
- Country: India
- State: Madhya Pradesh
- District: Betul
- Subdivision: Amla Tehsil

Government
  - Body: Amla Municipal Council

Area
  - Total: 6 km^{2} (2.3 sq mi)
- Elevation: 737 m (2,418 ft)

Population (2011)
  - Total: 30,215
  - Density: 4,728/km^{2} (12,250/sq mi)

Languages
  - Official: Hindi
- Time zone: UTC+5:30 (IST)
- PIN -->: 460551, 460553
- Telephone_code: 07147
- ISO 3166 code: IN-MP
- Vehicle registration: MP 48

Amla is a municipality located in Betul district in the Indian state of Madhya Pradesh. It is the administrative center and only municipality of the Amla Subdivision.

== History ==
Historically, Amla belonged to the Central Provinces of British India. The long Mohammedan dominion of the Central Provinces left its mark in the names of several places in the district, many of which were named after plants or trees. Amla was named after the Mango(Ām) fruit.

A popular theory claims that the name Amla is short for Ammunition Land. However, this is only a backronym that was invented in recent times.

Before 1989, Amla railway station was used as a base kitchen for catering. In 1989, the base kitchen was shifted to Itarsi.

== Geography ==
Bodkhi and Amla Town markets are situated in the sub-district. Pachama is the biggest waterfall, located 20 kilometres from the railway station.

== Government ==
The city is divided into 18 wards. Amla is the sub-district headquarters. The district headquarters is Betul. Bhopal is the state headquarters for the city.

== Education ==
The major educational institutions are:

- Govt BR Ambedkar College Hasalpur, Amla
- Nandkishore Patel Mahavidyalaya Amla
- Kendriya Vidyalaya Amla
- Basic School (Govt.), Amla
- Paradise Higher Secondary School Amla
- Capital Public High School Amla
- Life Career School (CBSE School)
- Guru Nanak Higher Secondary School
- Thakur Indal Singh Girls College
- Indian Computer Science & Technology Institute Affiliated By Maharshi Mahesh Yogi Vaidik Vishwavidhyalaya, Jabalpur
- Jawaharlal Nehru College, Amla
- St. Thomas Mission High School, Mangal Bhavan, Amla
- Motherland Public School, Rateda Road, Amla
- New Ideal School, Govind Colony Amla
- Pandit Shankar Lal Sharma School, Amla

== Worship locations ==
A Hanuman Temple is situated near Govind Colony. A temple of Renuka Mata is located in Chhawal. Near it, the remains of ancient Buddhist idols of Bodhisatva, Avalokiteshvara and vajarpani are seen in Kajali and Kanojia and a beautiful Buddhist temple is also located in Bhimnagar, in which Buddhist followers from all over the country and abroad keep visiting.

A Shani Mandir located in Gorakshnath Colony in Amla adorned with Murtis of Lord Shani Dev, Lord Hanuman, Lord Shivas Family, Navgraha Murtis and Shaligram Stone. Mandir was recently inaugurated on 19 December 2021. The Mandir is built in memories of Shri Phool Singh Thakur's beloved parents, Shri Indal Singh Thakur and Shrimati Savitri Devi Thakur.

== Demographics ==
As of a 2011 Indian census, Amla had a population of 30,215, including 15,562 males and 14,653 females. Children aged 0–6 number 3,141, 10.40% of the total. The female sex ratio is 942 against the state average of 931. The child sex ratio in Amla is around 961 compared to the Madhya Pradesh state average of 918.

The literacy rate is 89.04%, higher than the state average of 69.32%. The male literacy is around 94.36%, while the female literacy rate is around 83.38%.

The population density is 4,728 persons per km^{2}.

Religion in Amla City (2011)
Religion	Percent
Hinduism	88.19%
Islam	7.15%
Jainism	0.78%
Sikhism	0.42%
Christianity	0.60%
Buddhism	2.82%
Others	0.02%
Distribution of religions

== Transport ==
Amla junction is the main junction of the Betul district.

The nearest railway station is within the city. Amla accommodates a rail junction, served by broad gauge lines, which connects the sub-district to Itarsi (in the north), Nagpur (in the southeast), and Chhindwara (in the east).
