= Shahpur, Betul =

Shahpur, Betul Shahpur
- Census town
- Location in Madhya Pradesh, India Shahpur, Betul (India)
- Coordinates: 21.23°N 76.22°E
- Country: India
- State: Madhya Pradesh
- District: Betul
- Elevation: 238 m (781 ft)

Population (2001)
  - Total: 3,997

Languages
  - Official: Hindi
- Time zone: UTC+5:30 (IST)
- ISO 3166 code: IN-MP
- Vehicle registration: MP-48

Shahpur is a census town in Betul district in the Indian state of Madhya Pradesh.

== Geography ==
Shahpur is located near the bank of Machna River. There is a small town named Chopna located 18 KM from Shahpur. In Chopna region 36 Bangali villages. There is a Lord Hanuman temple near Aamdhana.

== Demographics ==
As of 2001 India census, Shahpur had a population of 3997. Males constitute 53% of the population and females 47%. Shahpur has an average literacy rate of 80%, higher than the national average of 59.5%: male literacy is 85%, and female literacy is 74%. In Shahpur, 11% of the population is under 6 years of age.
