= Multai railway station =

Railway station in Madhya Pradesh, India

Multai

General information
- Location: Multai, Betul district, Madhya Pradesh; India
- Coordinates: 21°46′58″N 78°15′48″E
- Elevation: 758 metres (2,487 ft)
- System: Indian Railways station
- Owner: Indian Railways
- Operator: Central Railway
- Line: Bhopal–Nagpur section
- Platforms: 3
- Tracks: 3

Construction
- Structure type: Standard (on ground)
- Parking: Yes

Other information
- Status: Functioning
- Station code: MTY
- Zone(s): Central Railway
- Division(s): Nagpur CR
Location
- Location within India Location within Madhya Pradesh

Multai railway station is a railway station in Multai town of Madhya Pradesh. Its code is MTY. It serves Multai town. The station consists of three platforms. Passenger, Express and Superfast trains halt here.
