= Multai tehsil =

Multai
- Tehsil
- Location in Madhya Pradesh Multai (India)
- Coordinates: 21.775182°N 78.257126°E
- Country: India
- State: Madhya Pradesh
- District: Betul district

Government
  - Type: Janpad Panchayat
  - Body: Council

Area
  - Total: 807.93 km^{2} (311.94 sq mi)

Population (2011)
  - Total: 287,078

Languages
  - Official: Hindi
- Time zone: UTC+5:30 (IST)
- Postal code (PIN): 460660
- Area code: 07147
- ISO 3166 code: MP-IN
- Vehicle registration: MP 48
- No. of Villages: 267
- Sex ratio: 970

Multai tehsil is a fourth-order administrative and revenue division, a subdivision of third-order administrative and revenue division of Betul district of Madhya Pradesh.

== Geography ==
Multai tehsil has an area of 807.93 sq kilometers. It is bounded by Athner tehsil in the southwest and west, Betul tehsil in the northwest, Amla tehsil in the north, Chhindwara district in the northeast and east and Maharashtra in the southeast and south.

== See also ==
- Betul district
- Prabhat Pattan
