= Betul railway station =

Railway station in Betul, India

BETUL

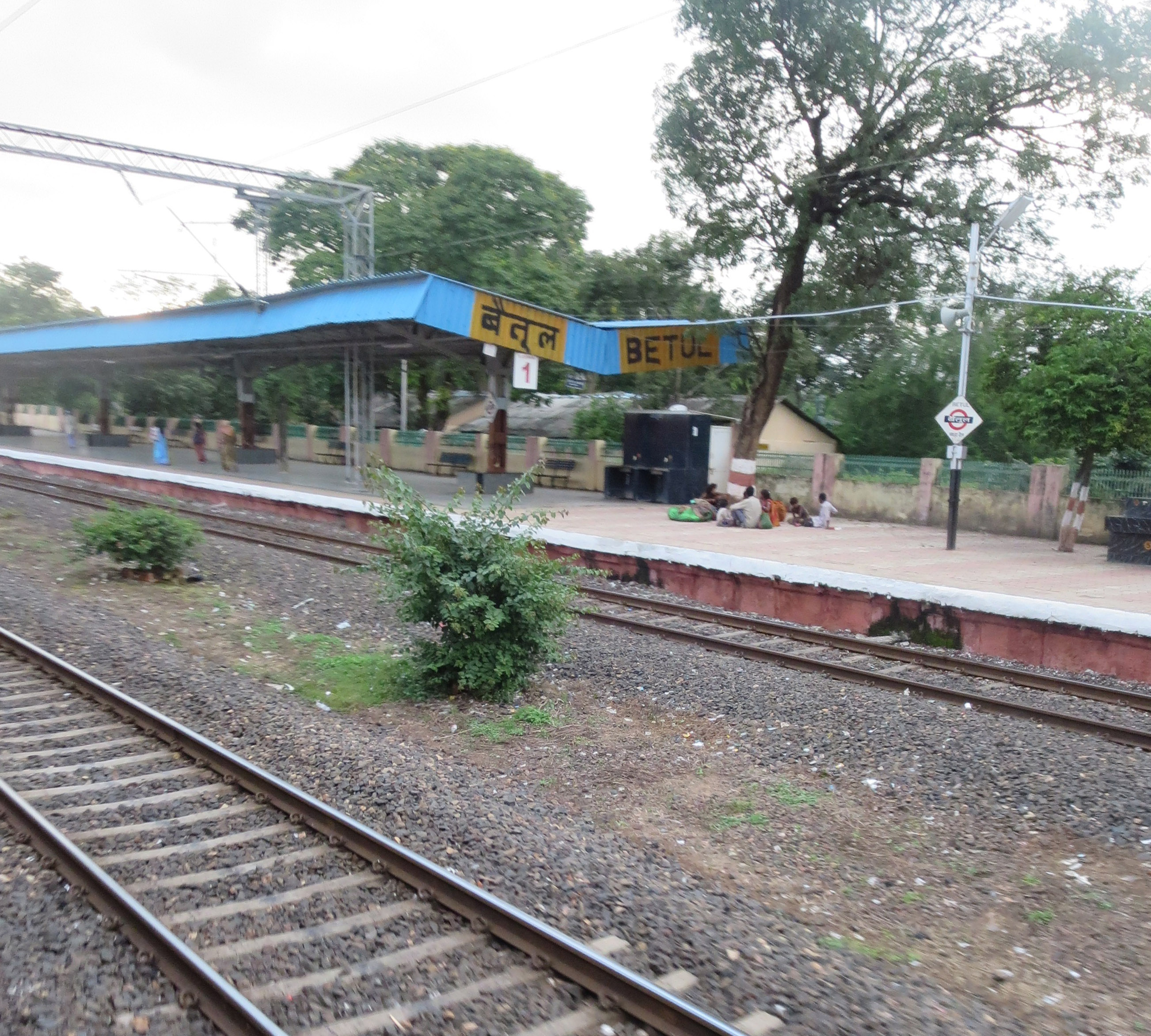
- Betul railway station

General information
- Location: Betul, Betul district, Madhya Pradesh; India
- Coordinates: 21°53′49″N 77°54′23″E
- Elevation: 643 metres (2,110 ft)
- System: Indian Railways station
- Owner: Indian Railways
- Operator: Central Railway
- Line: Bhopal–Nagpur section
- Platforms: 3
- Tracks: 3

Construction
- Structure type: Standard (on ground)
- Parking: Yes

Other information
- Status: Functioning
- Station code: BZU
- Zone(s): Central Railway
- Division(s): Nagpur CR
Location
- Location within India Location within Madhya Pradesh

Betul railway station is a railway station serving Betul town and district of Madhya Pradesh State of India. It is under Nagpur CR railway division of Central Railway Zone of Indian Railways.

It is located at 643 m above sea level and has three platforms. As of 2016, an electrified double broad-gauge railway line exists and at this station, 89 trains stop with 2 originating and 2 terminating trains.

Nagpur Airport is 155 kilometers away.
