= Betul, Madhya Pradesh =

Betul
- City
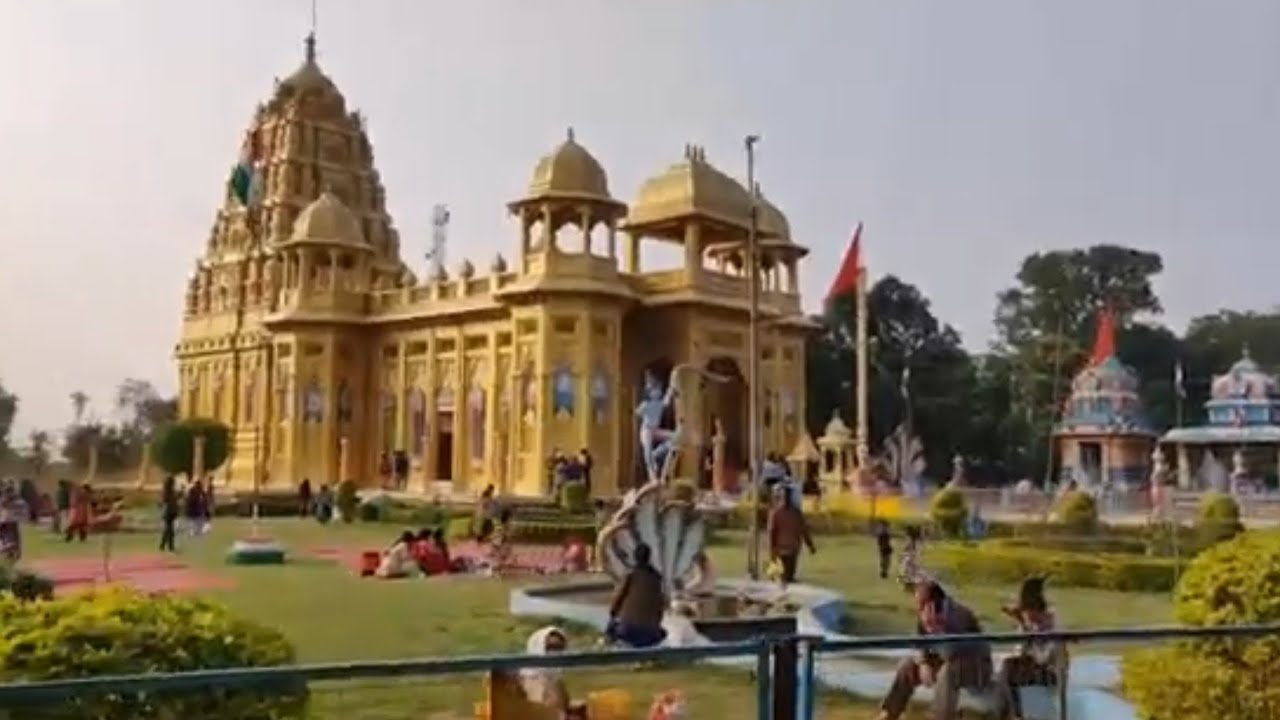
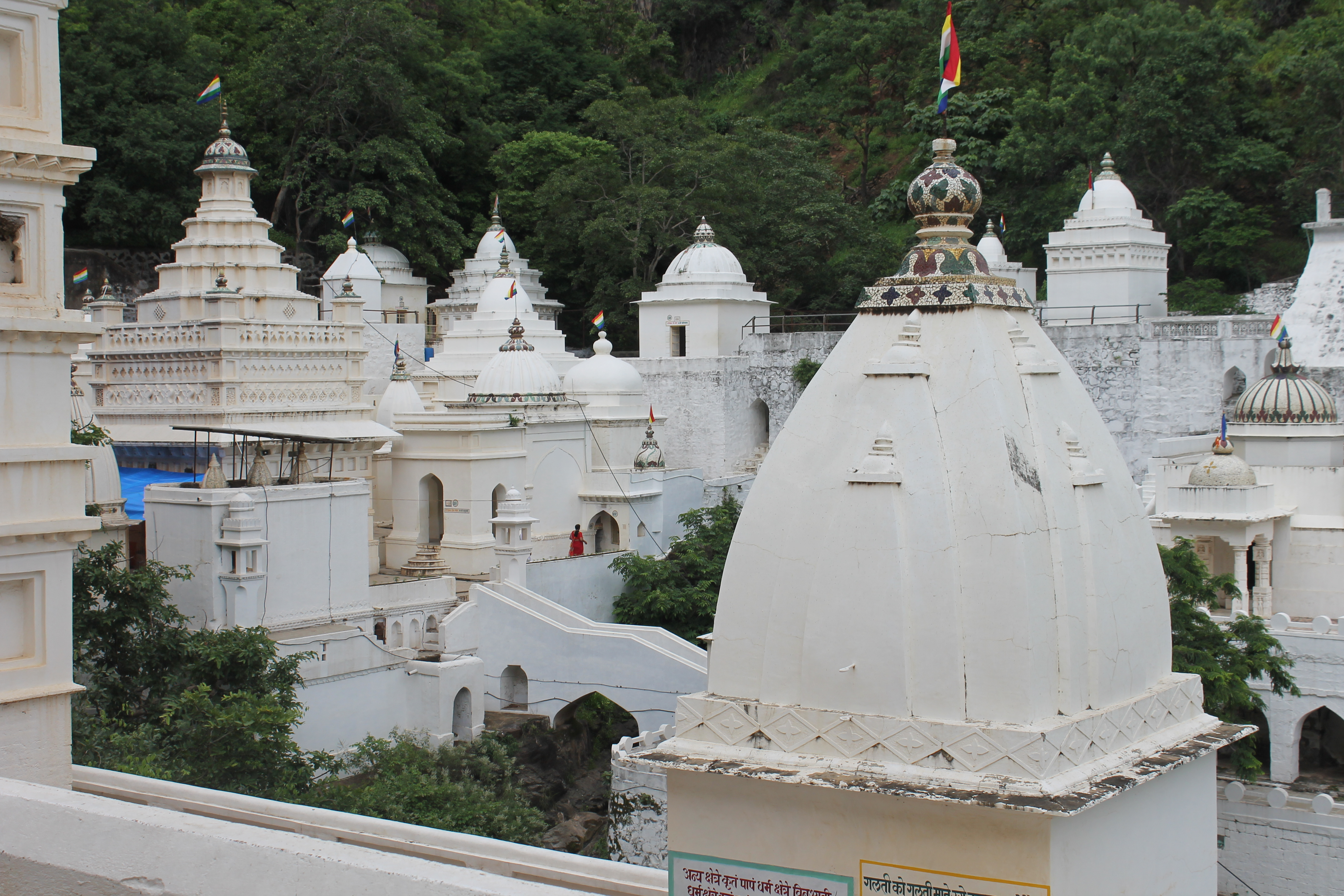
- Temples in Betul Shri Balajipuram Temple, Muktagiri Jain Group of Temples

- Location within Madhya Pradesh
- Coordinates: 21.905°N 77.902°E
- Country: India
- State: Madhya Pradesh
- District: Betul

Government
  - Type: Municipal Council
  - Body: Municipal Council Betul

Area
  - Total: 193 km^{2} (75 sq mi)
- Elevation: 658 m (2,159 ft)

Population (2011)
  - Total: 153,330
  - Density: 794/km^{2} (2,060/sq mi)

Languages
  - Official: Hindi
- Time zone: UTC+5:30 (IST)
- ISO 3166 code: IN-MP
- Vehicle registration: MP-48
- Website: betul.nic.in

Betul (Hindi pronunciation: [bɛːt̪uːl]) is Municipal Council town in Madhya Pradesh, India. It is the administrative head-quarter of Betul district and forms the southernmost part of the Narmadapuram Division.

== Name ==
During the early 20th century, Betul was known as Badnur.

== History ==
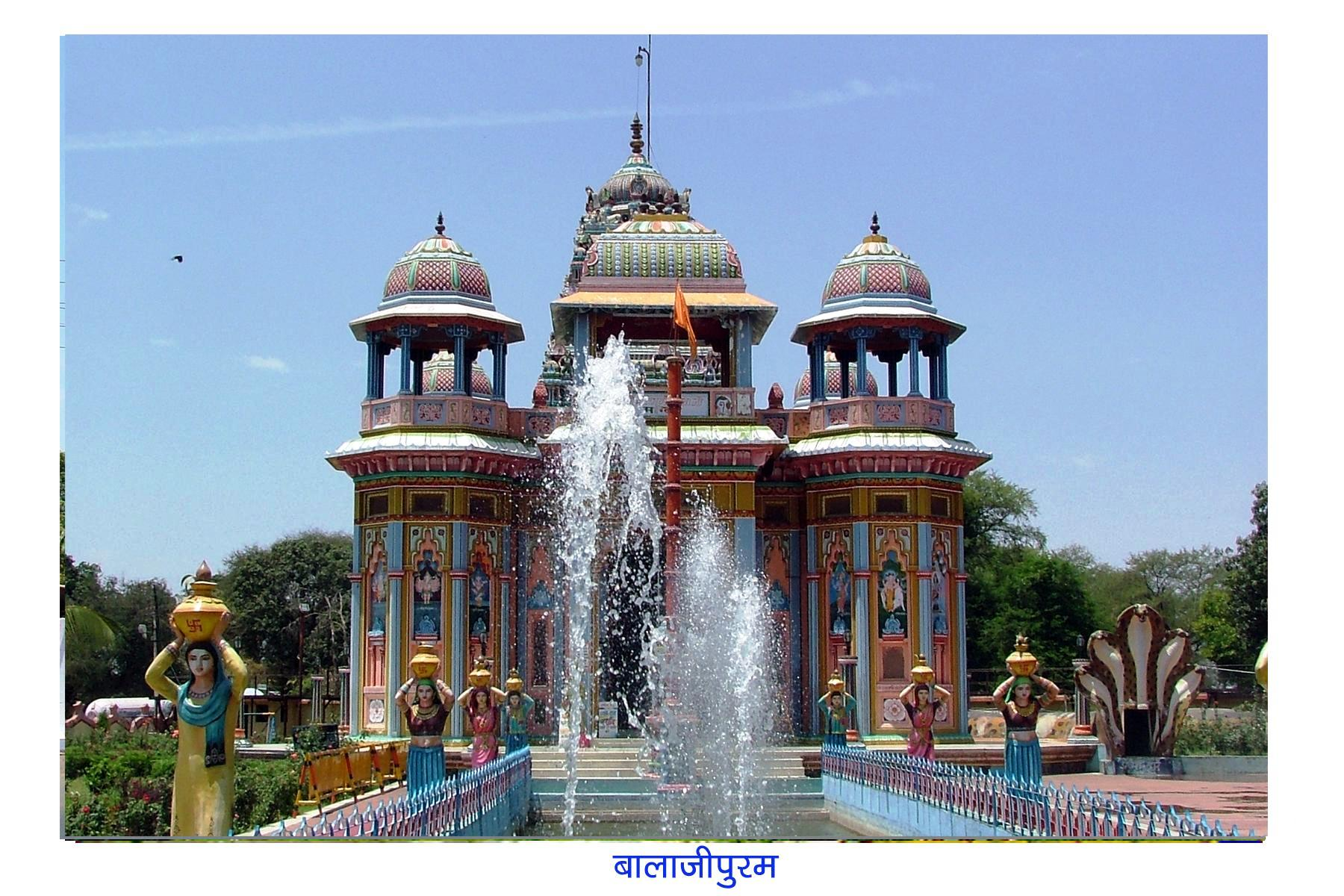
Balajipuram Temple in Betul

Nearby fort called Kherla Quila was formerly the seat of an independent kingdom of the Gonds in the medieval and early modern period. Under Company Rule, its fort was permitted to fall into ruin. Badnur became the headquarters of Betul District in 1822. Surrounded by hills on all sides, it was used by the British for the exportation of coal. It supported two bazaars; the larger, Kothi Bazar, held 2015 people in the 1870s. At that time, the town had a circuit house, a dak bungalow, a caravanserai, jail, police station, pharmacy, and schools. Its population c. 1901 was 3766.

Following independence, Betul lay near the geographical center point of the new country, which is now marked by a stone at Barsali. Betul was connected to the Delhi–Chennai line of the Indian rail network in the early 1950s. It now serves as a junction point, providing the access to the Chhindwara District on broad-gauge rail.

== Geography ==
Betul is located at 21.92°N 77.9°E, near the geographical center point of modern India. It has an average elevation of 658 m (2,159 ft).

== Climate ==
Climate data for Betul, Madhya Pradesh (1981–2010, extremes 1948–2020)
Month	Jan	Feb	Mar	Apr	May	Jun	Jul	Aug	Sep	Oct	Nov	Dec	Year
Record high °C (°F)	34.9 (94.8)	37.8 (100.0)	42.3 (108.1)	44.4 (111.9)	48.0 (118.4)	44.7 (112.5)	38.6 (101.5)	33.6 (92.5)	35.5 (95.9)	36.8 (98.2)	35.0 (95.0)	32.7 (90.9)	48.0 (118.4)
Mean daily maximum °C (°F)	27.3 (81.1)	30.5 (86.9)	35.2 (95.4)	38.9 (102.0)	40.7 (105.3)	35.5 (95.9)	28.9 (84.0)	27.4 (81.3)	29.8 (85.6)	31.4 (88.5)	29.3 (84.7)	28.1 (82.6)	31.9 (89.4)
Mean daily minimum °C (°F)	10.0 (50.0)	12.0 (53.6)	16.2 (61.2)	20.9 (69.6)	25.1 (77.2)	24.5 (76.1)	22.6 (72.7)	21.9 (71.4)	21.2 (70.2)	17.7 (63.9)	13.8 (56.8)	10.1 (50.2)	17.9 (64.2)
Record low °C (°F)	−0.2 (31.6)	1.1 (34.0)	2.3 (36.1)	10.6 (51.1)	16.6 (61.9)	14.9 (58.8)	14.5 (58.1)	13.1 (55.6)	10.5 (50.9)	5.0 (41.0)	2.6 (36.7)	1.3 (34.3)	−0.2 (31.6)
Average rainfall mm (inches)	17.1 (0.67)	10.8 (0.43)	27.0 (1.06)	7.4 (0.29)	12.2 (0.48)	145.2 (5.72)	360.5 (14.19)	353.2 (13.91)	213.5 (8.41)	46.4 (1.83)	22.1 (0.87)	4.6 (0.18)	1,220.1 (48.04)
Average rainy days	1.0	0.9	1.8	0.9	0.6	8.3	15.4	15.6	8.9	2.8	1.8	0.3	58.3
Average relative humidity (%) (at 17:30 IST)	45	35	27	23	25	56	80	85	75	62	56	47	52
Source: India Meteorological Department

== Demographics ==
During the 2011 census of India, Betul had a population of 103,330. Males constitute 51.12% of the population, females 48.88%. Betul has an average literacy rate of 89.28%, higher than the national average of 74.04%. 10.82% of the population is under 6 years of age.

Religion in City of Betul (2011)
1. Hinduism (81.0%)
2. Islam (13.0%)
3. Jainism (3.40%)
4. Christianity (1.60%)
5. Other or Not stated (1.00%)

== Education ==
In Betul, there are total 72 number of colleges. Some main colleges are as follows

- Govt Jaywanti Haksar P G College Betul
- Government polytechnic college sonaghati Betul
- Bhimrao Ramrao Ambedkar College of Education, Run By Shri Ram Shiksha Parishad, Chakkar Road Ambedk
- Late Shri Nandkishore Singh Patel Memorial College, Near Link Road, Sadar, Betul
- Netaji Subhas Chandra Bose College
- Shri Ram Pharmacy College Jamthi Betul
- Shri Balaji Institute of Technology & Management, Betul

In Betul, there are many schools for primary and secondary education. Some of the main schools are

- Little Flower Senior Secondary School, Betul
- R D Public School, Kalapatha, Betul
- Satpuda Valley Public School, Sonaghati, Betul
- Kendriya Vidyalya Betul
- ELC English School
- Rathore Collage and School

== Transport ==
Betul railway station is a major railway station of its District, located between Bhopal and Nagpur station.

== Sources ==
- Baynes, T. S., ed. (1878), "Badnur" , Encyclopædia Britannica, vol. 3 (9th ed.), New York: Charles Scribner's Sons, pp. 228–229
- Chisholm, Hugh, ed. (1911), "Badnur" , Encyclopædia Britannica, vol. 3 (11th ed.), Cambridge University Press, p. 190
