= Multai =

Multai Multapi
- City
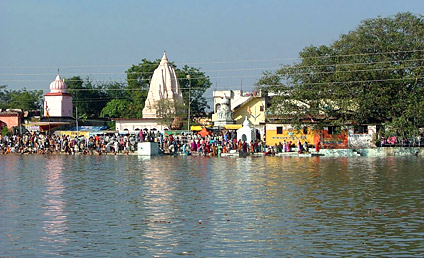
- Tapti River, Multai

- Location in Madhya Pradesh, India Multai (India)
- Coordinates: 21.77°N 78.25°E
- Country: India
- State: Madhya Pradesh
- District: Betul
- Elevation: 749 m (2,457 ft)

Population (2019)
  - Total: 161,819
- Time zone: UTC+5:30 (IST)
- PIN: 460661

Multai is a town and a Nagar Palika in Betul district in the Indian state of Madhya Pradesh.

== Geography ==
Multai is located at 21.77°N 78.25°E. It has an average elevation of 749 metres (2457 feet).

Two major rivers originate from Multai – Tapti and Wardha, the latter originating near Multai.

== Boundaries ==
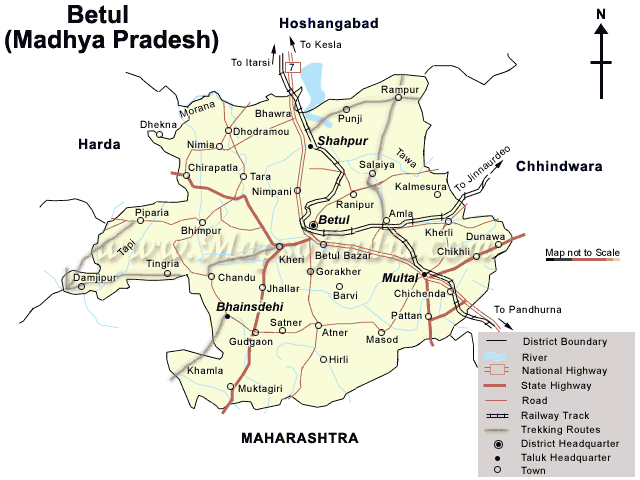
Betul District Map.

Multai is bounded on the north by town Amla, on the south by Amravati district of Maharashtra, on the east by Chhindwara District and on the west by the District Betul. The southern boundary of the city runs almost along the southern foothills of the Melghat range, but excludes Hatti Ghat and Chikaldara hills in Amravati district. Jambadi (6 KM), Sandiya (7 KM), Sirsawadi (7 KM), Karpa (8 KM), Narkhed (9 KM) are the nearby villages to Multai. Multai is surrounded by Prabhat Pattan Tehsil towards the south, Amla Tehsil towards the north, Warud Tehsil towards the south, and Pandhurna Tehsil towards the east.

== Demographics ==
As of 2011 India census, Multai is a Municipality city in district of Betul, Madhya Pradesh. Multai city is divided into 15 wards for which elections are held every 5 years. The Multai Municipality has a population of 29,976 of which 15,356 are males while 14,620 are females as per the report released by Census India 2011.

Population of children ages 0–6 is 3345 which is 11.16% of total population of Multai (M). In Multai Municipality, the female sex ratio is 952 against state average of 931. The child sex ratio in Multai is around 910 compared to Madhya Pradesh state average of 918. The literacy rate of Multai city is 88.10%, higher than the state average of 69.32%. In Multai, male literacy is around 91.61% while the female literacy rate is 84.42%.

Multai Municipality has total administration over 6,674 houses to which it supplies basic amenities like water and sewerage. It is also authorize to build roads within Municipality limits and impose taxes on properties coming under its jurisdiction.

== Origin ==
The original name of the city Multai was Multapi, named after the river Tapti that originates from here. During the Maratha regime and British rule, Multai was one of the regional headquarters connecting the District Headquarter in the north to the District Headquarter 'Nagpur' of Central India.

During the Maratha regime and British rule, Multai was one of the regional headquarters connecting the District Headquarter in the north to the District Headquarter 'Nagpur' of Central India.

== The Tapti River ==
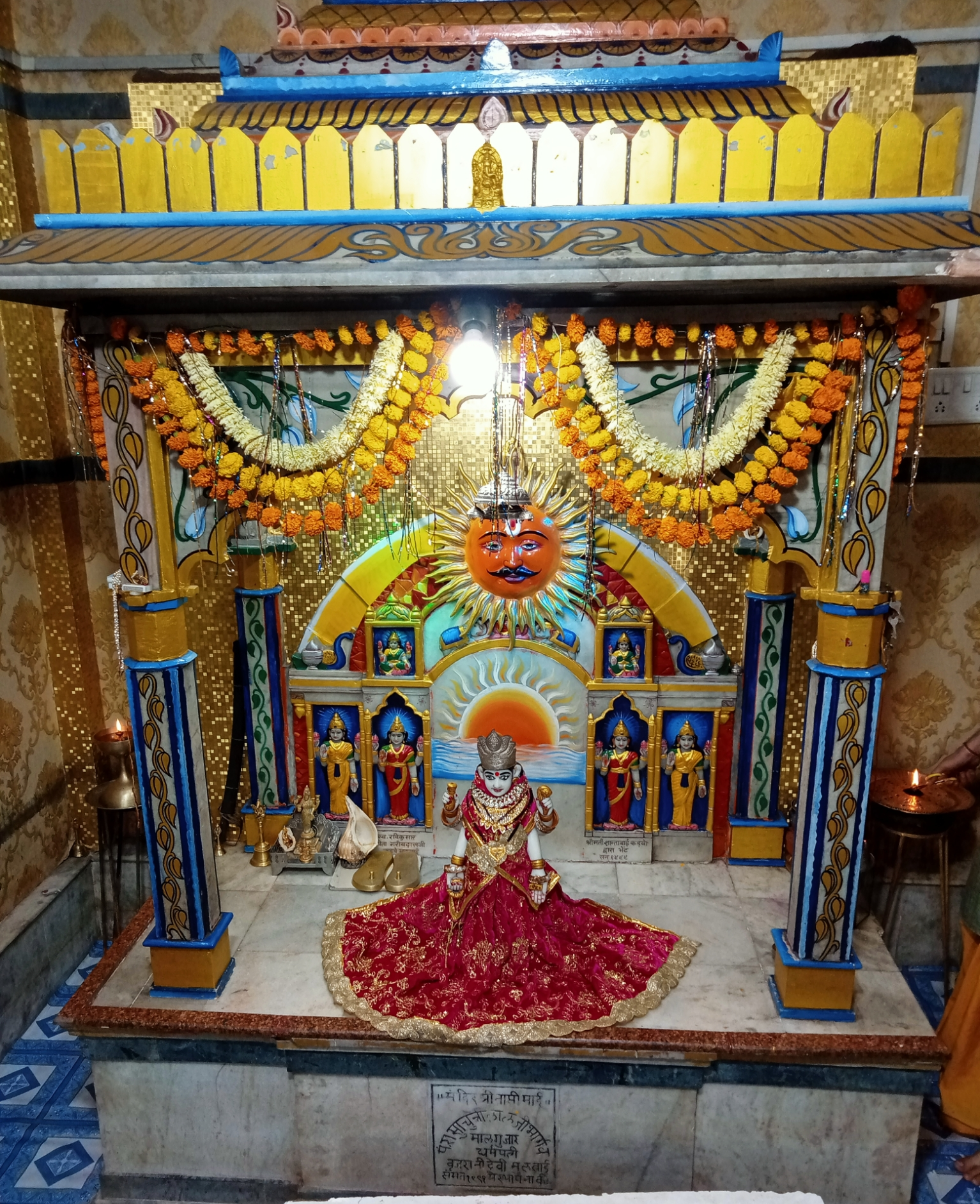
Multai Tapti ji Mandir

The Tapti River is one of the best place for tourism in Betul district.

=== Origin ===
'Tapti' also spelled as 'Tapi' is one of the major rivers in India. The total length of the Tapi river is approximately 724 km. It flows in the central parts of India. The river originates from Multai in Betul district of Madhya Pradesh in the Satpura range at an elevation of 752 meter above the sea level. The states through which the Tapi river flows include Maharashtra, Gujarat and Madhya Pradesh. Apart from the Narmada river, Tapi is the only river which flows in the westward direction and merges into the Arabian Sea. The Tapi basin extends to the total area of 65, 145 sq km, which is approximately 2.0% of the total geographical area of India. The main tributaries of the Tapi river are Purna, The Girna, The Panjhra, The Vaghur, the Bori and the Aner.

=== Religious significance ===
According to legend, Tapi river also known as Tapti, is the daughter of Surya (the Sun God). Some says that Surya created the Tapi river in order to save himself from his own intense heat. The river finds mention in the great Indian epic Mahabharata, according to which Tapti had married Sanvaran, a legendary hero of the moon dynasty. Tapti and Sanvaran also had the son called Kuru. It was on his name only the Kuru dynasty started. Tapi is considered as the Goddess among the Hindus and is worshiped among them . Multai Is known as pilgrimage place for Sikhs as Guru Nanak first guru of Sikhs visited the place in 1515 and stayed here for 14 days, during which he had discourse with king of Raisen Kadtur Ali.

== Transportation ==
Multai is well connected to its neighboring districts Amaravati, Betul, Amla, Nagpur, Chhindwara through rail and road. The nearest airport is Nagpur Airport.And The distance between Bhopal and Multai by train is approximately 244 kilometers.

== See also ==
- Prabhat Pattan
