= Betul district =

- District of Madhya Pradesh
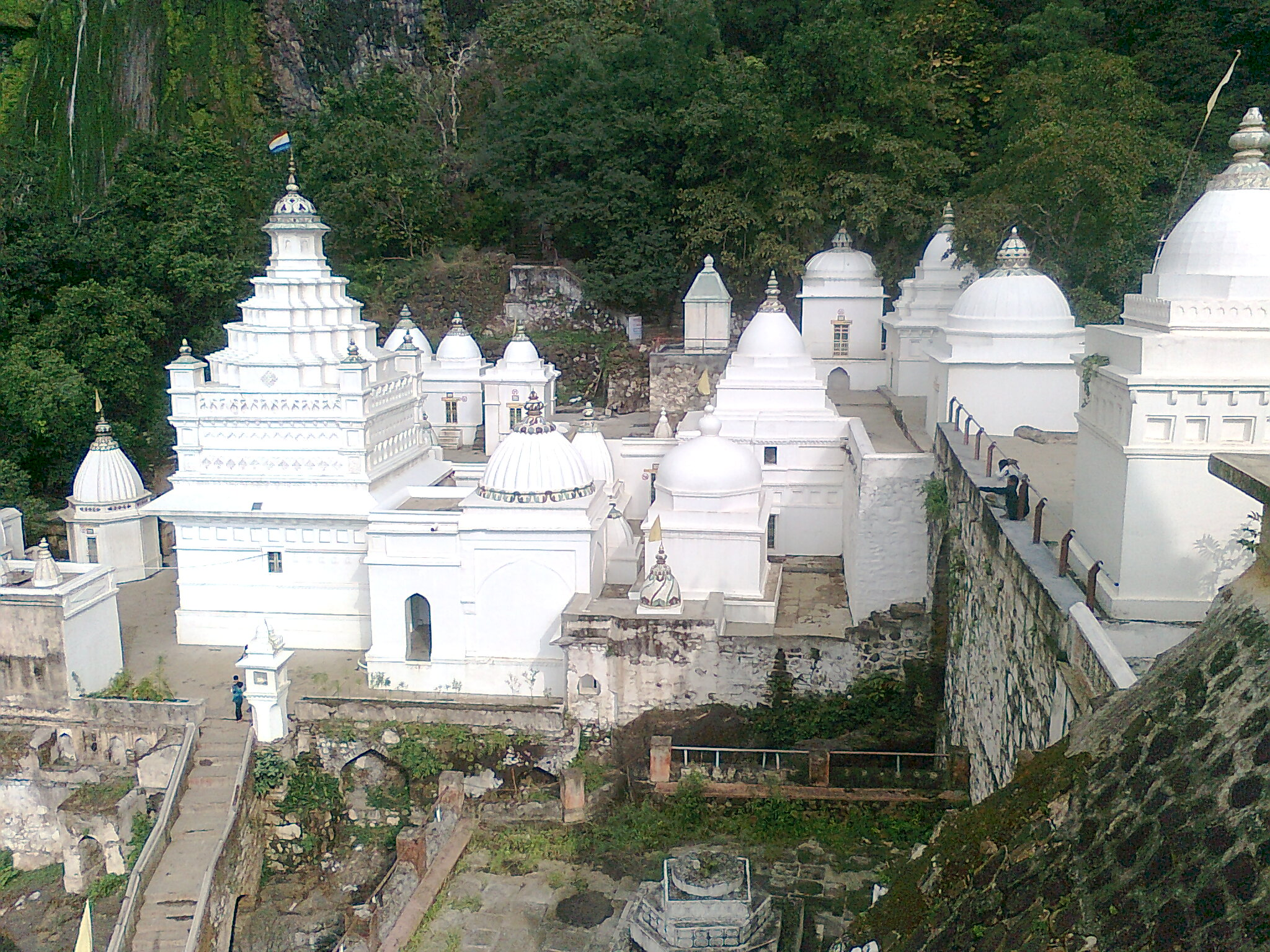
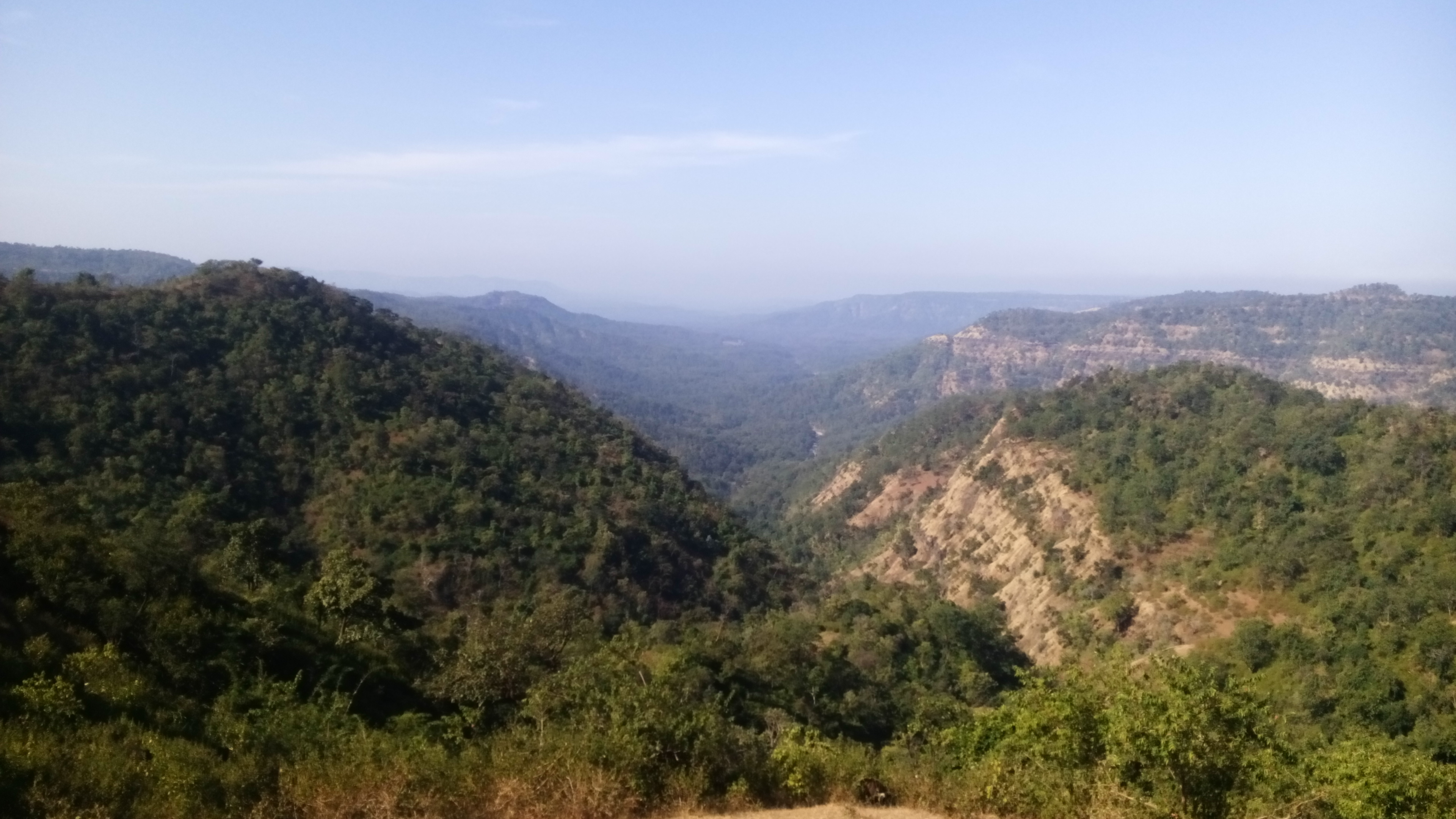
- Top: Muktagiri temples Bottom: Kukru Khamla

- Location of Betul district in Madhya Pradesh
- Coordinates (Betul, Madhya Pradesh): 21°50′N 77°50′E
- Country: India
- State: Madhya Pradesh
- Division: Narmadapuram
- Headquarters: Betul
- Tehsils: 1. Betul, 2. Bhainsdehi, 3. Chicholi, 4. Multai, 5. Shahpur, 6. Amla, 7. Athner, 8. Ghoradongri; 9. Prabhat Pattan; 10. Bhimpur

Area
  - Total: 10,043 km^{2} (3,878 sq mi)

Population (2011)
  - Total: 1,575,362
  - Density: 156.86/km^{2} (406.27/sq mi)

Demographics
  - Literacy: 72.1%
  - Sex ratio: 970
- Time zone: UTC+05:30 (IST)
- Major highways: National Highway 47
- Average annual precipitation: 100-125cm mm
- Website: betul.nic.in

Betul district (Hindi pronunciation: [bɛːt̪uːl]) is a district in the southern part of Madhya Pradesh state in central India. The city of Betul serves as its administrative headquarters. The district is a part of Narmadapuram Division.

The district lies along the Satpura Range bordering the Narmada Valley and Berar Plains. The district has much religious significance, namely the source of the Tapti River at Multai and the Jain temples of Muktagiri.

== History ==
History of Betul traces its origin to Satyug. According to the Skanda Purana, the Tapti River descended to Earth in Satyug to protect the world from excessive heat; therefore, Tapti is also known as Adi Ganga. Moreover, Lord Ram also passed through Betul on his journey to the south. The Pandavas passed through Betul during their Agyaat Vaas in Vidharbha and built a temple of Shiva at Barahling. Between 161 BC and 130 BC, Betul was the kingdom of the Kundala. From the 9th to the 12th century, evidence of Jain history is found in Betul, and its historical evidence can be seen in the Muktagiri group of temples. A copper plate from the Rashtrakutas recording a land grant was found in Multai, dating from the 8th century, showing that they had some control over the area.

At the end of the 13th century, Betul is mentioned again in the biography of Mukund Swami Raj, a revered saint who lived during the time of Raja Jaitpal of Kherla and was sponsored by him.

The founder of Sikhism, Guru Nanak, also visited the holy city and meditated for 15 days in Multai at the origin of the holy Tapti River. According to the historian Firishta, Kherla was part of the Gondwana region and was ruled by Narsingh Rai, who appears to have been a Gond Raja in the 14th century. In 1398, encouraged by the Sultans of Malwa and Khandesh, Narsingh Rai invaded Bahmani territory and devastated the region up to Mahur. In retaliation, the Bahmani Sultan led an expedition against Narsingh Rai seeking tribute. When Narsingh Rai responded defiantly, a battle was fought in which Kherla was defeated. Kherla then became a Bahmani vassal. In 1425, Hoshang Shah of Malwa invaded Kherla but was defeated twice. The third time he invaded, the Kherla ruler did not have time to organise a defence and asked for help from his overlords. Ahmed Shah fought a battle with Hoshang Shah and defeated him. In 1433, Hoshang Shah invaded Kherla again and killed Narsingh Rai, ending his dynasty, and annexed his territory to the Malwa Sultanate.

In 1467, the Nizam-ul-Mulk, Governor of Berar, invaded Kherla again, having been provoked by Malwa's invasion of the Deccan. The Malwa and Bahmani armies fought a large battle, but the Bahmanis won and took Kherla Fort. According to Firishta, the Bahmanis insulted the Kherla defenders, and two Rajput brothers decided to avenge their honour. They pretended to kiss the feet of the governor, snatched swords from the guards, killed the governor, and died defending themselves. In the following negotiations, Kherla was returned to Malwa.

The most popular of the Gond kings was Eel. During the 16th and 17th centuries, Khedla Fort of Betul was continuously invaded by the Mughals. Betul seems to have been part of the Kherla Sarkar of Ellichpur Subah, which also included parts of Chhindwara and Wardha districts. The north of the district was likely forested and did not have much Mughal control.

Bhanwargarh Fort (also locally known as Bhoyargarh or Bhorgarh) is a fort in Betul district, near Shahpur. It is located approximately 14 kilometres (8.7 mi) west of Shahpur town, west of the village of 'Pawar Jhanda'. It was locally known by these names because a Baba (Hindu sant) with a name similar to that of the fort once lived there. Between the 16th and 18th centuries, groups of Panwar Rajputs from Dhar migrated to the fort and later spread to the Betul, Chhindwara, and Pandhurna regions. On arriving in the area, they are said to have settled at Bhanwargarh under the protection of the local Gond rulers, who provided them with shelter. They subsequently came to be known as Bhoyar-Panwars, meaning "Panwars who lived at Bhoyargarh". Over time, the terms Bhoyar, Bhoyar-Panwar, Panwar, Bhoyar-Pawar, and Pawar came to be used synonymously for the same community of Panwar Rajputs.

The remains of the fort are still visible, and its position on a hill gives it a naturally elevated and defensible location.

During the age of Mughal decline, Bakht Buland Shah, ruler of Deogarh, annexed present-day Betul. In the 18th century, the area of Betul was ceded to the Maratha ruler of Berar, Raghavji Bhosale. In 1818 AD, the British-Maratha War was fought at Sitavardi. Under the treaty, the entire area of Betul was given to the British. During the British period, the headquarters of Betul was at Betul Bazar. In 1822, the British shifted the district headquarters to Baddnoor Dhana and made Betul the district headquarters. In earlier times, Betul was called Badnoor. Badd means bad and noor means eye, and so Badnoor means "evil eye". It is said that in old times, criminals were kept at this place after being mutilated. Hence, the name of this place came to be known as Badnoor during the reign of the Gond kings. Initially, Betul was divided into four administrative regions: Bhaggudhana, Chunnidhana, Baddnoordhana, and Tikari.

Betul was described by the British as an area with a wonderful natural environment, and Betul's natural beauty and the high mountain peaks of the Satpura Range mesmerised the British. Hence, Betul was described as a vacation destination for British officials. Betul was going to complete 200 golden years of its establishment in 2022. It was the same year in Shimla, the capital of Himachal Pradesh, that British officer Ross constructed the first British residence, a simple wooden cottage. His successor, Lt. Charles Patt Kennedy, erected the first pucca house in 1822, named after Lt. Kennedy as "Kennedy House" of Shimla. An officer from the Northern Command visited Betul and mentioned Betul and Shimla as the two faces of one coin in his diary. Since then, the unbroken relationship between Shimla and Betul, which was established by the British in the pages of history, continues to this day.

Once, a freedom fighter was hanged in Faasi Mines, and the area around it was subsequently named Fassikhadan. The historic Kamani Gate was part of the Victoria Hostel, built in 1902, where the children of British officers, employees, and merchants were sent to stay for education. The Hindi meaning of Betul is "cottonless". Cotton was not grown in this region of Berar. For this reason, it was named Betul.

Betul is remembered for the Forest Satyagraha that took place in 1930. Ganjan Singh Korku and Banjari Singh Korku were prominent leaders of the movement. During this Satyagraha, mostly Gond and Korku tribals, sometimes under the leadership of Congress leaders and often against their direction, went to forests and cut trees and grass under the control of malguzars.

=== Betul Bazar as old District headquarter ===
Actually, the modern-day Betul town is named after a smaller town named Betul-Bazar, which is 7 km away from Betul. Before 1822, Betul was known as Badnoor, and at that time, the present-day Betul Bazar was holding the original name of Betul, as well as the town held the position of district headquarters. During the British period, the whole district was governed from present-day Betul Bazar. Later, in 1822, the British collector decided to shift the district headquarters from Betul (present-day Betul Bazar) to Badnoor (present-day Betul). At that time, Badnoor was just a small village with very few houses and families, but on the other hand, Betul (present-day Betul Bazar) was a very prosperous and developed town. The intention and reason for shifting the district headquarters are still unclear. The shifting of the district headquarters caused a great loss to Betul (present-day Betul Bazar) and benefited Badnoor. This caused Badnoor to grow rapidly and develop quickly. The name Badnoor was not widely known at that time; hence, people often called it Betul, resulting in confusion. To resolve this confusion, the British officially named it Betul and named the original Betul as Betul Bazar. To this day, the original soul and culture are preserved in Betul Bazar. Despite its small size and congested roads, it holds great significance. It has an enormous number of temples and historical buildings. Each and every brick tells a story of history.

== Geography ==
The Betul District belongs to the Narmadapuram Division of Madhya Pradesh and is situated “between 21° 22’ and 22° 23' N. and 77°10' and 78° 33’ E., on the Satpura plateau. Betul is the most westerly of the four plateau Districts and is bounded on the north by Narmadapuram, on the west by the Districts of Khandwa, Harda and Amravati of Maharashtra, on the south by the Amravati District, and on the east by the Chhindwara District. The District occupies nearly the whole width of the range between the valley of the Narmada on the north and the Berar plains on the south, and with the exception of 15 or 20 villages which lie below the Ghats on the southern border, practically the whole of its area is situated on the plateau. Its shape is very compact, and with the exception of slight projections on the east and west would form almost a complete circle, with the headquarters town of Betul as its centre. Its greatest length from north to south is 106.2 km and its breadth from east to west is 138.4 km. Its area is 10,043 km^{2}.

The mean elevation of the plateau is about 2000 feet, and the surface slopes generally from east to west. With the exception of the small valleys of the Bel and Wardha rivers, the District is drained into the Indian Ocean by the Tapti and the tributaries of the Narmada. Roughly speaking, the northern half is watered by rivers flowing south and west to the Narmada, and the southern half by the Tapti and its affluents. The Bel and Wardha rise on the northern and eastern edges, respectively, of the central plateau and, flowing east and south, join their waters to the Wainganga and ultimately the Godavari, which carries them to the Bay of Bengal. The main chain of the Satpuras, running near the northern borders of the range, reaches its highest point just beyond the north-east corner of the Betul District. Shortly after crossing the border, it is interrupted by the wide valley of the Tawa and its tributaries, the Daryakho and Phophas. Rising again near Shahpur, it runs a few miles due west and breaks off in the hills of Bhorgarh and Jamgarh, which stand above the Morand valley. Thereafter, the backbone of the range, so noticeable further east and north, is lost in a tumbled mass of lower peaks and ridges intersected in all directions by narrow valleys. To the south of the country occupied by the main range and the spurs which it throws off, there lies a wide undulating plateau, covering about half the area of the District, and stretching on the east to the forest-clad gorge of the Wardha River near the Chhindwara border, on the south to the belt of steep hills and deep ravines which mark the final upheaval of the land before it falls to the level of the Berar plains, and on the west to the wild country of Kalibhit and the Melghat, of which a large slice falls within Betul. The District may be described briefly as a central plateau surrounded by a belt of hilly and forest-covered country, wide on the north and west and narrow on the east and south. The rock formation is sandstone in the northern third of the District and elsewhere trap. In the sandstone country, the predominant soil is thin and sandy, and in the trap country, shallow and very stony. The District may thus be broadly divided into three tracts: the sandstone area to the north, the trap plateau in the centre, and the belt of hills, also of basaltic formation, to the south.

A glance at the map will show that the Bel and the Machna rivers, rising close together and flowing, the one due east and the other due west, form a line running nearly due east and west across two-thirds of the width of the District. If this line were continued to the western border, it would approximately mark the boundary between the sandstone formation on the north and the trap on the south. The area included in the former is occupied by the main chain of the Satpuras along the north, and by another distinctly marked range which crosses the main one at right angles at Neempani, going north into the Narmadapuram district and south to Betul, near which town it terminates. In the north-east and north-west of the District lie the valleys of the Tawa and Morand rivers, and further south, the villages on the north bank of the Bel and a part of the valley of the Tawa are included in the sandstone area. About half of the tract thus comprised is covered by forest-clad ranges. In the four large valleys between the hills lies an undulating country intersected by innumerable watercourses and covered principally with a thin sandy soil. Many kinds of forest trees grow to perfection, and among them several which bear valuable flowers or fruit, such as the mahua (Bassia latifolia), harra (Terminalia chebula) and achar (Buchanania latifolia). These trees are now protected by law, and it has always been the custom to spare them from the axe when clearing land for cultivation, so that the malguzari lands are thickly dotted with fine trees. In the rains, when the ground is green with young crops or grass and the trees are in full leaf, the clumps of mahua and harra lend the country a singular resemblance to an English park.

The central trap plateau contains villages of every grade from the best to the poorest conceivable, and indeed, except in the valley of the Tapti, which cuts a deep groove through the southern part of the plateau, and on the steep sides of some of the small hills which run here and there across its face, mangoes by the wells are almost the only trees to be seen. The most fertile tracts are the small plain containing about 50 villages immediately around the central plateau, Betul, and the valleys of the Ambhora and Tapti to the south of the Multai tahsil, in which eighty or ninety villages are situated. The whole of the Betul plain and the greater part of the other areas are covered with black soil. Towards the east, the elevation rises about 400 feet to the plain on which the town of Multai stands, sinking again further to the south and west. Here the surface is formed of a rolling stony plateau intersected by numerous narrow valleys. Every village has a black-soil valley of greater or less extent, but the proportion of fertile land is usually small, except where a large stream winds through the stony hills, as at Jawalkheda, Bhainsdehi and Athner, and stretches measuring some thousands of acres are found. The whole plateau is blessed with an excellent water supply, generally at small depth from the surface, and wells are numerous, especially in the villages round Betul and the higher parts of the Multai plateau. Many of the small streams contain running water until the end of the cold weather, and there are four or five perennial rivers. The poorer parts of the plateau, owing to the lack of trees and the terribly stony character of the soil, present, except in the rains, a very barren and unpromising appearance, in strong contrast to the valleys filled with wheat and sugarcane, and one wonders that such apparently useless soil should have been taken up for cultivation; but these uplands, with a normal rainfall and frequent resting fallows, will grow fair crops of jawar, oilseeds and the lesser millets, and are by no means so valueless as they appear when not under crop. Large villages are fairly numerous in this section of the District, and the best parts of the plateau are thickly populated.

On all sides except the north, the plateau is hemmed in by a border of trap hills forming the southern range of the Satpuras and leading down to the Berar plains. On the east, the hills form a narrow belt through which the Wardha runs in a deep gorge. On the south, too, the belt of hilly country is narrow at its east end, south of Prabhat Pattan, but widens towards the west till, at the south-west corner of the District, it measures about fifteen miles from north to south. The formation of the hills in this part of the District is curious, the sides being exceedingly precipitous, often nearly perpendicular for 500 feet or more, and the valleys narrow, while the tops of the hills are broad and flat. In the west, the Khamla plateau affords sufficient culturable land to support a block of ten or fifteen villages, but elsewhere the village lands are much scattered, lying in small narrow valleys running up into the hills from the Berars and in a narrow strip of level land lying between the foothills and the border. The greater part of the area has been reserved as Government forest, but the flat tops of all the larger hills have been cultivated for many years and support some considerable villages. The soil is shallow and stony, and cotton and juar are the crops principally grown. On the west, the forest-covered valley of the Tapti projects between the harda and Amravati Districts in an oblong some fifteen miles wide by twenty long. The whole area is a confused mass of small hills and valleys and is nearly all under reserved forest. The malguzari villages lie generally in the narrow strip of level land to the south bank of the Tapti and in a tract of undulating land to the north-east where the trap formation merges into sandstone.

The elevation of the plain portion of the District rises from about 1500 feet in the extreme north and north-west to about 2200 feet on the Betul plateau. Betul is 2173 feet high and Betul Bazar 2189. The Multai plateau to the east is about 400 feet higher, Multai itself, which is situated on the division of the watershed and is therefore one of the highest points, being 2526 feet above sea level. From here the plateau slopes to the south, but not to a very large extent. The general slope of the surface is from east to west, and in some portions of the west of the District the elevation sinks to 1500 feet. The highest points are found in the hills of the extreme south-west, where the village of Antarmal has an elevation of 3540 feet and the Khamla plateau of 3789. The peaks in the north are usually between 2000 and 2500 feet in elevation, but the large mass of Bhanwargarh (Bhoyargarh/Bhorgarh) runs up to 2930 feet and Narwargarh to 2570, while the hill of Chikhlar near Betul is 2588 feet high. The Kilendeo hill in the north-east of the Multai tahsil is 3430 feet in elevation.

Rising among the western spurs of the Satpura range, the river flows for a short distance over the level plateau of the Betul District in a shallow channel, which in the hot season forms a chain of silent pools fringed by great koha trees, and by the thick green cover of jamun and karonda in which tigers delight to dwell. The surrounding country in this part of its course is partially cleared and cultivated with rice and sugarcane. Presently, however, it commences its descent towards the level of the lower plains, plunging into a glen river through the basalt, and assumes the character of a mountain torrent. Here and there it widens out into little bays of level valley land, but is henceforth, for a hundred miles or so, generally shut in by high banks rising from the edge of its channel. Through these, the rapid drainage of the higher hills has cut innumerable narrow ravines down to the level of its bed, which spread out into an interminable series of rocky gullies. The surface of these tracts has been weathered in places into a penurious soil, leaving multitudes of round black boulders of trap, ranging in size from an egg to a small house, and salted over with small white agate splinters, both apparently eliminated from the mother rock in the process of decomposition. This surface is covered with a growth of coarse grass, varying according to the depth of the soil from a few inches to several feet in height, and is studded with small trees, of which ninety-nine in every hundred are the sateh or frankincense tree (Boswellia serrata). The aspect of these vast forests of the Boswellia, of which the country about the Tapti is a specimen, and which cover, I should say, fully one half of the whole of this trap region, is very remarkable. During the height of the monsoon, the grass is green, and the trees have thrown out a thin foliage of small bright-green pinnated leaves. The river beds, too, are then filled by foaming torrents, and the fervour of the sun is moderated by a canopy of grey clouds. But gradually, as the clouds clear off and the rain ceases, a change occurs. The rivers shrink in their beds, till a trickling stream in a wide expanse of boulders represents the resistless mountain torrent of a month before, while the higher gullies are utterly dried up. The grass turns from green to yellow and bristles with a terrible armature of prickles, like needles of steel with the barbs of a fish-hook, which, catching each other and matting together into masses.

Betul district, situated in the heart of India, has the distinction of being the place of origin of the holy rivers Tapti and Wardha. Situated at the focal point of Akhand Bharat, this district shelters the tribal culture. This tribal-dominated district is situated between the Satpura hills and the Berar plains in the south.

== Forests and wildlife ==
Betul is covered with a huge amount of forest, which are usually dry deciduous forests. Being one of the most forest rich district of Madhya Pradesh, the district has enormous potential of forest produce and wildlife. The district is an intersection of two of the national parks, namely Satpuda National Park and Melghat Tiger Reserve. the district serves as a buffer and a migration corridor to the wildlife. The forest is specially composed of Teak and Sal trees, two of the most used timber in India.

Betul district have a wide range of wildlife and some of them are very rare or even endangered species.

- Cheetal
- Sambhar
- Sloth bear
- Jaguar
- Gaur bison
- Monitor lizard
- Leopard
- Tiger
- Langoor
- Wild dog
- Wild boar
- ghariyal

== Focal point of undivided India - Barsali ==
Surveys conducted before 1947 shows that Barsali, a village in Betul district was founded as the focal point of undivided India. A railway station in situated in the village which is exactly to be considered the focal point of undivided India. Many tourist visit the village only to experience the presence on such spot which is holding such significance. However, there is nothing other than this point in this place.

== Ancient rock shelters - Ambadevi ==
The Ambadevi rock shelters are part of an extensive cave site, where the oldest yet known traces of human life in the central province of the Indian subcontinent were discovered. The site is located in the Satpura Range of the Gawilgarh Hills in Betul District of the Indian state of Madhya Pradesh, north of Dharul village in Amravati district of Maharashtra. Studies of various rock paintings and petroglyphs present in the caves suggest, that the Ambadevi rock shelters were inhabited by prehistoric human settlers since around 25,000 years ago. First discoveries of clusters of numerous rock shelters and caves were made by Vijay Ingole and his team beginning on 27 January 2007.

Named after the nearby ancient Ambadevi Cave Temple, the site has also been referred to as the Satpura-Tapti valley caves and the Gavilgarh-Betul rock shelters. The Ambadevi rock shelters rank among the most important archaeological discoveries of the early 21st Century in India, on par with the 20th Century discovery of the Bhimbetka rock shelters.

== Demographics ==
Historical population
Year	Pop.	±% p.a.
1901	287,807	—
1911	390,386	+3.10%
1921	363,737	−0.70%
1931	406,252	+1.11%
1941	438,342	+0.76%
1951	451,655	+0.30%
1961	560,412	+2.18%
1971	736,196	+2.77%
1981	925,387	+2.31%
1991	1,181,501	+2.47%
2001	1,395,175	+1.68%
2011	1,575,362	+1.22%

According to the 2011 census Betul district has a population of 1,575,362, roughly equal to the nation of Gabon or the US state of Idaho. This gives it a ranking of 314th in India (out of a total of 640). The district has a population density of 157 inhabitants per square kilometre (410/sq mi). Its population growth rate over the decade 2001–2011 was 6.85%. Betul has a sex ratio of 970 females for every 1000 males, and a literacy rate of 70.14%. 19.62% of the population lives in urban areas. Scheduled Castes and Scheduled Tribes made up 10.11% and 42.34% of the population respectively.

The district has an area of 10,043 km^{2} (3,878 sq mi).

=== Religion ===
Religions in Betul district (2011)
Religion	Percent
Hinduism	95.58%
Islam	2.39%
Other (tribal religion)	0.83%
Buddhism	0.61%
Other or not stated	0.59%

Hindus are by far the most numerous with 95.58% and Muslims are 2.39%. Those from tribal religions are 0.83%, while Buddhists who were 9,600 in number.

=== Languages ===
Languages of Betul district (2011)
1. Hindi (44.7%)
2. Gondi (27.7%)
3. Marathi (12.9%)
4. Korku (11.1%)
5. Bengali (1.69%)
6. Others (1.94%)

At the time of the 2011 Census of India, 44.69% of the population in the district spoke Hindi, 27.69% Gondi, 12.86% Marathi, 11.13% Korku and 1.69% Bengali as their first language. The local Hindi dialect is close to Nimadi with some influence from Marathi and Bundeli. The Bhoyari-Pawari dialect of the Rajasthani-Malvi language is spoken exclusively by the people of the Kshatriya Pawar (Bhoyar-Pawar) caste. Hindi is spoken throughout the district, especially in Multai and Amla tehsils, while Gondi is a majority or significant minority in Chicholi, Shahpur, Ghoda Dongri, Bhainsdehi and Athner tehsils. Marathi is spoken in the southern part of the district bordering Maharashtra.

Main tribes inhabiting the district are Gonds and Korkus. The remaining population are castes like Kshatriya Pawar (Bhoyar-Pawar), Rajput, Raghuvanshi (Raghvi), Brahmin, Maratha, Chamar, Mali, Pal, Patil, Kalwar, Kurmi, Kunbi, Dholewar and Soni.

== Tourist attractions ==
Major Tourist Attraction of Betul District :-

- Muktagiri - Muktagiri is a major Jain area, with many prominent Jain temples known for their architecture and spirituality.
- Kukru - Khamla - Kukru Khamla is a major hill station and tourist destination of Betul district, it is very popular among tourists for its coffee plantations, sunset and windmills.
- Multai - Multai is known for the origin of the Tapti River and the temple of Maa Tapti.
- Salbardi - Salbardi is a very popular place in Betul district, it is known for its cave temple dedicated to Lord Shiva.
- Balajipuram - Balajipuram is a major temple located near Betul which is very popular for its architecture and religious and spiritual significance.

== Education ==
- Kendriya Vidyalaya, Betul
- Jawahar Navodaya Vidyalaya, Betul
- Little Flower Senior Secondary School, Betul
- R D Public School, Kalapatha, Betul
- Satpuda Valley Public School, Sonaghati, Betul
- ELC English School, Betul
- Rathore College and School, Betul
- Government Jaywanti Haksar Post Graduate College, Betul
- Government Polytechnic College, Betul
- Shri Ram Pharmacy College, Jamthi, Betul
- Institute of Computer Science and Technology, Sadar Betul
- H.L. Agrawal B.Ed. College, Betul
- Shri Balaji Institute of Technology & Management, Betul
- Government Girls College, Betul
- Government Industrial Training Institute, Betul

== Transport ==
Betul railway station is a major railway station of its District, located between Bhopal and Nagpur station.

== Economy ==
Betul is the fastest developing district of Madhya Pradesh according to ministry of statics. Betul is emeriging as an example of development from bottom to top .As in 2006 the Ministry of Panchayati Raj named Betul one of the country's 250 most backward districts (out of a total of 640). It was one of the 24 districts in Madhya Pradesh previously receiving funds from the Backward Regions Grant Fund Programme (BRGF).But today Betul has successfully achieved the title of one of the fastest emerging district in the central zone.
