= Pipla Narayanwar =

Town in Madhya Pradesh

Piplanarayanwar
- Town
- Location in Madhya Pradesh, India
- Coordinates: 21.59°N 78.73°E
- Country: India
- State: Madhya Pradesh
- District: Chhindwara

Government
  - Type: Nagar Panchayat

Population (2011)
  - Total: 8,595
- Vehicle registration: MP 28

Piplanarayanwar is a Nagar Panchayat city in district of Chhindwara in Madhya Pradesh. Jam River flows near the Town. 480109 is the pin code of Piplanarayanwar.

== Geography ==
Piplanarayanwar is located in the Satpura range. Piplanarayanwar is located at 21.59°N 78.73°E. It has an average elevation of 508 metres (1669 feet).

== Demographics ==
Piplanarayanwar Town has a population of 8,595 of which 4,402 are males while 4,193 are females as Census India 2011.

== See also ==
- Pandhurna District
- Sausar
