= Bharhka =

Bharhka is an ancient village, at Rangri, located near Sarsai, on the Rangri road, midway between Kullu and Manali, overlooking the Pir Panjal mountains of the middle Himalayas, India. It is a 15-minute drive from the ancient capital of the Kullu district, Naggar (Himachal Pradesh), India. Gauri Shankar Temple, Dashal, is said to have been built by the Pandavas and is at 10-minute walking distance from Bharhka.

This Bharhka region is known for its agricultural production, especially for the royal apple, santa rosa plum and lettuce. Terrace farming is a form of production used in the area, with chief crops including: maize, rice, wheat, and Zaatu Chaawal, a variety of rice that is golden brown in color.

The Hindu temple of Devi of Bharhka (Lord Durga) is located near Bharhka.
