= Kanhan =

Kanhan may refer to:

- Kanhan River in India
- Kanhan (Pipri), a town in India
