= G H Raisoni University =

Private university in Madhya Pradesh, India

- Type: Private
- Established: June 13, 2016
- Parent institution: Raisoni Group of Institutions
- Accreditation: UGC
- Chancellor: Sunil Raisoni
- Vice-Chancellor: Meena Rajesh
- Faculty: 15
- Location: Dhoda Borgaon, Pandhurna, Madhya Pradesh, India; 21.519°N 78.761°E
- Campus: Rural
- Website: ghru.edu.in/saikheda/

G H Raisoni University is a private university located in the village Dhoda Borgaon in Pandhurna district, Madhya Pradesh, India. The university was established in 2016 by the GHR Sons Educational and Medical Research Foundation through Madhya Pradesh Niji Vishwavidyalay (Sthapana Ewam Sanchalan) Sanshodhan Adhyadesh, 2016, an Ordinance which also established Symbiosis University of Applied Sciences and the yet to be operational (as of April 2018) D.C. University. It is part of the Raisoni Group of Institutions (RGI).

== Institutions ==
- School of Engineering & Technology
- School of Sciences
- School of Pharmacy
- School of Agricultural Sciences
- School of Commerce And Management
- School of Law
- School of Arts
- School of Liberal Arts
