= LDE (disambiguation) =

LDE may refer to:

== Transport ==
- LADE, Argentine airline (ICAO:LDE)
- Leipzig-Dresdner Eisenbahn-Compagnie, German rail company
- Lodhikheda railway station, India (IR code:LDE)
- Tarbes–Lourdes–Pyrénées Airport, France (IATA:LDE)

== Other uses ==
- Liberali Democratici Europei, an Italian political party
- Long delayed echo, in two-way radio
- LDE(x), in computing
- Linear differential equation, in mathematics
