= Ramkona =

Village in Pandhurna District

- Village
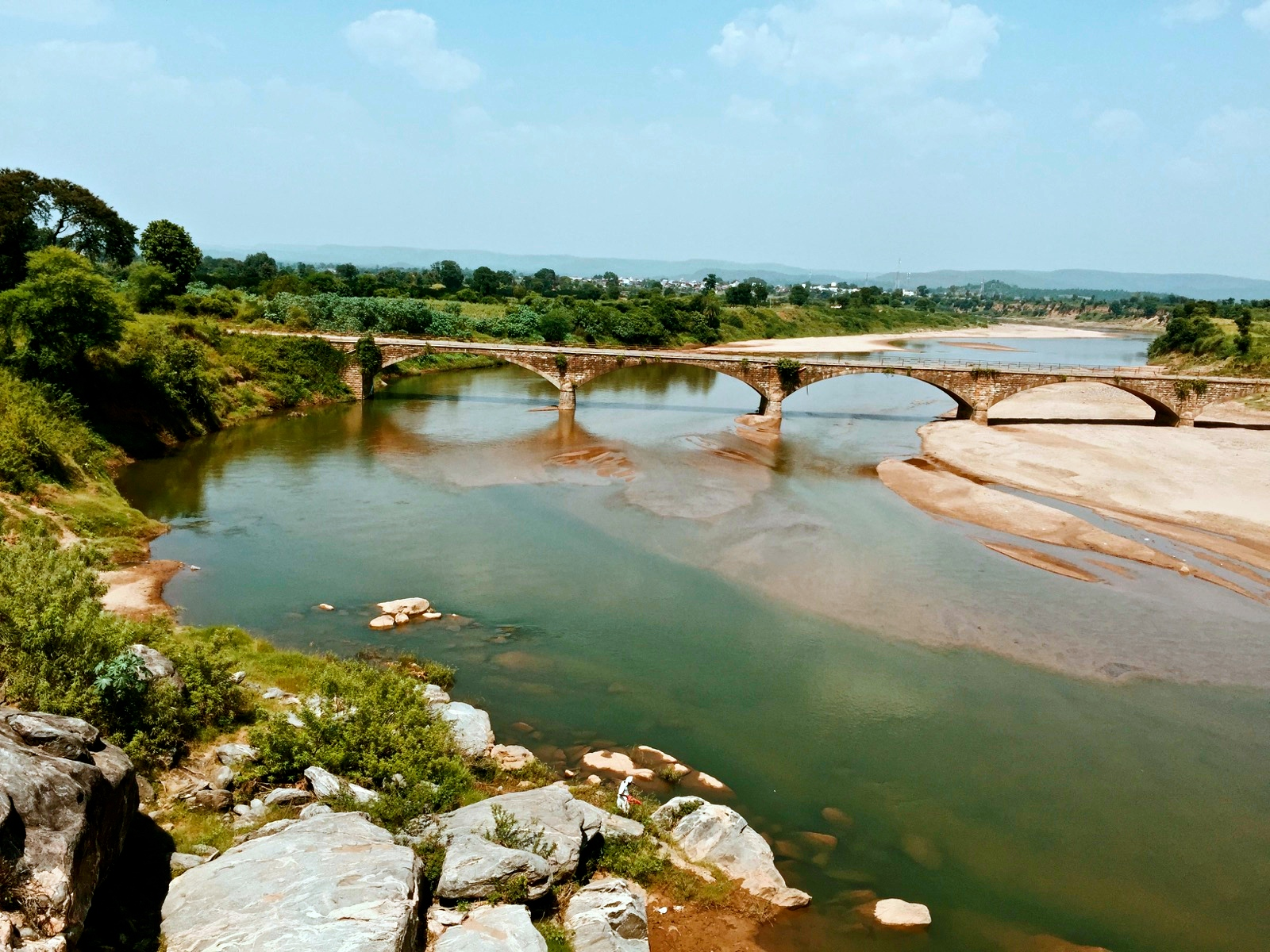
- Kanhan River in Ramkona
- Country: India
- State: Madhya Pradesh
- District: Pandhurna

Government
  - Type: Gram Panchayat

Population (2011)
  - Total: 6,144
- Vehicle registration: MP 28

Ramakona is a town located in Pandhurna District of Madhya Pradesh.

== Geography ==
Ramkona is located on banks of Kanhan River. It's 11 km away from Sausar. 480106 is pin code of Ramkona.

== Demographics ==
Ramkona's population is 6,144 of which 3120 are males while 3024 are females according to India's 2011 census and has 1394 families residing there.

== Transportation ==
Ramkona is well connected with roadways and railway. The Ramkona railway station code is 'RMO'.

Ramkona is located on NH-547 connecting Ramkona to Nagpur, Narsinghpur, Chhindwara, Saoner, Sausar, and Amarwada.
