= Borgaon, Madhya Pradesh =

Town in Madhya Pradesh in India

Borgaon
- Census town
- Location in Madhya Pradesh
- Coordinates: 21.55°N 78.81°E
- Country: India
- State: Madhya Pradesh
- District: Pandhurna

Government
  - Type: Gram Panchayat
  - Body: Gram Panchayat
- Elevation: 360 m (1,180 ft)

Population (2011)
  - Total: 7,497

Languages
  - Official: Hindi
- Time zone: UTC+5:30 (IST)
- PIN: 480106
- Vehicle registration: MP-28
- Nearest city: Nagpur
- Literacy: 87%
- Vidhan Sabha constituency: Sausar
- Climate: Healthy (Köppen)

Borgaon (Village ID 495334) is a Census town in Pandhurna District of Madhya Pradesh in India. Its located on Chhindwara Nagpur road.

== Geography ==
Borgaon is located on 21.55°N 78.81°E.It has an average elevation of 360 metres (1184 feet).

== Demographics ==
Borgaon Town has population of 7,497 of which 3,943 are males while 3,554 are females as Census India 2011. Literacy rate of Borgaon city is 90.08%

== Industries ==
Borgaon is home to numerous industries after the arrival of Raymond textiles in Borgaon in the 1990s, since then the industrial area called AKVN Borgaon-khairitaigaon (Audyogik Kendra Vikas Nigam) (Industrial center development Corporation) has seen a number of small and large industries.

== Education ==
- G H Raisoni University, private university near Borgaon

== Transport ==
Borgaon is located on Nagpur-Sausar-Chhindwara Road so it is well connected with a bus service. Borgaon is 60 km away from Nagpur.
