= Teegaon =

- village
- Location in Madhya Pradesh, India Teegaon (India)
- Coordinates: 21°38′36″N 78°27′34″E
- Country: India
- State: Madhya Pradesh
- District: Pandhurna District

Government
  - Type: Gram Parishad
  - Body: Gram Panchayat Teegaon
  - Sarpanch: Domuji Warthi

Area
  - Total: 7.2 km^{2} (2.8 sq mi)
- Elevation: 484 m (1,588 ft)

Population (2011)
  - Total: 7,785
  - Density: 1,100/km^{2} (2,800/sq mi)

Language
  - Official: Hindi
- Time zone: UTC+5:30 (IST)
- PIN: 480338
- Telephone code: +07164
- Vehicle registration: MP-28
- Sex ratio: 942/1000 ♂/♀

Teegaon is a Gram Panchayat village in Pandhurna Tehsil of Pandhurna district in the Indian state of Madhya Pradesh. Muka Baba is a local folk deity worshipped in Teegaon village in the Chhindwara district of Madhya Pradesh, India. The shrine of Muka Baba is an important religious place for the people of Teegaon and nearby villages. Devotees believe that Muka Baba protects the village and fulfills the wishes of those who pray with faith.

History and Beliefs

According to local traditions and oral stories, Muka Baba is believed to have been a spiritual figure or saint associated with the village in earlier times. Over the years, the place connected with him became a sacred site where villagers began offering prayers. Although there are no detailed written historical records, the belief in Muka Baba has been passed down through generations.

Temple and Worship

A small temple or shrine dedicated to Muka Baba is located in Teegaon village. Local residents regularly visit the shrine to pray for health, prosperity, and protection. Special prayers and offerings are made by villagers during important occasions and festivals.

Cultural Significance

Muka Baba holds a special place in the cultural and spiritual life of the village. Many people from surrounding areas also visit the shrine, especially during local religious gatherings. The site is considered a symbol of faith and unity among the villagers.

== Geography ==
It is located 79 kilometres west of the district headquarters, Chhindwara, 8 km from Pandhurna, and 244 km from the state capital, Bhopal. Teegaon is on the border of the Chhindwara District and Nagpur District and near the Maharashtra state border. It is the 26th biggest village by area in the sub district. Meanwhile, 0.04 square kilometer (1%) of the village is covered by forest.

== Economy ==
Teegaon's economy is based mainly upon Agriculture. The village has a post office and a branch of Allahabad Bank. It has a primary school, several convents and a high school.

== Transport ==
Teeagon is on the Nagpur-Bhopal Highway (NH47). The nearest railway station is within the village. The nearest airport is Dr. Babasaheb Ambedkar International Airport, Nagpur (87.4 km) and RAJABHOJ international Airport, Bhopal (253.1 km).

== Demographics ==
The native language of Teegaon is Hindi and most of the village people either communicate using Hindi and Marathi.

Census Parameter	Data
Total Population	7785
Total No of Houses	1732
Female Population %	48.5% ( 3773)
Total Literacy rate %	70.4% ( 5482)
Working Population %	46.1%

== Politics ==
Village Teegaon has a Gram Panchayat, whose Sarpach is Domuji Warthi. Teegaon Lies in Pandhurna Assembly constituency, whose MLA is Nilesh Pusaram Uikey. It lies in Chhindwara Parliamentary constituency whose MP is Nakul Kamal Nath.
