= Kolar River (Kanhan) =

River in India

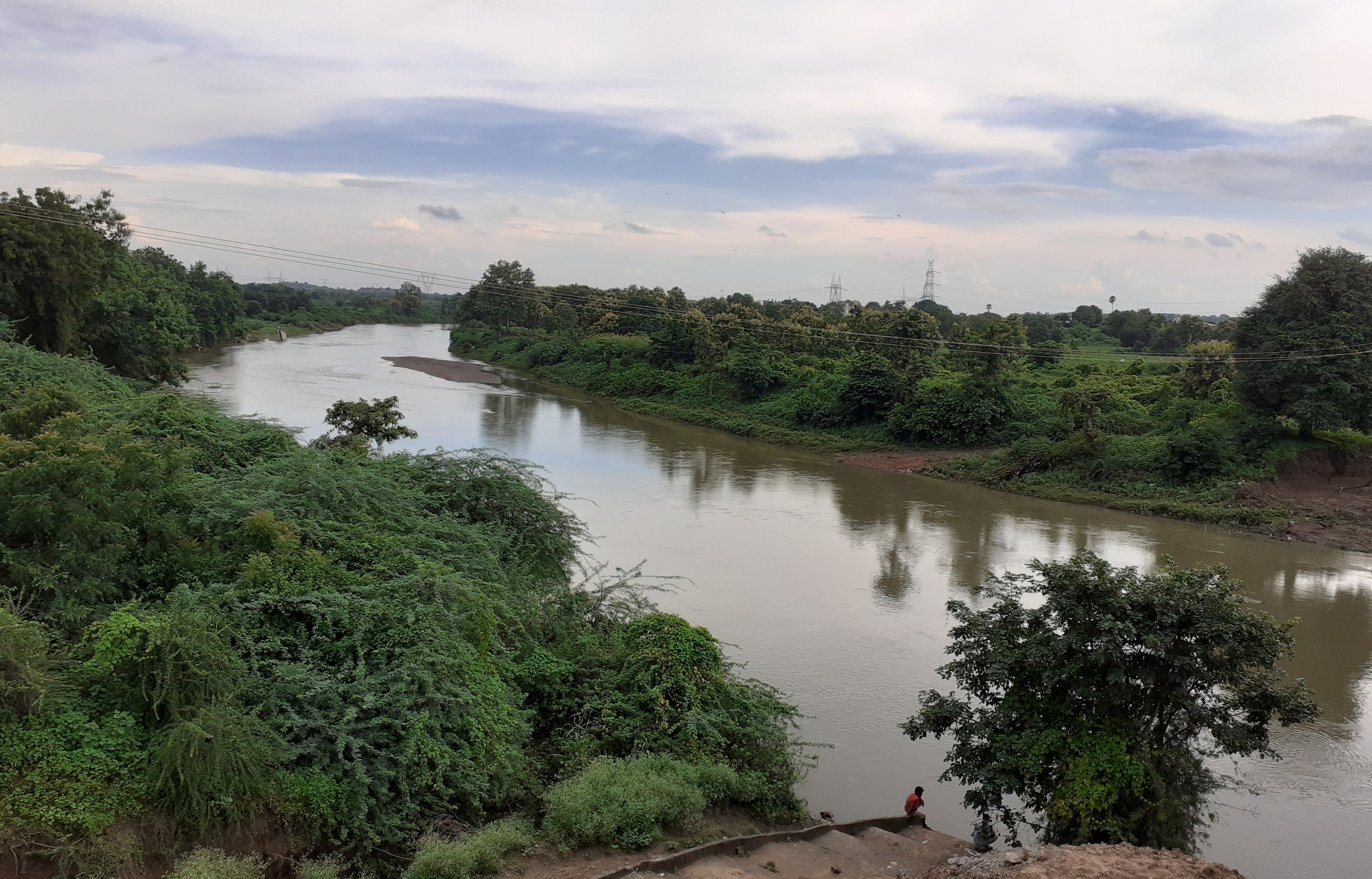
- Kolar river near Koradi

The Kolar River (Kolhar River) is a river of Nagpur district, Maharashtra, India, flowing southeast from above the town of Saoner to its juncture with the Kanhan River. It is in the Godavari river basin. The Kolar River forms the boundary between Saoner taluka and Ramtek taluka.

== Origin and course ==
The Kolar arises near the Madhya Pradesh border in the Chorkhairi West Reserved Forest in the north-east corner of the Katol taluka at an elevation of approximately 600 meters, 21°28′01″N 78°39′52″E. It flows southeast for about ten kilometers passing through the Pilkapar range and then past the village of Pipla on its right. The river then turns east for four kilometers toward the village of Tidangi, where it enters the Kolar Dam Reservoir. Past the Kolar Dam it continues east for about four kilometers before turning southeast again just before the village of Hetisurla. Another seven kilometers brings the Kolar River to the center of the town of Saoner (Savner). It continues southeast past the town of Patansavangi, and receives it major tributary, the Chandrabhaga Nadi, from the right (west) at 21°19′24″N 79°01′11″E. Continuing southeast it enters the Kanhan River from the right at the village of Tola, 21°14′58″N 79°09′29″E, just above the town of Kamptee. The entire course of the river is in Nagpur district.
