= Malvi language =

Indo-Aryan language from Malwa, India

Malvi
- माळवी
- Native to: India
- Region: Malwa region (parts of Madhya Pradesh and Rajasthan)
- Native speakers: 5.4 million (2011 census)
- Language family: Indo-European: Indo-Iranian; Indo-Aryan; Western; Rajasthani; Malvi
- Writing system: Devanagari

Language codes
- ISO 639-3: mup
- Glottolog: malv1243 Malvi

Malvi or Malwi (माळवी भाषा) is an Indo-Aryan language spoken primarily in the Malwa region of India, particularly in Madhya Pradesh and parts of Rajasthan. It is a dialect of the Rajasthani language. About 75% of the Malvi population can converse in Hindi, which is the official language of Madhya Pradesh. The literacy rate in Hindi is approximately 40% among Malvi speakers. Many unpublished works of Malvi literature have been created over the years, with limited mainstream recognition.

== Writing system ==
In India, Malvi is written in the Devanagari script, an abugida which is written from left to right. Earlier, the Mahajani script, or Modiya, was used to write Rajasthani. The script is also called Maru Gurjari in a few records.

== Dialects ==
- Malvi
  - Ujjani (Ujjain, Dhar, Indore, Dewas, Shajapur, Sehore, and Agar Malwa districts): Ujjani is a prestige dialect of the Malvi language.
  - Dashori (Mandsaur, Neemuch, and parts of Ratlam and Pratapgarh districts): Dashori is a dialect of Malvi influenced by Mewari and Marwari.
  - Rajawadi parts of (Ratlam, Dhar, and Ujjain districts):
  - Umathwadi (Rajgarh district): Umathwadi is a variety of Malvi with some features of Hadauti.
  - Sondhwadi (Jhalawar district, Ujjain, and Agar Malwa): Sondhwadi is spoken in these areas.
  - Rangri: Rangri is spoken by the Rajputs of Malwa and is similar in sound to the Dashori dialect.
  - Bhoyari/Pawari (Betul, Chhindwara, Pandhurna, and Wardha districts): Bhoyari/Pawari is spoken exclusively by the people of the Bhoyar-Pawar caste. Their original home was Malwa before they migrated to the Betul, Chhindwara, Pandhurna, and Wardha regions.

== Some sample translations ==
Standard Rajasthani (Marwari)	Ujjani	Dashori	Rajwadi	Sondhwadi	Umathwadi	Meaning
अठै (atthai)	अंई (aeen)	अटे (atte)	यां (yaan)	अंई (aeen)	इनंग (inang)	Here
वठै/उठै (vatthai/utthai)	वंई (vaeen)	वटे (vatte)	वां (vaan)	वंई (vaeen)	उनंग (unang)	There
कोनी (koni)	नी(nee)	कोनी(koni)	कोनी (koni)	कोनी (koni)	नी (नी)	No
आवैलो/आवैली (availo/availi)	आवेगो/आवेगी (avego/avegi)	आवेगा/आवेगा (avega/avega) neutral in this condition	आवेगा/आवेगा (avega/avega)	आवेगा/आवेगा (avega/avega)	आवेगो/आवेगी (avego/avegi)	Will come
