= Patansavangi =

Village in Maharashtra

Patansavangi Patansaongi, Patansawagi
- town
- Location in Maharashtra, India Patansavangi (India)
- Coordinates: 21°19′38″N 079°01′19″E
- Country: India
- State: Maharashtra
- District: Nagpur district
- Taluka: Saoner

Languages
  - Official: Marathi
- Time zone: UTC+5:30 (IST)
- PIN: 441113

Patansavangi (Patansaongi, Patansawagi) is a panchayat village in Maharashtra State, India. Administratively, Patansavangi is under the Saoner Taluk of Nagpur District in Maharashtra, although earlier (1908) it had been part of the larger Ramtek taluka. It lies on the left (east) bank of the Kolar River, just upstream from its confluence with the Chandrabhaga Nadi. Patansavangi is 13 km by road southeast of the town of Saoner (Savner) and 25 km by road northwest of the town of Nagpur.

There are three villages in the Patansawagi gram panchayat: Patansavangi, Bidkawadas and Kawadas.

Patansavangi is the site of a Gondi fort dating from the 16th century. In 1742 there was a massacre at the fort of Gondi people who resisted Raghoji I Bhonsle, with a death toll of up to 12,000.
