= Pandhurna Assembly constituency =

Constituency of the Madhya Pradesh legislative assembly in India

Coordinates: 21.59°N 78.53°E

Pandhurna
- Constituency No. 128 for the Madhya Pradesh Legislative Assembly

Constituency details
- Country: India
- Region: Central India
- State: Madhya Pradesh
- District: Pandhurna
- Lok Sabha constituency: Chhindwara
- Established: 1967
- Reservation: ST

Member of Legislative Assembly
- 16th Madhya Pradesh Legislative Assembly
- Incumbent Neelesh Pusaram Uikey
- Party: Indian National Congress
- Elected year: 2023
- Preceded by: Jatan Uikey

Pandhurna is one of the 230 Vidhan Sabha (Legislative Assembly) constituencies of Madhya Pradesh state in central India.

== Overview ==
It is part of Pandhurna district. Its covered all Pandhurna tehsil and Pandhurna municipality.

== Members of the Legislative Assembly ==
Election	Name	Party
1967	Madhav Lal Dubey	Indian National Congress
1972	Madhav Lal Dubey	Indian National Congress
1977	Madhav Lal Dubey	Indian National Congress
1980	Madhav Lal Dubey	Indian National Congress
1985	Marotrao Khawse	Independent
1990	Marotrao Khawse	Bharatiya Janata Party
1993	Chander Shekhar Sanbartod	Indian National Congress
1998	Suresh Zalke	Indian National Congress
2003	Marotrao Khawse	Bharatiya Janata Party
2008	Ramrao Kavdeti	Bharatiya Janata Party
2013	Jatan Uikey	Indian National Congress
2018	Neelesh Pusaram Uikey	Indian National Congress
2023	Neelesh Pusaram Uikey	Indian National Congress

== Election results ==
=== 2023 ===
2023 Madhya Pradesh Legislative Assembly election: Pandhurna
Party	Candidate	Votes	%	±%
INC	Neelesh Pusaram Uikey	90,944	49.01	+0.84
BJP	Prakash Uikey	80,487	43.37	+8.03
GGP	Sunil Ratiram Erpachi	5,069	2.73	+0.19
Independent	Wasudeo Kumre	1,802	0.97	
Independent	Gondiya Bhalavi	1,722	0.93	
NOTA	None of the above	3,267	1.76	−0.78
Majority		10,457	5.64	−7.19
Turnout		185,579	86.6	+1.91
INC hold		Swing		

=== 2018 ===
2018 Madhya Pradesh Legislative Assembly election: Pandhurna
Party	Candidate	Votes	%	±%
INC	Neelesh Pusaram Uikey	80,125	48.17	
BJP	Tikaram Korachi	58,776	35.34	
Independent	Jitendra Uikey	6,593	3.96	
GGP	Madanlal Batti	4,230	2.54	
BSP	Jagdish Uikey	3,139	1.89	
Independent	Ramrao Kavdeti	2,615	1.57	
Independent	Shubhash Kumre	1,998	1.2	
AAP	Arvind Masram	1,985	1.19	
NOTA	None of the above	4,224	2.54	
Majority		21,349	12.83	
Turnout		166,339	84.69	
INC hold		Swing		

=== 2013 ===
2013 Madhya Pradesh Legislative Assembly election: Pandhurna
Party	Candidate	Votes	%	±%
INC	Jatan Uikey	61,741	42.46	
BJP	Tikaram Korachi	60263	41.44	
GGP	Prahlad Sing Kushre	3547	2.44	
BSP	Jagdish Uikey	3271	2.25	
Independent	Suresh Uikey	2740	1.88	N/A
Independent	Sunil Marskole	2217	1.52	
SS	Arun Evanati	1846	1.27	
Independent	Shivaji Varkade	1282	0.88	
Independent	Rampyari Dewram Saryam	1155	0.79	
Independent	Shailendra Uikey	1036	0.71	
Independent	Ramsing Birju Uikey	931	0.64	
Independent	Rameshvar Sirsam	781	0.54	
Independent	Dr. Babulal Khandate	359	0.25	
NOTA	None of the Above	4251	2.92	
Majority				
Turnout		145420	81.21	
Swing to INC from BJP		Swing		

== See also ==
- Pandhurna
