= Damua =

- town
- Location in Madhya Pradesh, India Damua (India)
- Coordinates: 22.2164°N 78.4804°E
- Country: India
- State: Madhya Pradesh
- District: Chhindwara

Population (2011)
  - Total: 15,856

Languages
  - Official: Hindi
- Time zone: UTC+5:30 (IST)
- Postal code: 480555
- ISO 3166 code: IN-MP
- Vehicle registration: MP

Damua is a Nagar Parishad in Chhindwara district in the state of Madhya Pradesh, India.

== Demographics ==
As of 2011 India census, Damua Municipality has population of 24,663. Males constitute 52% of the population and females 48%. Damua has an average literacy rate of 73%, higher than the national average of 59.5%: male literacy is 79% and, female literacy is 66%. In Damua, 10% of the population is under 6 years of age.

Damua has now declared as a new municipality in Chhindwara. Damua is a basically divided in three parts.

1. Nandan (Kalichhapar)
2. Nandora
3. Chikatbary

Schools in Damua and Nandan

1. Govt Higher Secondary School, Nandan.
2. Govt boys school, Damua.
3. Govt Girls school, Damua.
4. L.B.S High school English medium Nandan.

Nearest park and hill station from Damua.

1. Satpuda national park.(panchmarhi). Panchmarhi Satpuda park.
2. Pench national park (Seoni, Chhindwara)

== Geography ==
Damua is located on 22.2164°N 78.4804°E. Kanhan River is flow's near the town. Damua is a town situated in the dense hills of Satpura near the coal field of Pench Kanhan.

== Media ==
Newspapers: Damua's local News paper is Khan Majdoor Chhindwara has a few print publications which include Hindi newspapers such as, Dainik Bhaskar, Lokmat Samachar, Patrika, Jabalpur Express, Divya Express.

Radio: There are few FM stations broadcasting from Chhindwara: Vividh Bharati and Gyan Vani.

== See also ==
- Kamalnath
