= Jam River =

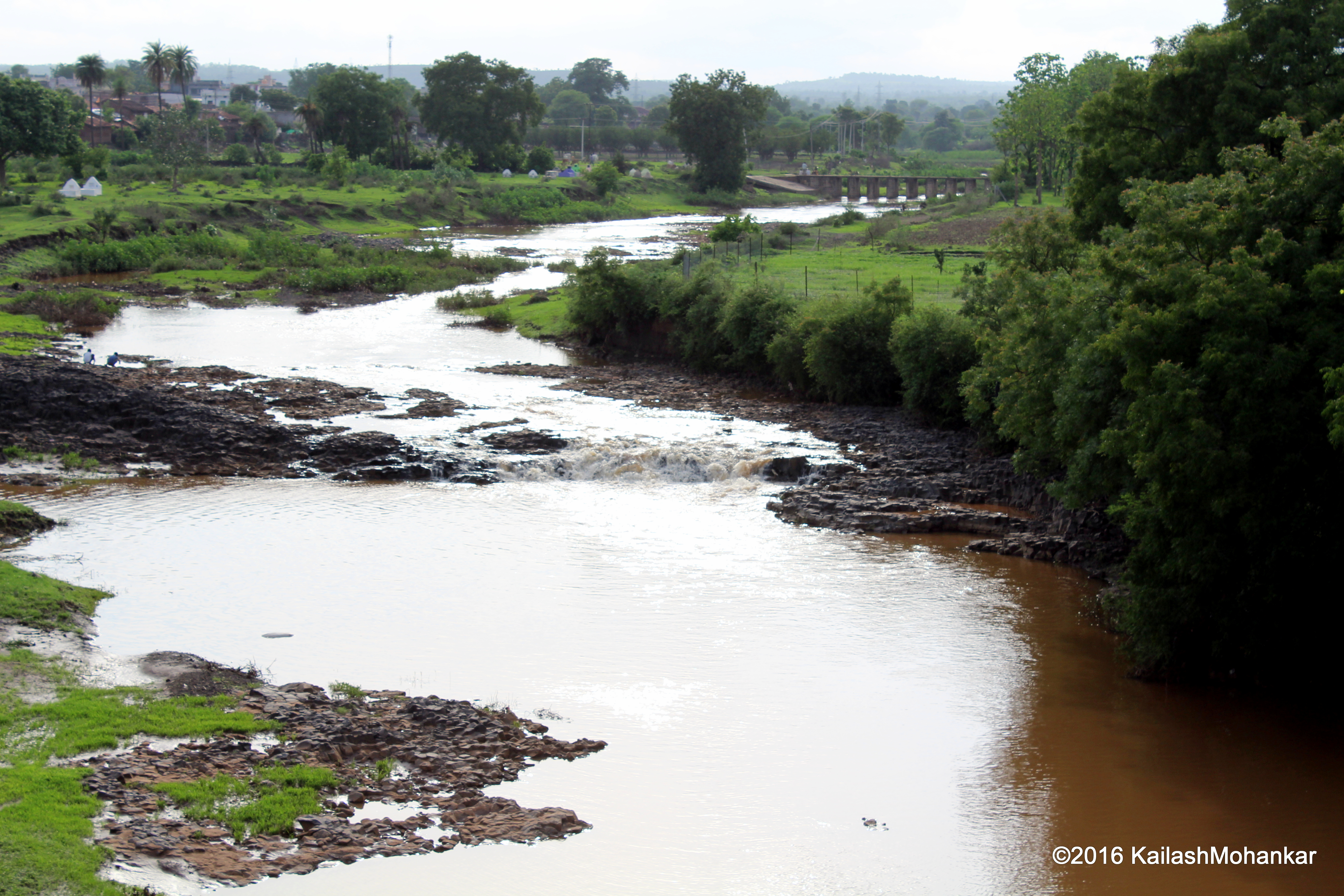
- The Jam River near Teegaon

Location
- Country: India
- State: Madhya Pradesh

Physical characteristics
- Source
  - location: Betul District
  - elevation: 762m
- Mouth
  - location: Kanhan River, below Razadi Borgaon, Madhya Pradesh
  - coordinates: 21°33′08″N 78°53′10″E

Basin features
- Tributaries
  - left: River Sarpini

Jam is an intermittent river in central India in southern Madhya Pradesh. It originates in Betul District and flows through Chhindwara District during its short run, ultimately draining into the Kanhan River. This confluence is located at the border with Maharashtra.

An ambitious water project in the form of a dam had been proposed by Maharashtra in anticipation of the growing water needs of metro Nagpur. However the project was shelved for the time being due to lack of co-operation from the state government in Madhya Pradesh.

A gotmar (stone throwing) fair, located between Sawargaon (Savargaon) village and the town of Pandhurna, is organized every year along its banks.

== Course ==
The river originates through a convergence of several rivulets and streams flowing down the hill slopes situated around Chilhati village in the Betul District in Madhya Pradesh at an altitude of 762m.

Snaking along eastwards the river enters the Chhindwara District where it flows mostly in the Sausar region, and hits flatter terrain where it collects two rivers, each of them being spill offs from dams. The first one is the overflow stream from an earthen dam located near Mandvi. The other, longer of the two streams, flows out from the Borgaon Dam, runs parallel to NH69, and merges with Jam river at Teegaon. Here the river widens out and continues its run southeast of the town receiving another tributary on its left bank near the village Chichkheda. It travels through the outskirts of the town Pandhurna changing course to run in an eastward fashion. Just before reaching the village Jam, it receives its largest tributary River Sarpini. From here the river again flows southeast-ward passing the town of Lodhikheda and ends its course by entering the Kanhan River below Razhadi Borgaon, at the village of Sangam (literally 'confluence').

The river flows only during the monsoon season.

== History ==
In 1999 forty-nine people drowned in the Jam River when a bus was swept away trying to cross the Jam River. In response to this incident, the Rajiv Gandhi bridge was built in Saunsar tehsil.
