= Dragon Palace Temple =

Buddhist temple in Maharashtra, India

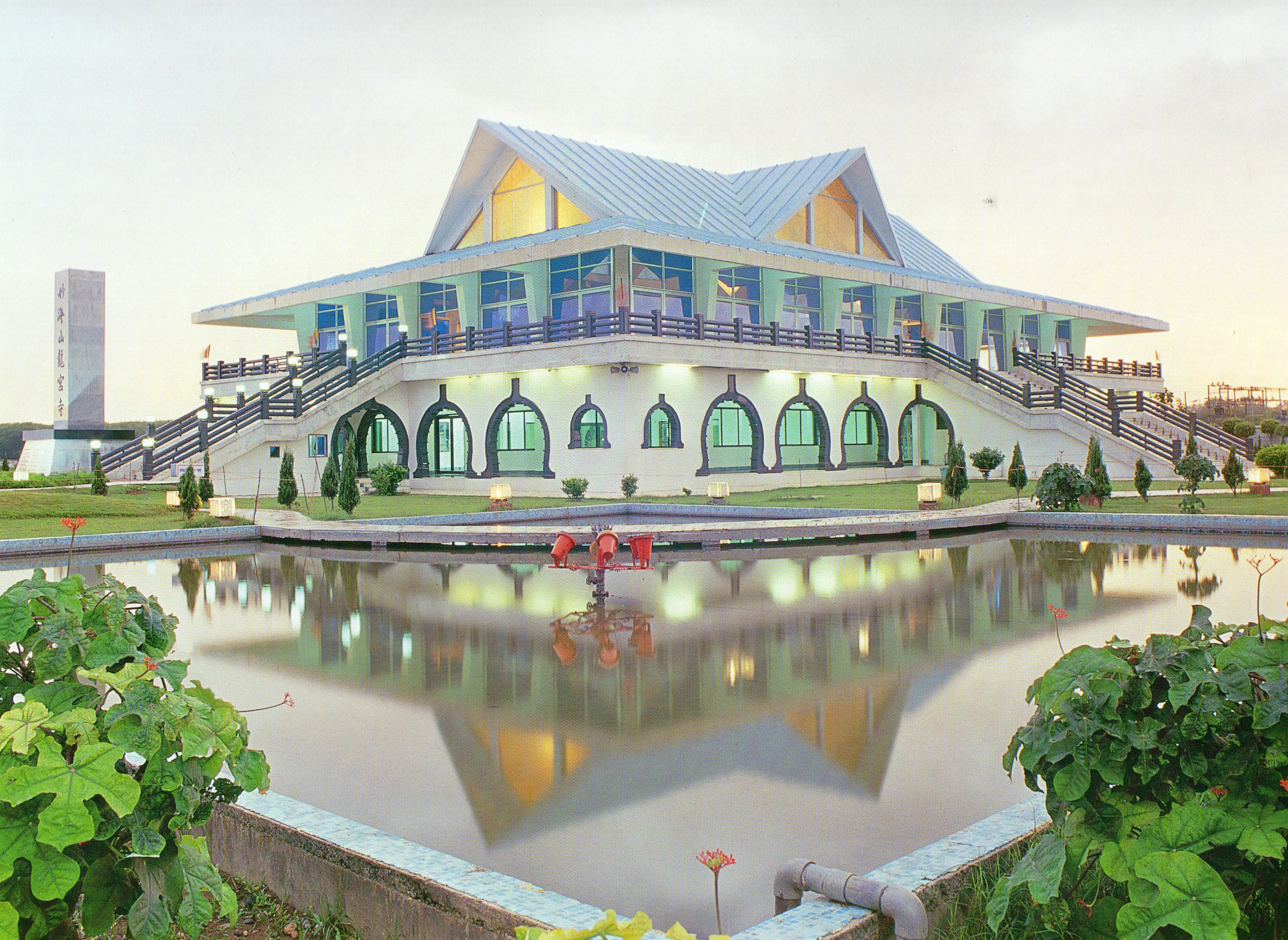
- The Dragon Palace Temple in Kamptee

Religion
- Affiliation: Buddhism
- Status: Open

Location
- Location: Kamptee, Maharashtra, India
- Country: India
- Interactive map of Dragon Palace Temple
- Coordinates: 21°12′29.9″N 79°12′11.1″E

Architecture
- Founder: Ogawa Society
- Completed: 1999

Website
- dragon-palace-temple.org

The Dragon Palace Temple, also known as the Lotus Temple of Nagpur, is a Buddhist temple in Kamptee, Maharashtra, India. The temple was established in 1999 with funds from the Japan-based Ogawa Society, a charitable trust. The temple complex encompassing the Dragon Palace houses a carved sandalwood murti that is associated with the Buddha, and the building is a pilgrimage site for practitioners of the faith.

== History ==
The Dragon Palace Temple was founded in 1999 on land purchased by Sulekha Kumbhare and Noriko Ogawa. Kumbhare was at the time serving as the mayor of Kamptee, while Ogawa was the president of a Japanese company with business connections in the area. Ogawa was also the head of the Ogawa Foundation, a charitable trust that contributed to Buddhist charitable causes. The foundation envisioned the Dragon Palace Temple as both a place for Buddhist education and meditation, as well as a symbol of Indo-Japanese friendship. This original plot of 10 acres was expanded by 40 acres in 2003.
