= Sausar =

Sausar Saunsar Saunsar
- Town
- Location in Madhya Pradesh, India Sausar (India)
- Coordinates: 21.65°N 78.78°E
- Country: India
- State: Madhya Pradesh
- District: Pandhurna

Government
  - Type: Nagar palika
- Elevation: 352 m (1,155 ft)

Population (2001)
  - Total: 24,312
- Time zone: UTC+5:30 (IST)
- Pin Code: 480106
- Vehicle registration: MP-28

Sausar (Saunsar) is a Municipal Council in the central India in the state of Madhya Pradesh. Sausar lies in Vidharbha region, Nagpur is the center for all the economic activities in this region which is just 72 km from Sausar. More than 90 per cent of farmers produce oranges. Cotton is grown in large quantities in the local area.

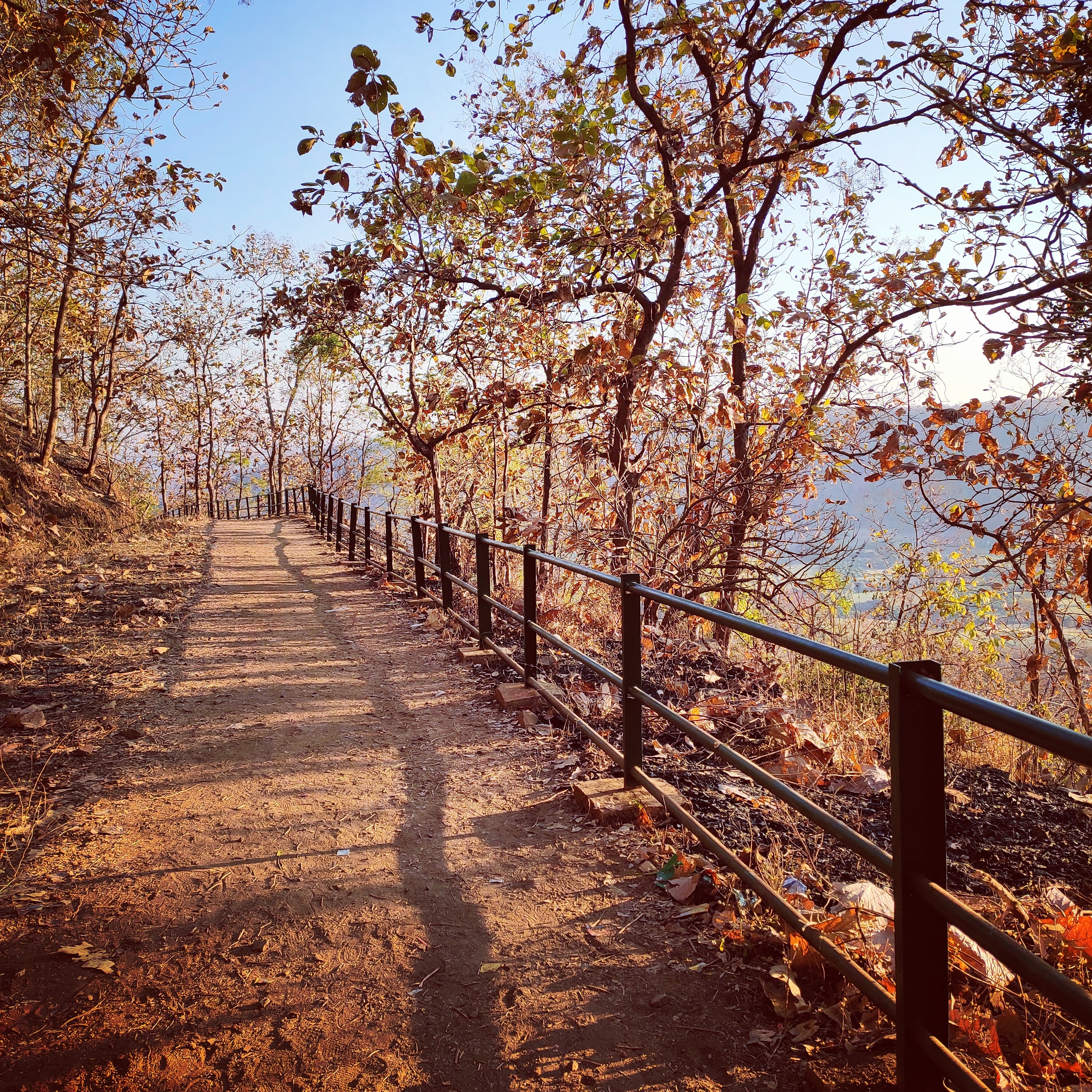
forests in sausar

== Industry ==
Sausar tehsil is home to numerous industries after the arrival of Raymond textiles in Borgaon in the 1990s, since then the industrial area called AKVN Borgaon-khairitaigaon (Audyogik Kendra Vikas Nigam) (Industrial center development Corporation) has seen a number of small and large industries of which major are Jindal Gas pipe industries and a few alloy processing units, chemical units, plastic products units, paper box and much highlighted Food park within the Industrial area which comprises food processing units in which renowned names like Britannia(Sobisco), Sunder, Suruchi (safal foods) are operational along with other dozen small scale units. The area is a hotspot for manufacturers mainly due to its location as it lies just 10 km within MP state from Maharashtra and the highway is connected to every part of India as now it has been declared a National Highway 547. Maharashtra states winter Capital Nagpur lies at a distance of just 72 km and Bhopal lies at a distance of just 300 km and Chhindwara at 55 km.

As the industrial development plan proposed by Government of India, Sausar has been gifted with a multi product SEZ near the existing industrial area.

A textile park is also about to be set up between Sausar and Pandhurna, near Rajna village, where industries related to textile and clothing will enjoy special benefits, it may become one of the largest textile parks in the nation. Shree Gayatri Industries Established on 1998 and expended in 2013 Fully Automated Ginning & Pressing Unit, His Mainly Cotton Manufacturing Unit Distributed Material in all over India.

A new wood industry is emerging in this region, (Sausar being surrounded with forests), Sagwan (Teak) furniture comes from here.

A large number of people are involved in weaving sector.

== Neighbourhood ==
Towns in Sausar Tehsil

- Kuddam
- belgaon
- Berdi
- Ramkona
- Mohgaon
- Lodhikheda
- Pipla Narayanwar
- Borgaon

== Language and culture ==
Natives speak Hindi and Marathi and a blend of both the languages as Sausar is situated near Madhya Pradesh and Maharastra border. Sausar has a great Marathi influence on its culture.

== Education ==
The city has government schools and two government colleges for science and art commerce. Raymond textiles mills had started their own CBSE pattern school for the children of their employees and the general public. Kailashpath Singhania High School similar to Bhansali Vidya Mandir Public School started by the Bhansali Engineering Polymers Ltd. in satnoor. Bhansali Vidya Mandir was first CBSE school in this area followed by Kailashpat Singhania which is located in Lodhikheda.

== Transport ==
Air The nearest International airport is 72 km away in Nagpur, Dr. Babasaheb Ambedkar International Airport (IATA: NAG, ICAO: VANP). The nearest airstrip is 55 km away in Chhindwara.

Rail Sausar Railway station SASR has regular trains from Nagpur Junction to Chhindwara making it reachable from every part of the country.

Road Sausar is connected with Nagpur via NH-547 which is a linking highway of NH-44 and NH-47 connecting it with the rest of the country.

== Geography ==
Sausar is located at 21.65°N 78.78°E in central India. It has an average elevation of 352 metres (1,154 feet). The Jam and Kanhan Rivers are the main rivers in Sausar. The city is situated between the two rivers.

== Demography ==
At the 2001 census of India, Sausar had a population of 24,312. Males constituted 52% of the population and females 48%. Sausar has an average literacy rate of 71% higher than the national average of 59.5 percent; male literacy is 77% and female literacy is 65%. In Sausar, 13% of the population is under 6 years of age.

== See also ==
- Pipla Narayanwar
