= Rangri dialect =

Rangri may refer to the following Indo-Aryan dialects:

- Rangri dialect (Malvi) (rāngaṛī), a dialect of Malvi spoken in Madhya Pradesh, India
- Rangri dialect (Haryanvi), another name for the Haryanvi spoken in Pakistan
- Rangari dialect (Marathi) (rangari), a dialect of Marathi spoken in eastern Maharashtra
