= Lodhikheda railway station =

Railway station in Madhya Pradesh, India

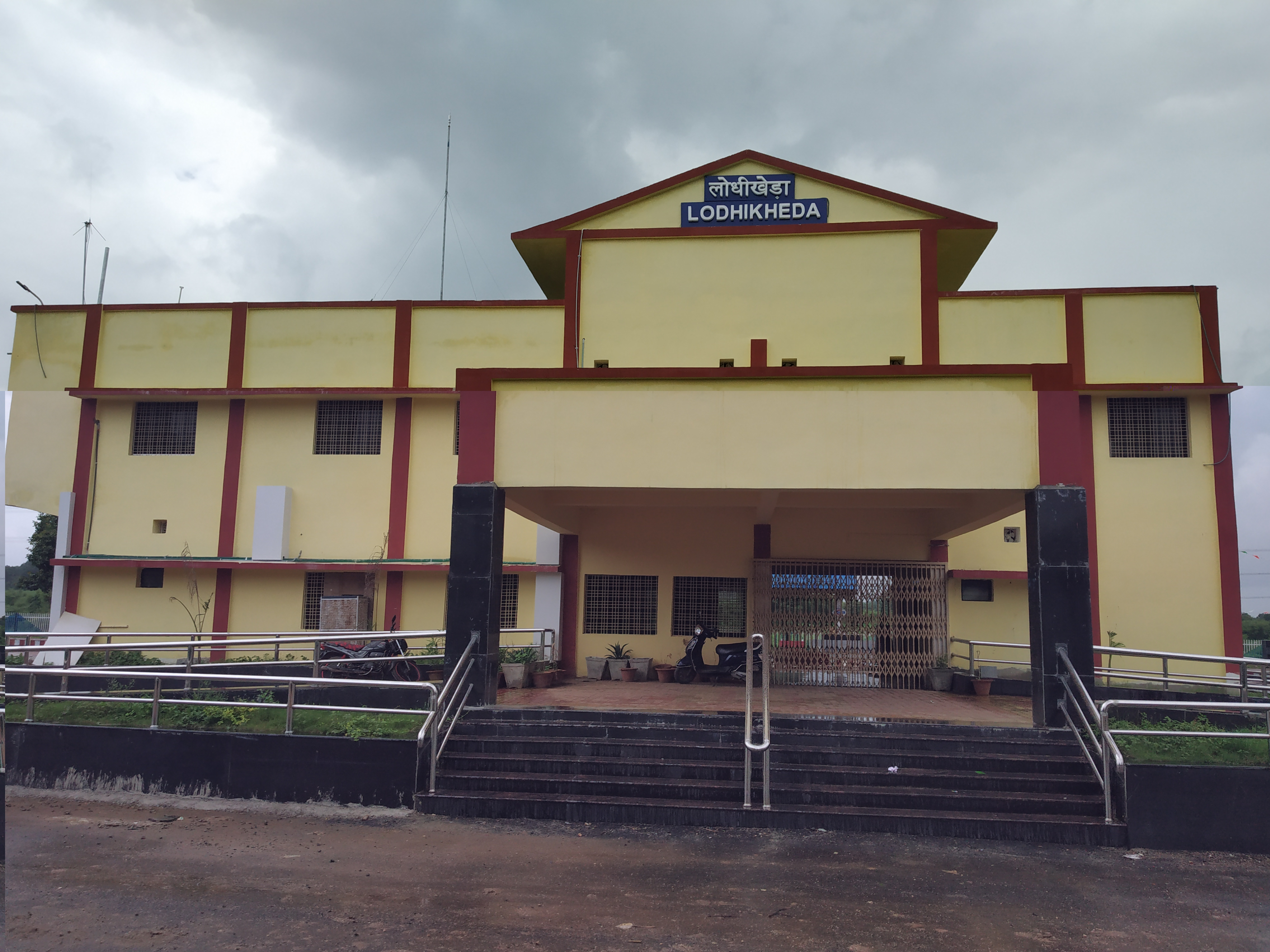
- Main building of Lodhikheda railway station

General information
- Location: Lodhikheda, Chhindwara 480108, Madhya Pradesh; India
- Coordinates: 21.5802°N 78.8548°E
- Elevation: 308.660 metres (1,012.66 ft)
- System: Express train and Passenger train station
- Owner: Indian Railways
- Operator: Government of India
- Lines: Nagpur–Chhindwara section Nagpur–Jabalpur line Kolkata–Nagpur–Mumbai line Bhopal–Nagpur section
- Platforms: 2
- Tracks: 4

Construction
- Structure type: At ground
- Parking: Available

Other information
- Status: Functional
- Station code: LDE
- Zone(s): South East Central Railway zone
- Division(s): Nagpur CR

History
- Opened: 1867; 159 years ago

Passengers
- 160,00 daily (Approx.)
Location

Lodhikheda railway station (station code: LDE) is a railway station in Lodhikheda, in the Indian state of Madhya Pradesh.It situated at the junction of Nagpur–Jabalpur and Nagpur–Chhindwara main lines.

== History ==
Nagpur railway station is one of the oldest and busiest stations in Maharashtra, India. In 1867, Mumbai rail first connected to Nagpur. In 1881, Nagpur was connected to Kolkata via the Nagpur State Railway of Chhattisgarh. It was officially inaugurated on 15 January 1925 by then-Governor Sir Frank Sly. Prior to 1924, the Nagpur Railway Junction Station was located east of its current location. Nagpur Junction railway station became a major tourist destination.

== Services ==
Lodhikheda railway station receives twenty-eight trains, with approximately 160,00 passengers embarking and disembarking daily.

Direct trains run from Nagpur railway station to all major cities, including: Mumbai, New Delhi, Bengaluru, Hyderabad, Chennai, and Kolkata.

== Development ==
In 2008, Lodhikheda railway station was among 1122 stations in India that were recommended to be upgraded to meet international standards. Priority areas were identified: security, safety and cleanliness. Work was to be undertaken via public–private partnerships and the Central Railway. but it will be clean very soon and compete with other station. "Survey of new rail line Chhindwara–Kareli–Sagour rail line is in progress. This will help in connecting villages of Chhindwara, Narsinghpur and Sagar districts and help in the development of Satpura, Mahakaushal and Bundelkhand area respectively as a whole. This will provide and alternative north–south route via Lalitpur–Sagar–Narsinghpur–Chhindwara–Nagpur route alternative to Bina–Bhopal–Itarsi–Amla–Betul–Nagpur route thereby decreasing the north–south distance by nearly 300 km. Kareli railway station will serve as an alternative to Itarsi Junction. This railway line will help in connecting Itarsi–Narsinghpur–Jabalpur–Katni stretch and Itarsi–Bhopal–Bina–Saugor–Katni stretch of West Central Railways. Recently CCEA also sanctioned Gadarwara–Indore new rail line via Budni. These two rail lines in combination will reduce the distance of state's financial capital Indore from district like Jabalpur, Narsinghpur, Hoshangabad, Sagar, Chhindwara which will help in industrial and economic development of these regions"
