= Pandhurna railway station =

Railway station in Madhya Pradesh, India

Pandhurna

General information
- Location: Pandhurna, Pandhurna district, Madhya Pradesh; India
- Coordinates: 21°35′22″N 78°31′33″E
- Elevation: 478 metres (1,568 ft)
- System: Indian Railways station
- Owner: Indian Railways
- Operator: Central Railway
- Line: Bhopal–Nagpur section
- Platforms: 2
- Tracks: 2

Construction
- Structure type: Standard (on ground)
- Parking: Yes

Other information
- Status: Functioning
- Station code: PAR
- Zone(s): Central Railway
- Division(s): Nagpur CR
Location
- Location within India Location within Madhya Pradesh

Pandhurna railway station is a railway station in Pandhurna city of Madhya Pradesh. Its code is PAR. It serves Pandhurna city. The station consists of two platforms. Passenger, Express and Superfast trains halt here.
