= Kamptee =

Kamptee Kamthi
- Suburban
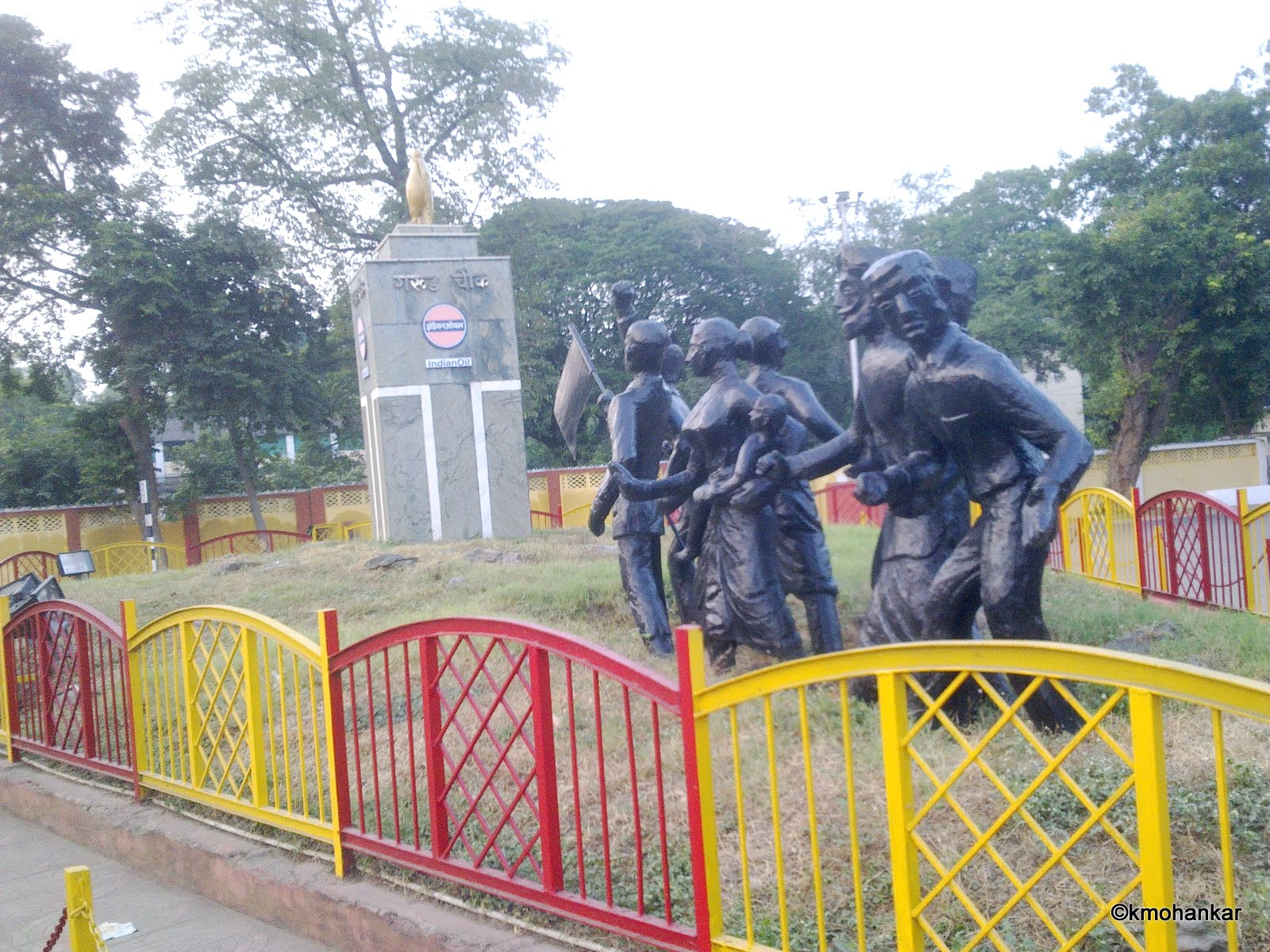
- Garuda Square, Kamptee
- Nickname: कामठी
- Location in Maharashtra, India
- Coordinates: 21°12′59.723″N 79°11′50.757″E
- Country: India
- State: Maharashtra
- District: Nagpur
- Named for: T Shaped ( Camp T )

Government
  - Type: Municipality (नगर परिषद)
  - Body: Kamptee Nagar Parishad

Area
  - Total: 14.27 km^{2} (5.51 sq mi)
- Elevation: 269 m (883 ft)

Population (2001)
  - Total: 86,793
  - Density: 6,082/km^{2} (15,750/sq mi)

Language
  - Official: Marathi
- Time zone: UTC+5:30 (IST)
- PIN: 441001/441002
- Telephone code: +91-7109
- Vehicle registration: MH 40 And MH 31

Kamptee is a suburb of Nagpur city and a municipal council in Nagpur district in the Indian state of Maharashtra. It is part of the Nagpur metropolitan region development authority. It is the administrative center for Kamptee taluka. It is below the confluence of the Kanhan River with the rivers Pench and Kolar.

== History ==
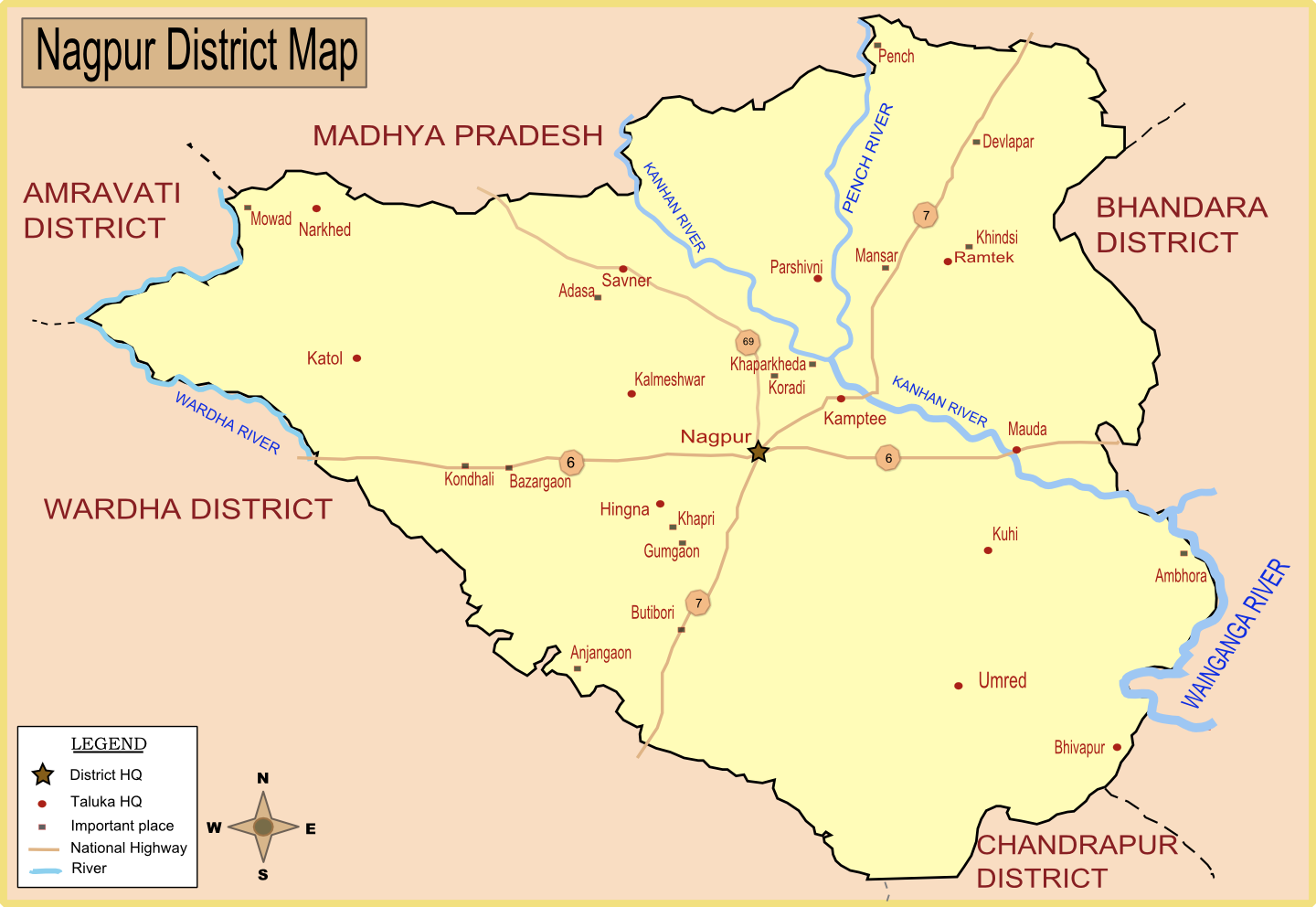
Map of Nagpur district showing location of Kamptee.

Kamptee was founded in 1821 when the British established a military cantonment on the banks of the Kanhan. Kamptee was previously named Camp-T for its shape. The town quickly became a center for trade, but trade dwindled with the arrival of the railway in the late 19th century. An Iron Age hoard of weapons was excavated by Major George Pearse of the Royal Artillery from the Wurreegaon barrow near Kamptee in the mid-nineteenth century. Dating to between the 7th and 1st centuries BCE, it was one of the first hoards from this period discovered in the Indian Sub-Continent and is now kept in the British Museum, London.

== Geography ==
National Highway No.7 passes through Kamptee. Three bridges cross the Kanhan river. One is a railway bridge, one is road N.H.7, and the third is a small road that goes to Old Kamptee. One water filter plant supplies the larger area of Nagpur city.

== Religion ==
Hindus, Buddhists, Muslims, Christians, and Sikhs are well represented in Kamptee, with Hindus, Buddhists, and Muslims in the majority. According to the 2011 census of India, Islam is the city's most prominent religion, with approximately 43.18% of the population following it. Hinduism is followed by 34.14% of the population, and Buddhism by 21.78% of the population. Sikhism is followed by 0.28% of the population and Christianity by 0.21% of the population.

| Year | Male | Female | Total Population | Change | Religion (%) | | | | | | | |
| Year | Male | Female | Total Population | Change | Hindu | Muslim | Christian | Sikhs | Buddhist | Jain | Other religions and persuasions | Religion not stated |
|---|---|---|---|---|---|---|---|---|---|---|---|---|
| 2001 | 42626 | 41718 | 84344 | - | 37.514 | 39.600 | 0.328 | 0.273 | 21.994 | 0.261 | 0.011 | 0.019 |
| 2011 | 43470 | 43323 | 86793 | 2.904 | 34.135 | 43.175 | 0.279 | 0.212 | 21.784 | 0.184 | 0.008 | 0.222 |

The city is home to nearly 40 mosques. The Badi Masjid mosque is 130 years old, while the Kolsatal mosque is over 100 years old. The Shia Haidry Jama Masjid and Maula Ali Dargah which are located in Husainabad, were constructed more than 130 years ago.

The temple Ram-Mandir was built in the 19th century by the father of P. Damodar Naidu of Kamptee. Jagdish Swami Mandir is present in the Juni Oli locality.

Churches were also established in Kamptee. The area hosts a Roman Catholic establishment of the Order of St. Francis de Sales, with a church and convent. The Immaculate Conception Church, the oldest church in central India, was built in 1820 and sits in the cantonment area.

Buddhists built the Dragon Palace Temple in 1999. Around 1,000,000 Buddhists annually gather at Dragon Palace. A Jain temple is around one thousand years old. It is full of sculptures and carvings; it depicts the Ramayan and the Mahabharat.

A 1,000-year-old Jain mandir is at Lala oli. It is said that the Shikar of the Jain temple is nearly 300 years old. The temple was renovated by the Bhosale King of Nagpur in the eighteenth century. An idol in the image of Jain Tteerthankar Munisuvatnath was found hidden in a small room below the temple. This is the atishay (Sanskrit: अतिशय, lit. 'marvel', 'miracle', or 'supernatural wonder') of the temple. On 20 August 2016, one more underground room was discovered during temple renovation.

== Transport ==
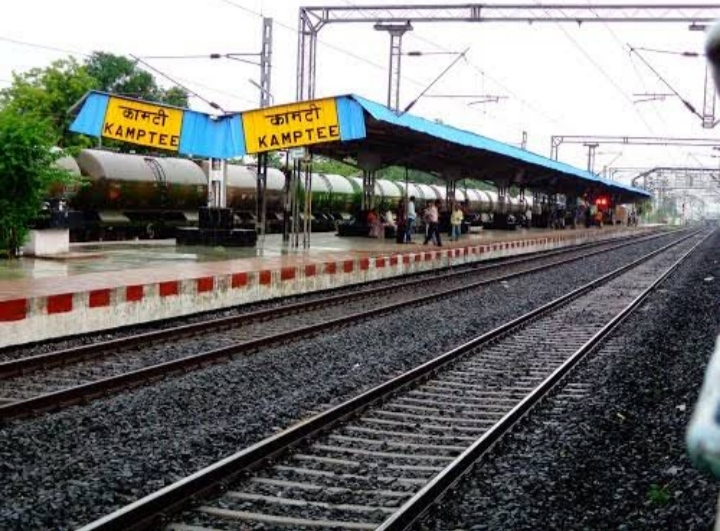
Kamptee Railway Station

Kamptee is well connected through railway and road transport and it is situated on the Mumbai Howrah railway line. There are several trains that run from the Kamptee railway station to almost all major cities nearby. Apart from the railway station, Kamptee also has a bus station and regular buses named Aapli buses run daily between Nagpur and Kamptee.

== Education ==
Kamptee has ninety-four Anganwadi pre-primary schools, eighty government-aided primary schools, and a government-funded high school. The two tertiary colleges are Seth Kesrimal Porwal College, established in 1965 with faculties of science, commerce and the arts, and Smt. Kishoritai Bhoyar College of Pharmacy. Kamptee has one of the biggest schools in the region: Kendriya Vidyalaya Kamptee and Army Public School caters mainly to children from military families but some civilian children are also allowed.

Kamptee has produced poets, authors and scholars, who were proficient in Hindi, Marathi and Urdu.

Kamptee has a primary school named Cantonment Board Hindi Primary School, a central government school. It provides quality education to children who can afford school fees.

The School of Home Science, once run by Shri Ramakrishna Samskriti Peeth, was founded by Mr B.N. Sen and operated by Mr. B.T. Adwani. It is now operated by the Ramakrishna Sarada Mission.

St. Joseph Convent has graduated actors such as Shahbaz Khan.

M.M. Rabbani High School and Junior College were established by Sheikh Hussain Rabbani in 1932. It produced National award winners Yaseen Quddusi and Ilyas Quddusi. It produced the politician Shameem Faizee. St. Joseph convent is a 156-year-old institution.

Indira High school and junior college were founded by Mr. Arjunlal Kastry.

MSBVEE is an autonomous body governed by the Maharashtra State Government. It provides courses in vocational education. Regulation VOC-2012/591 recognized MSBVE Certification as equivalent of HSC and as "Alternate Qualification" to ITI Courses. This places students completing MSBVE class XII at par with other students of HSC to take admission to graduation/degree courses for university in India and abroad.

Regulation G.R. No. VOC-2012/697 changed the certificate program from MSBVE to "MSBVEE Diploma". Rabbani ITI & Junior College is the first institute from Kamptee to be recognised by MSBVEE for running this course in Mechanical Engineering, Electrician, and Motor Vehicle Mechanic.

This city has a computer education center named Maxim.

== Sport ==
This city is a nursery of football players, and has produced many national and international players.

== Military history ==
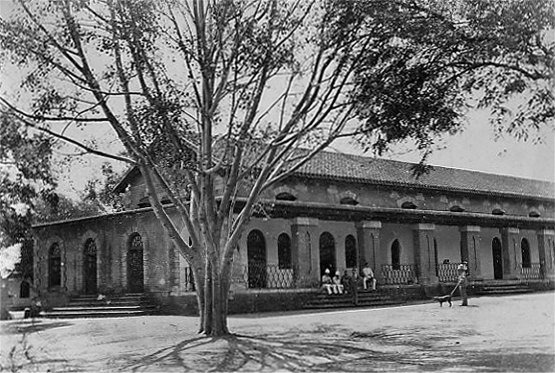
British Army Headquarters Kamptee 1894

The 'raison d'être for Kamptee military cantonment survives. Kamptee Cantonment houses the Officers Training Academy for National Cadets Corps, which is the only one of its kind. It is the home of one of the oldest and most respected regiments in the Indian Army, the Brigade of the Guards. The unit holds the distinction of winning one PVC (Param Vir Chakra), the highest gallantry award bestowed upon soldiers for wartime operations. Other important units include the Institute of Military Law and a military hospital catering to service personnel. Kamptee's Army Postal Service Centre has been operational in the cantonment since 1948, providing training to personnel of the Department of Post who volunteer for army service.

== Demographics ==
As of 2001, India census, Kamptee had a population of 86,793. Males constitute 51% of the population and females 49%. Kamptee has an average literacy rate of 76%, higher than the national average of 59.5%: male literacy is 81%, and female literacy is 72%. In Kamptee, 13% of the population is under six years.
