= Kanhan River =

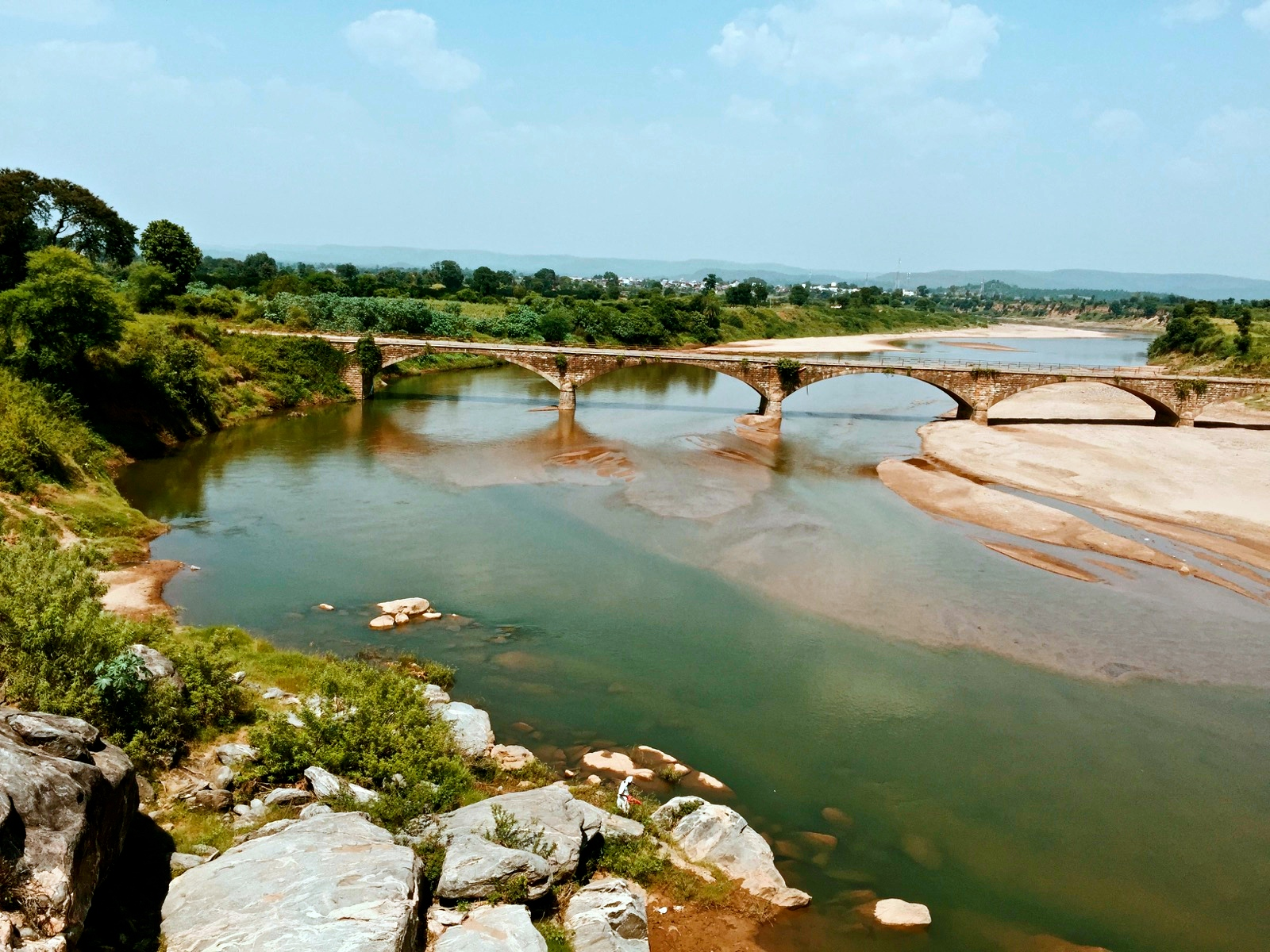
- Kanhan River near Ramkona.

Location
- Country: India
- State: Madhya Pradesh, Maharashtra
- Region: Vidharba
- District: Chhindwara District, Madhya Pradesh, Nagpur District, Maharashtra
- Cities: Junnardeo, Damua, Sausar, Kamthi

Physical characteristics
- Source: Satpura Range
  - location: Chhindwara District, Madhya Pradesh
  - coordinates: 22°14′N 78°25′E
- Mouth: Wainganga River
  - location: Ambora, Nagpur district, Maharashtra
  - coordinates: 21°04′N 79°35′E
- Length: 275 km (171 mi)

Basin features
- Tributaries
  - left: Pench River, Sand River
  - right: Bel River, Jam River, Kolar River, Nag River

The Kanhan River is an important right bank tributary of the Wainganga River draining a large area lying south of Satpura range in central India. Along its 275 km run through the Indian States of Maharashtra and Madhya Pradesh, it receives its largest tributary - Pench River, a major water source for the metropolis of Nagpur.

The Kanhan was not mentioned in the 2001 list of notified rivers in Maharashtra which has led to unrestricted exploitation in the form of sand mining along the river bed. This failure to recognise its presence has been viewed as a deliberate attempt at unregulated economic gains. The catchment area has also seen largescale coal mining in recent years. Efforts are currently underway to notify the river to prevent further environmental damage. This has been undermined by plans for construction of a barrage. The river was perennial until a few decades ago, but now goes dry by February every year.

== Sources ==
The Kanhan rises on the slopes of the hills at the southern edge of the Satpura range to the north of Damua and west of Junnardeo, a town in Madhya Pradesh, India. The source lacks clear documentation and is not celebrated or considered holy, unlike most other rivers of a similar size.

== Course ==
=== Within Madhya Pradesh ===
The Kanhan is Wainganga's longest tributary, at 275 km. It rises in the southern spurs of the Satpura Range in the north-western region of Chhindwara District. Flowing south from its origin, Damua is the first town it encounters. Here it intersects the town and allows for its flow to be controlled by means of a dam. It then runs along a south & southeastern direction, meandering through the countryside of Chhindwara District where it has been productively harnessed for growing Tur dal and cotton. The river comes to lie about 5 km to the south of Deogarh fort where it humbly receives an insignificant tributary. Upon reaching the town of Ramkona it is crossed by a rail bridge as well as another road bridge which supports NH-26 B. Nearly at the end of its course in Madhya Pradesh at Razadi Borgaon, it is joined by Jam River, and for a short distance provides a natural boundary with adjoining state Maharashtra.

=== Within Maharashtra ===
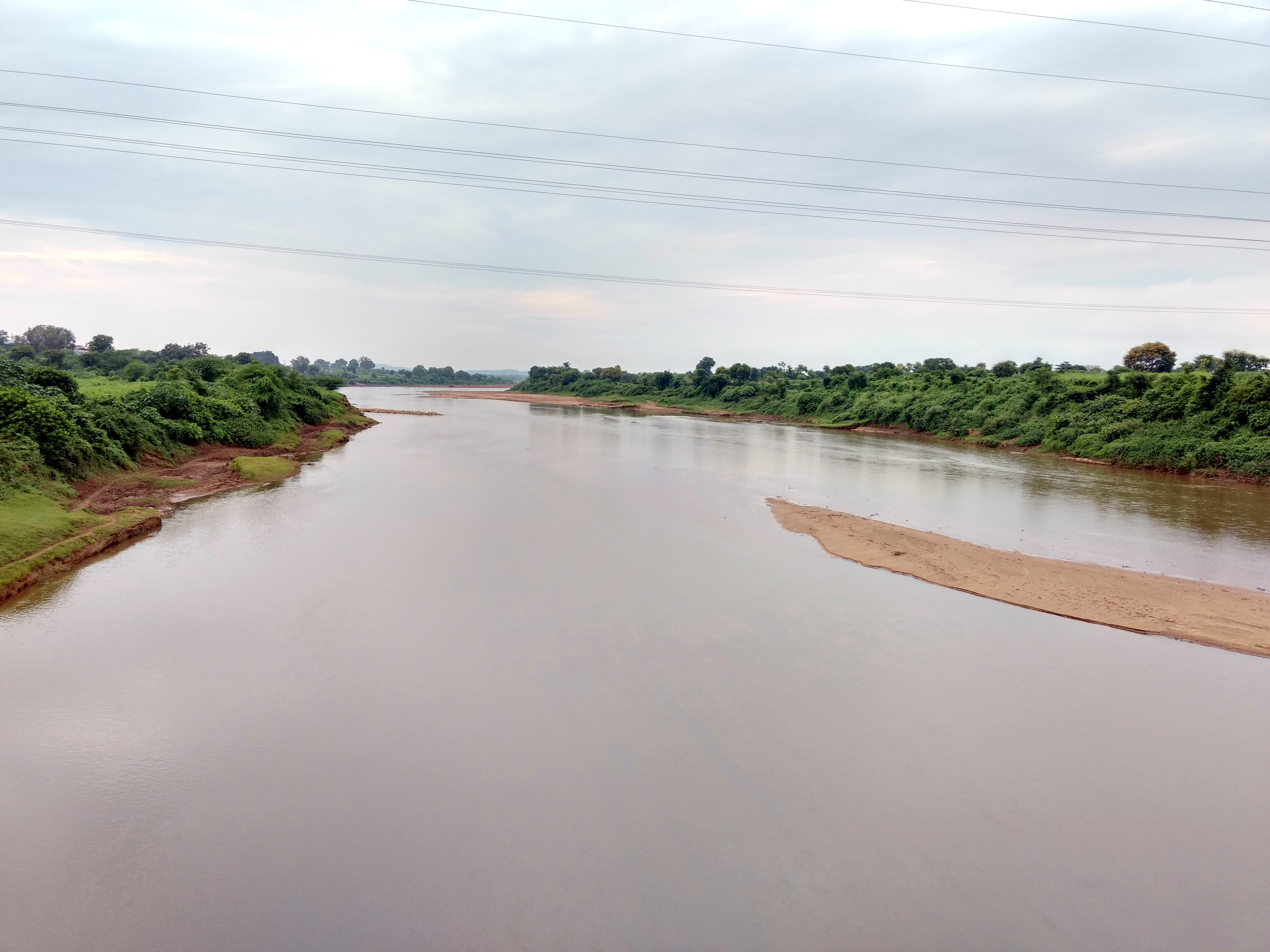
Kanhan river near Khapa in Maharashtra

Within Maharashtra the river is at its widest at Kamptee where it receives the Pench River- a left bank tributary and its largest one. Another tributary connecting it at its right bank is Kolar River - the spill off from Kolar Dam. The river now comes to be at the northeast of Nagpur from which it receives the metropolitan city's effluent waste by way of the Nag River. A little further from Kamptee, it flows along the town Kanhan - its etymology derived from the river. Situated alongside the town is a large coal mine, one of the many coal mines situated along its river basin. From here the river flows south-east and ends its course by joining the Wainganga at the village of Ambora in Nagpur District.

== Dam ==
Sand mining activities takes place on a large scale on the Kanhan river bed preventing the construction of any major dams . Kochi barrage is one of the proposed projects on Kanhan river.

== Surroundings ==
Mauda Super Thermal Power Station, Koradi Thermal Power Station and Khaparkheda Thermal Power Station are on the bank of Kanhan River.

Mauda Town, Kamthi, Kanhan, Sausar, Hirdagarh, Damua are few major town and cities on the bank of Kanhan River.

NH-69 A, NH-26 B, NH-7, NH-6 are major National Highway crossing Kanhan River.

== News ==
In September 2012, a youngster duo who went to swim in the river were later discovered dead along the banks, allegedly drowned in the river.
