= Pandhurna =

City in Madhya Pradesh, India

- Municipality
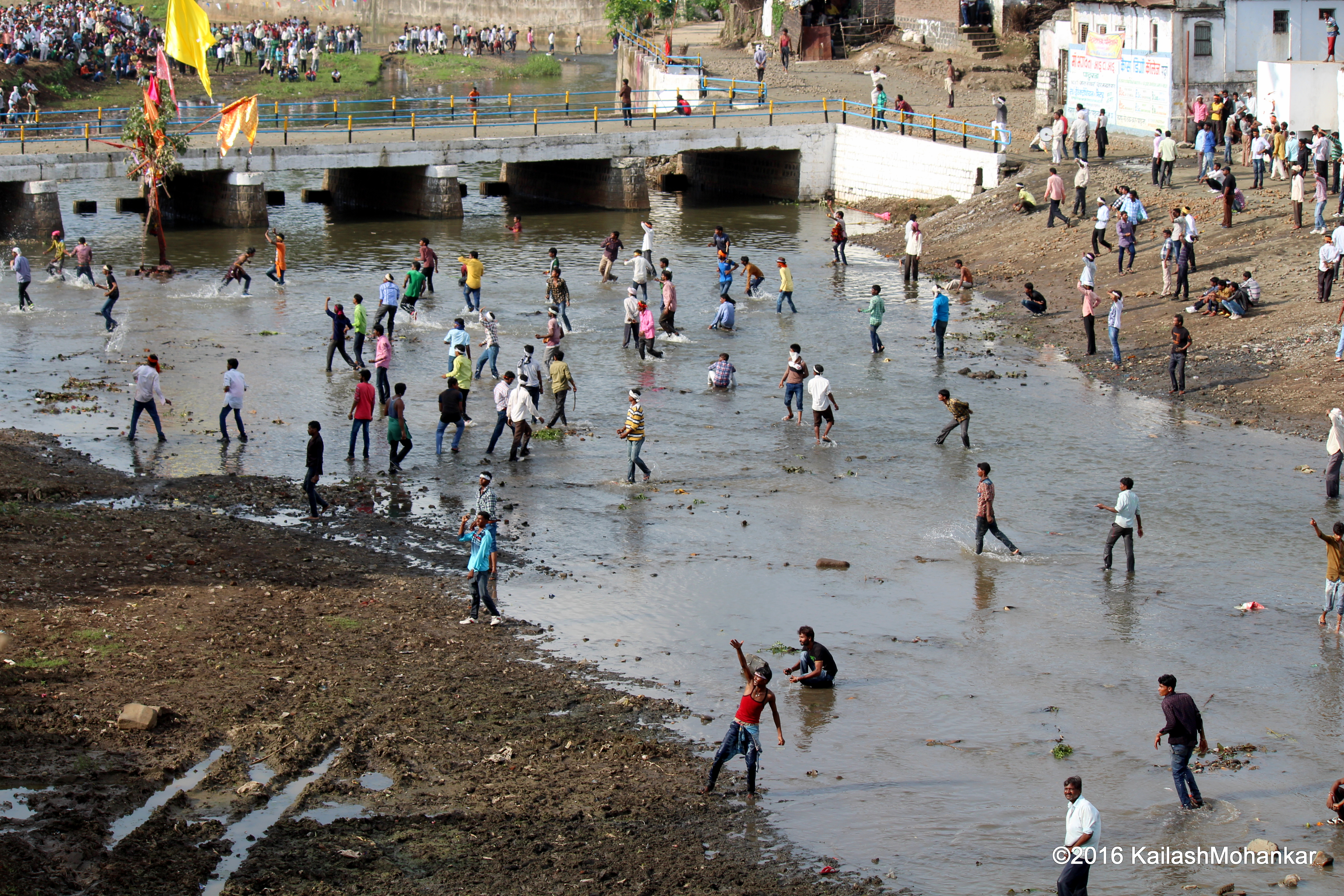
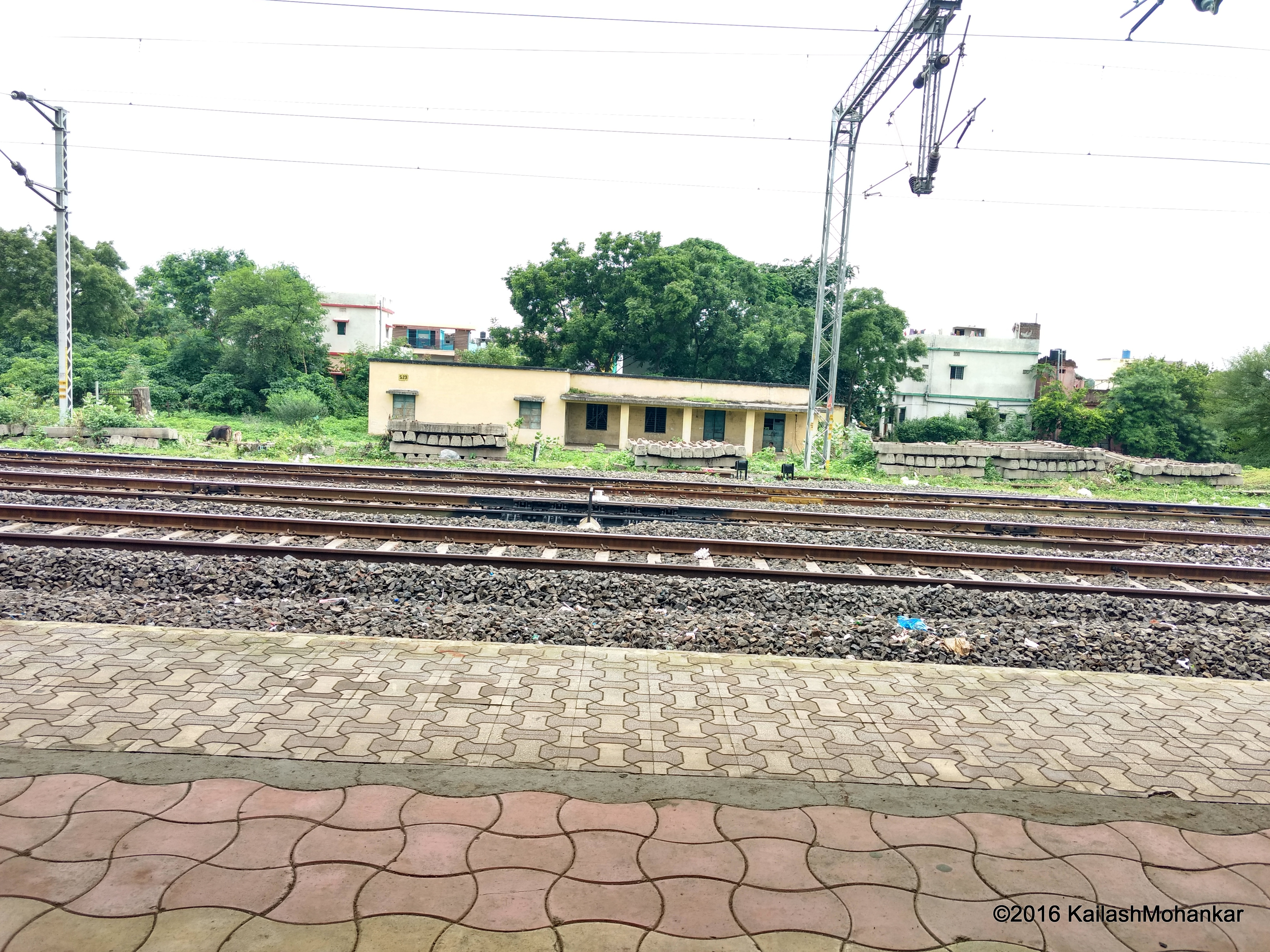
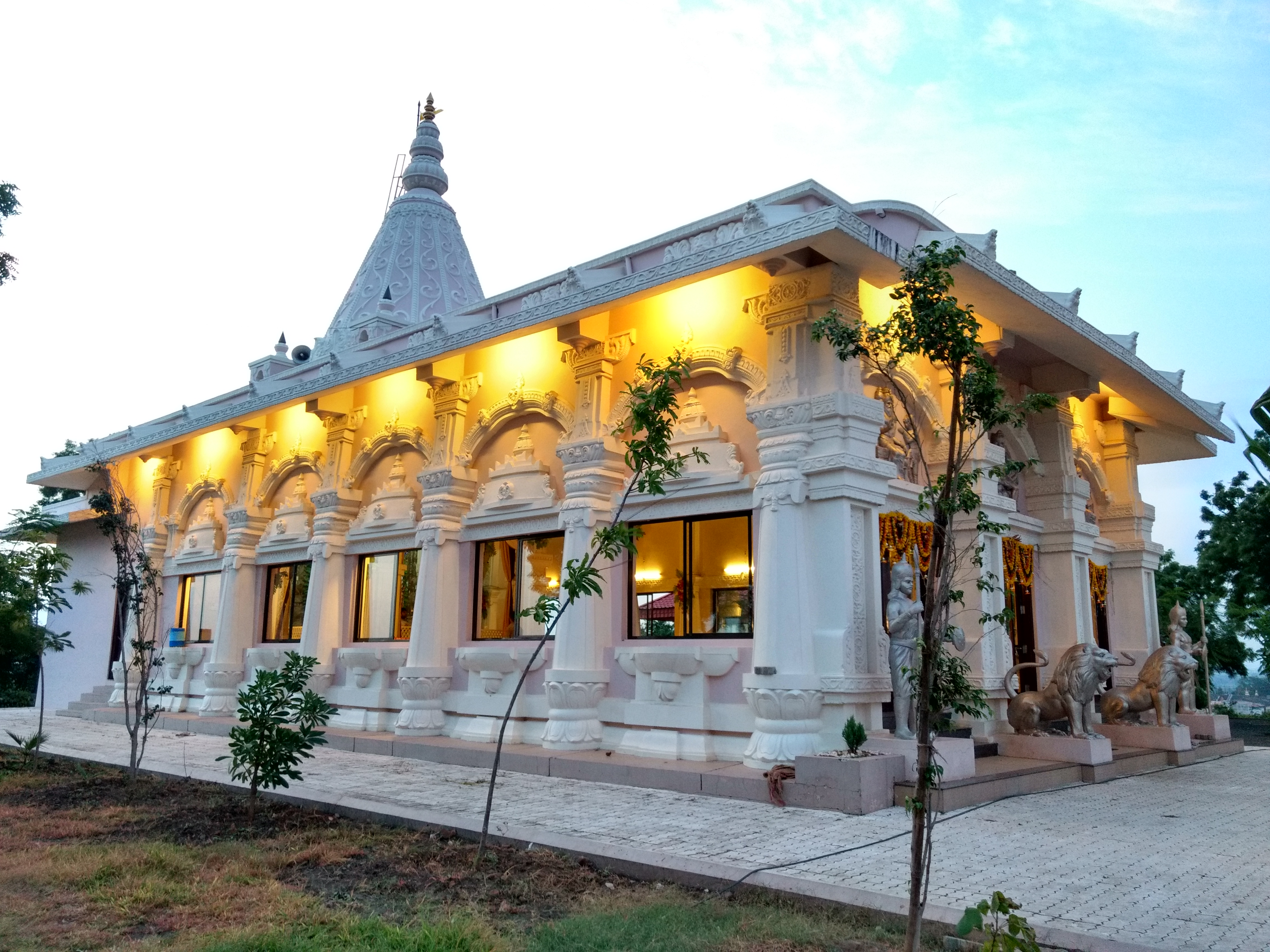
- top left : Gotmar mela top right : Platform no. 1 of Pandhurna; Bottom : Sai Mandir Pandhurna
- Nickname: city of Gotmar
- Location in Madhya Pradesh, India Pandhurna (India)
- Coordinates: 21°35′39.459″N 78°31′38.594″E
- Country: India
- State: Madhya Pradesh
- District: Pandhurna District
- Established: 05/10/2023

Government
  - Type: district council pandhurna
- Elevation: 474 m (1,555 ft)

Population (2011)
  - Total: 45,479

Languages
  - Official: Hindi
- Time zone: UTC+5:30 (IST)
- PIN: 480334
- Vehicle registration: M.P. 28

Pandhurna is a City and a Municipality and the administrative headquarter of the Pandhurna District in Madhya Pradesh, India.

== Geography ==
Pandhurna is located at 21.6°N 78.52°E. It has an average elevation of 474 metres (1,555 feet). It is located on National Highway-47 (NH-47). The city is situated on the banks of the Jam River.

== Demographics ==
As of the 2011 Indian census, the municipality of Pandhurna have a population of 193,818, of which 100,657 were males while 93,156 were females.

The population of children ages 0–6 is 4,986, which is 10.96% of the total population of the municipality of Pandhurna. The female sex ratio is 937, as opposed to the Madhya Pradesh average of 931. Moreover, the child sex ratio in Pandhurna is around 959 compared to the state average of 918. The literacy rate of the city of Pandhurna is 87.03%, which is higher than the state average of 69.32%. In Pandhurna, male literacy is around 91.02% while the female literacy rate is 82.76%.

== Castes ==
Schedule Caste (SC) constitutes 8.66% while Schedule Tribe (ST) were 6.02% of total population in Pandhurna (M).

== Work profile ==
Out of the total population, 18,265 were engaged in work or business activity, of which 13,272 were male while 4,993 were female. "Worker" was defined in the 2017 Indian census as a person who does business, job, service, or cultivator and labour activity. Of total 18,265 working population, 86.87% were engaged in Main Work while 13.13% of total workers were engaged in Marginal Work.

== Administration ==
Pandhurna is a municipality in the district of Pandhurna, Madhya Pradesh. The city of Pandhurna is divided into 30 wards for which elections are held every 5 years.The municipality of Pandhurna has total administration over 10,243 houses to which it supplies basic amenities like water and sewerage. It is also authorized to build roads within municipality limits and impose taxes on properties under its jurisdiction.

== Government ==
Pandhurna Assembly constituency is one of the 230 Vidhan Sabha (Legislative Assembly) constituencies of Madhya Pradesh state in central India.

== See also ==
- Pandhurna District
- Pandhurna railway station
- Pandhurna Assembly constituency
