= Sarsai =

- Village
- Country: India
- State: Gujarat
- District: Junagadh
- Elevation: 144 m (472 ft)

Population
  - Total: 5,162
- Time zone: UTC+5:30 (IST)
- PIN: 362120
- Telephone code: 02873
- Language: Gujarati, Hindi, English

Sarsai is a village of Visavadar Taluka Junagadh district, Gujarat State, India. It is located 38 kilometres (24 mi) east of district headquarters Junagadh, and 339 km (211 mi) from state capital Gandhinagar. Its Postal Index Number is 362120.

Sarsai village has population of 1,084 families and 5,162 individuals, of which 2,661 are males while 2,501 are females, as per Population Census 2011. Sarsai village is administrated by a village head (Sarpanch) who is elected.

Dhrafad dam is 0.5 km from Sarsai.
