= Jatan Uikey =

Indian politician

Member of the Madhya Pradesh Legislative Assembly
- Incumbent
- Assumed office 2013
- Preceded by: Ramrao Kavdeti
- Constituency: Pandhurna

Personal details
- Born: 5 July 1972 (age 53) Dighori
- Citizenship: India
- Party: Indian National Congress
- Spouse: Lalli Uikey
- Education: HSC
- Alma mater: P.G. College, Chhindwara
- Profession: Politician

Jatan Uikey is an Indian politician and a member of the Indian National Congress party.

== Political career ==
He became an MLA in 2013.

== Political views ==
He supports Congress Party's ideology.

== Personal life ==
He is married to Lalli Uikey.

== See also ==
- Madhya Pradesh Legislative Assembly
- 2013 Madhya Pradesh Legislative Assembly election
