= Lodhikheda =

- Town
- Location in Madhya Pradesh, India Lodhikheda (India)
- Coordinates: 21.58°N 78.83°E
- Country: India
- State: Madhya Pradesh
- District: Pandhurna

Government
  - President: Droupadi Murmu
  - Vice president: Jagdeep Dhankhar
  - Prime minister: Narendra Modi
  - Chief minister: Mohan Yadav
  - MLA: Vijay Revnath Chaure
- Elevation: 410 m (1,350 ft)

Population (2011)
  - Total: 9,950

Languages
  - Official: Hindi
- Time zone: UTC+5:30 (IST)
- Postal code: 480108
- Telephone code: 07165
- Vehicle registration: MP-28
- Nearest city: Nagpur
- Literacy: 87%
- Vidhan Sabha constituency: Sausar
- Climate: Healthy (Köppen)
- Website: nplodhikheda.com

Lodhikheda is a town and a nagar parishad in Pandhurna district in the Indian state of Madhya Pradesh. It is famous for its oranges. More than 90 per cent of farmers produce oranges. Cotton is grown in large quantities in the local area.

== Geography ==
Lodhikheda is located at 21.58°N 78.83°E. It has an average elevation of 410 metres (1345 feet).

== Demographics ==
As of 2011 India census, Lodhikheda had a population of 9950. Males constitute 51% of the population and females 49%. Lodhikheda has an average literacy rate of 69%, higher than the national average of 59.5%: male literacy is 77%, and female literacy is 61%. In Lodhikheda, 15% of the population is under 6 years of age.

== Education ==
With the arrival of industries in the area, the population of the region has gradually been increasing, creating the need for quality education, and hence a number of schools and colleges are born in the last two decades apart from the government schools and one government colleges for science and arts commerce respectively. Raymond textiles mills had started their own CBSE pattern school for the children of their employees and general public as well as Kailashpath Singhania High School similar to Bhansali Public School started by the Bhansali Engineering Polymers Ltd. Since then a number of schools have been started by renowned residents and education professionals. At present the town is one of the best places in the nearby districts of the state, with more than 5 schools with modern education.

=== Colleges ===
Govt college of Art and Commerce, Lodhikheda, Satpura College of Information & Bio Technology, Sausar, Revnath Choure College of Information & Technology, Sausar, Little Step College of Science & Technology, Borgaon.

=== Schools ===
Lala Kailashpat Singhania High School, Kanhan Higher Secondary School, Govt. Girls Higher Secondary School, Govt. Middle School, Sarswati Shishu Mandir Higher Secondary School, New Sai Sharda School, Chatrapati Shiwaji Primary School, Govt Urdhu School. little step English medium school lodhikheda, saraswati shishu mandir higher secondary school, G.S.D.M. Gurukul higher secondary school, Bhaskaram public school, sunflower school.

== Climate ==
Lodhikheda has tropical wet and dry climate (Köppen climate classification) with dry conditions prevailing for most of the year. It receives an annual rainfall of 1,205 mm (47.44 inches) from monsoon rains during June to September. The highest recorded daily rainfall was 304 mm on 14 July 1994. Summers are extremely hot, lasting from March to June, with May being the hottest month. Winter lasts from November to January, during which temperatures drop below 10 °C (50 °F). The highest recorded temperature in the city was 48 °C on 19 May 2015, while the lowest was 3.9 °C.

Climate data for Lodhikheda (1971–1990)
| Month | Jan | Feb | Mar | Apr | May | Jun | Jul | Aug | Sep | Oct | Nov | Dec | Year |
|---|---|---|---|---|---|---|---|---|---|---|---|---|---|
| Record high °C (°F) | 36.6 (97.9) | 39.2 (102.6) | 45.0 (113.0) | 46.1 (115.0) | 47.8 (118.0) | 47.7 (117.9) | 40.6 (105.1) | 37.8 (100.0) | 38.9 (102.0) | 39.5 (103.1) | 35.6 (96.1) | 39.7 (103.5) | 47.8 (118.0) |
| Mean daily maximum °C (°F) | 28.7 (83.7) | 31.2 (88.2) | 36.2 (97.2) | 40.7 (105.3) | 42.4 (108.3) | 37.5 (99.5) | 31.6 (88.9) | 30.5 (86.9) | 32.3 (90.1) | 32.7 (90.9) | 30.4 (86.7) | 28.1 (82.6) | 33.5 (92.3) |
| Daily mean °C (°F) | 20.8 (69.4) | 23.2 (73.8) | 27.7 (81.9) | 32.5 (90.5) | 35.1 (95.2) | 31.9 (89.4) | 27.9 (82.2) | 27.1 (80.8) | 27.7 (81.9) | 26.4 (79.5) | 23.0 (73.4) | 20.4 (68.7) | 27.0 (80.6) |
| Mean daily minimum °C (°F) | 12.9 (55.2) | 15.1 (59.2) | 19.2 (66.6) | 24.3 (75.7) | 27.8 (82.0) | 26.3 (79.3) | 24.1 (75.4) | 23.6 (74.5) | 23.1 (73.6) | 20.0 (68.0) | 15.5 (59.9) | 12.6 (54.7) | 20.4 (68.7) |
| Record low °C (°F) | 3.9 (39.0) | 5.0 (41.0) | 8.3 (46.9) | 13.9 (57.0) | 19.4 (66.9) | 20.0 (68.0) | 19.4 (66.9) | 18.3 (64.9) | 16.6 (61.9) | 11.6 (52.9) | 6.7 (44.1) | 5.5 (41.9) | 3.9 (39.0) |
| Average precipitation mm (inches) | 16 (0.6) | 22 (0.9) | 15 (0.6) | 8 (0.3) | 18 (0.7) | 168 (6.6) | 290 (11.4) | 291 (11.5) | 157 (6.2) | 73 (2.9) | 17 (0.7) | 19 (0.7) | 1,094 (43.1) |
| Average rainy days (≥ 1.0 mm) | 1.8 | 2.2 | 1.9 | 1.2 | 2.9 | 11.4 | 17.5 | 16.5 | 10.4 | 4.0 | 1.3 | 1.1 | 72.2 |
| Average relative humidity (%) | 54 | 43 | 30 | 24 | 27 | 55 | 77 | 80 | 74 | 61 | 55 | 56 | 53 |
| Mean monthly sunshine hours | 272.0 | 268.3 | 287.6 | 290.8 | 293.8 | 186.6 | 115.4 | 116.7 | 182.5 | 260.4 | 264.1 | 268.8 | 2,807 |
Source 1: NOAA
Source 2: India Meteorological Department (record high and low up to 2010)

== Culture ==
Pola (Festival of Bullocks) and Holi are the main festivals of this area. Famous Marathi writers include Ram Ganesh Gadkari. Most of the people of Lodhikheda are Maratha/ Kunbi (farmers), Sonar(Jewellers),Teli (oil merchants) and Koshtis (cotton weavers), and some of the red dye is still produced, for which the town was at one time noted. In addition, all the main Indian festivals are celebrated here.

== Religious places and festivals ==
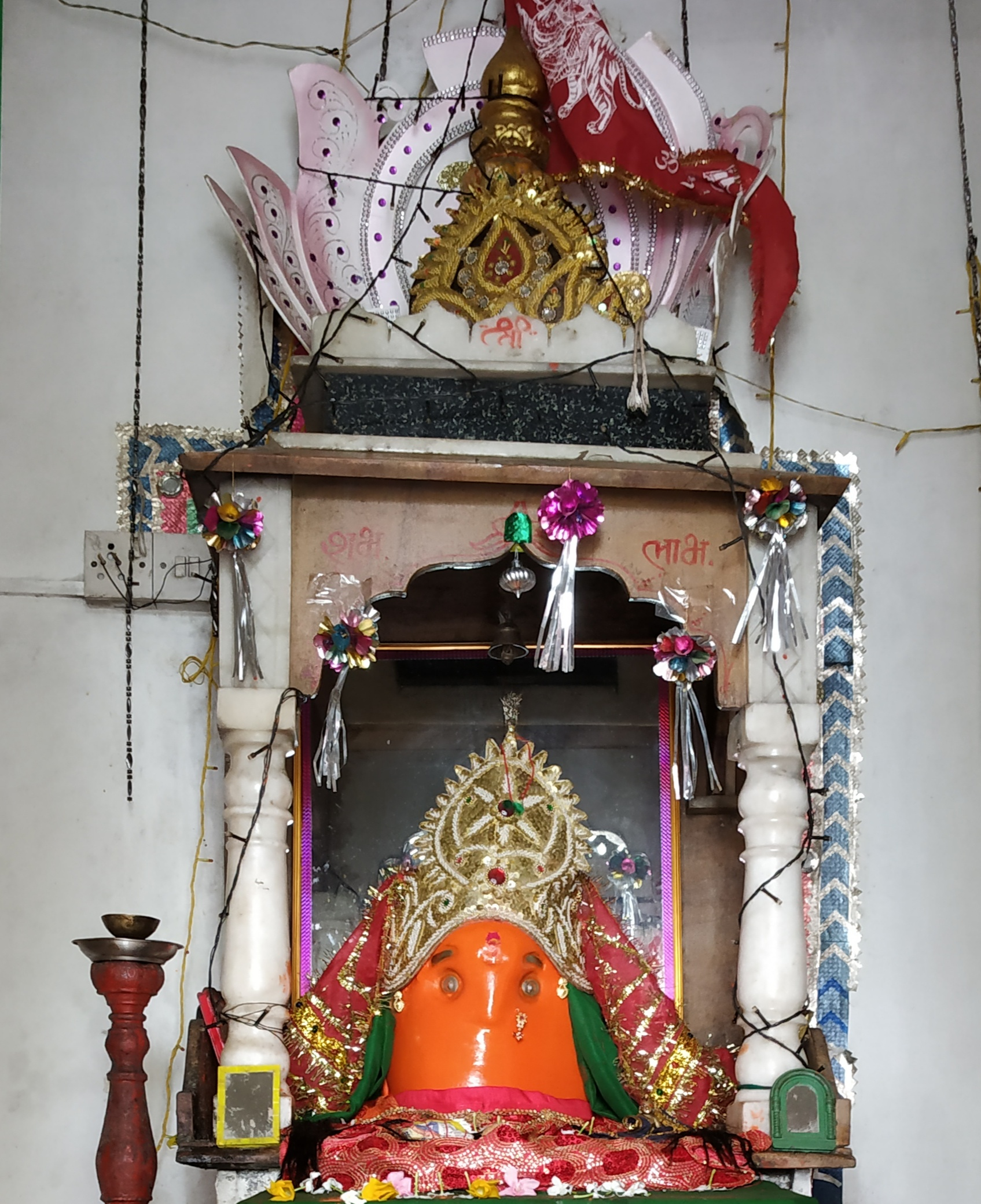

The most famous temple in Lodhikheda is Sangeet Dham Mandir, and is said to be one of the Swayambhu ("self-manifested") temples in the city. There are many sites in the city that testify the importance of the religion Mahakali Temple, Mata Mandir, Vitthal Mandir, Maa Sharda Mandir, Maa Tarini Mandir, Durga Temple, Shree Ram Mandir, Shiv Mandir, Shree Hanuman Mandir, Shri Shani Temple, Satyanarayan Temple, Jain Temple, Kabir Temple, Sunni Jama Masjid and Choti Masjid, Shri Taaran Taran Digamber Jain Temple, 1008 shri parasnath digamber temple, Mother Mary Church and Gurdwara Sri Guru Nanak Darbar

Religious events are observed in the city throughout the year. Ram Navami is celebrated in Nagpur with shobha yatra with a procession of floats depicting events from the Ramayana. Processions are also held on important festivals of other religions such as Dhamma Chakra Pravartan Din, Vijayadashami, Eid E Milad, Guru Nanak Jayanti, Mahavir Jayanti, Durga puja, Ganesh Chaturthi and Moharram. Like the rest of India, Nagpurkars celebrate major Hindu festivals like Diwali, Holi and Dussera with enthusiasm. Celebrations lasting for several days are held on Ganesh Chaturthi and Durga Puja festivals in virtually every small locality in the city.

== Industrial area ==
Lodhikheda is a Handloom Cluster & Raymond GroupThe Raymond Chhindwara plant, set up in 1991, is a state-of-the-art integrated manufacturing facility located 65 km away from Chhindwara. Built on 100 acres (0.40 km2) of land, the plant produces premium pure wool, wool blended and polyester viscose suiting. This plant has achieved a record production capacity of 14.65 million meters, giving it the distinction of being the single largest integrated worsted suiting unit in the world.
