= Symbiosis University of Applied Sciences =

Private university in Madhya Pradesh, India

- SUAS
- Other names: Symbiosis International University, Indore
- Motto: Skill Is Power
- Type: Education and research institution
- Established: 2016
- Affiliations: University Grants Commission (India) (UGC)
- Chancellor: S. B. Mujumdar
- Undergraduates: 822
- Location: Bangadda, Super Corridor, Indore, Madhya Pradesh, India; 22.753°N 75.795°E
- Website: www.suas.ac.in

Symbiosis University of Applied Sciences is a private university in Indore, Madhya Pradesh, India. It was established in 2016.

Symbiosis University of Applied Sciences (SUAS) in Indore is a pioneering skill university in India, dedicated to bridging the gap between education and industry needs through hands-on, practical training. Launched under the Symbiosis Open Education Society, it focuses on applied sciences across key sectors like technology, finance, and logistics.

== Undergraduate Degrees ==
- B.Tech (Computer Science & IT, Automation and Robotics) with specializations in AI, cybersecurity, and robotics.
- BBA (Retail & E-Commerce, BFSI, Digital Media & Marketing, Logistics & Supply Chain Management).
- Diploma in Manufacturing.

== Postgraduate studies ==
- MBA (BFSI, Digital Marketing, Logistics and Supply Chain Management, Retail Management)
- Executive MBA for professionals.
- M.Tech in CSIT emerging tech fields.
- PhD programs in engineering, management, and applied sciences.
