= Saoner =

- village
- Location in Maharashtra, India
- Coordinates: 21.3858107°N 78.9201379°E
- Country: India
- State: Maharashtra
- District: Nagpur

Government
  - Type: Municipal Council
  - Body: Savner Municipal Council

Area
  - Total: 15 km^{2} (5.8 sq mi)
  - Rank: 5th

Population (2011)
  - Total: 22,000
  - Rank: 9
  - Density: 1,500/km^{2} (3,800/sq mi)

Languages
  - Official: Marathi
- Time zone: UTC+5:30 (IST)
- PIN: 441107
- Telephone code: 07113
- Vehicle registration: MH-40
- Nearest city: Nagpur
- Literacy: 45%
- Vidhan Sabha representative: Dr. Ashish Deshmukh
- Climate: Healthy (Köppen)
- Website: www.savnernagarparishad.org.in
- lack of Basic amenities for savner (Good health care, Garden, Entertainment, Education, Sports etc…)

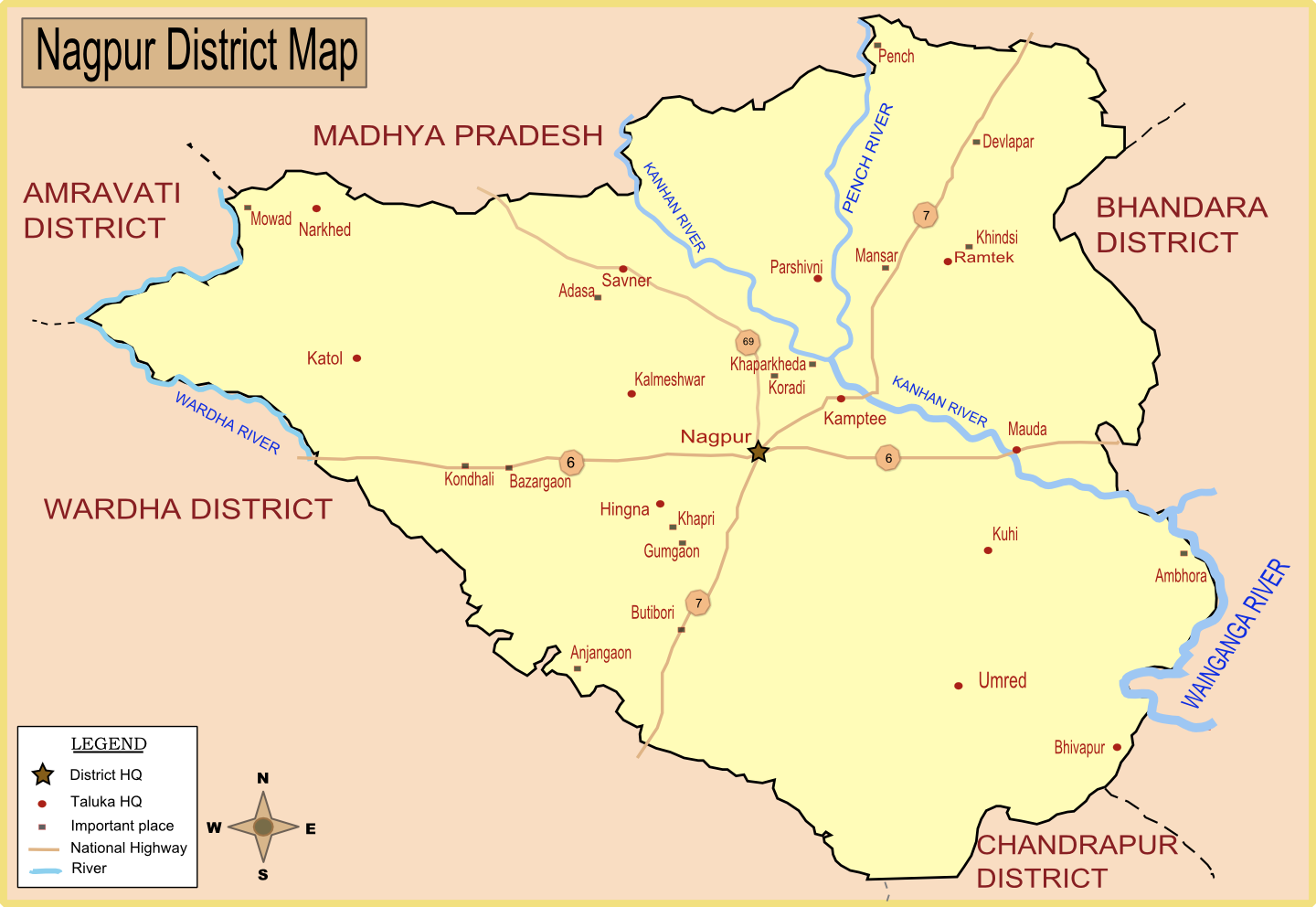
Map of Nagpur district with major towns and rivers.

Saoner is a city and tehsil headquarters in north part of Nagpur district in state of Maharashtra, India. The town is governed by Savner municipal council. It is 36 kilometres (22 mi) from Nagpur city. Saoner is located on the bank of Kolar River.

== History ==
Saoner is said to be mentioned in the Jaimini Ashwamedh under the name of Saraswatpur, and there are many legends connected with it. Ancient Shiv temple also known as Hemadpanti Shiv temple is also located near the bank of Kolar river. The ancient temple of Lord Ganesh is located at the neighboring village of Adasa on a hill. Saoner is also of historic importance due to its role in the 1942 Quit India Movement against the British. The region of Savner earlier was controlled by Hayihayavanshi Rajputs of Chhattisgarh; later, this region fell in the hands of the Nagpur Kingdom.

== Demographics ==
As of 2011 India census, the Savner Municipal Council has population of 32,498 of which 16,570 are males while 15,928 are females.

Population of Children with age of 0-6 is 3343 which is 10.29% of total population of Savner (M Cl). In Savner Municipal Council, Female Sex Ratio is of 961 against state average of 929. Moreover Child Sex Ratio in Savner is around 897 compared to Maharashtra state average of 894. Literacy rate of Savner city is 89.53% higher than state average of 82.34%. In Savner, Male literacy is around 93.29% while female literacy rate is 85.65%.

== Climate ==
Saoner has tropical wet and dry climate (Köppen climate classification) with dry conditions prevailing for most of the year. It receives about 163 mm of rainfall in June. The amount of rainfall is increased in July to 294 mm. Gradual decrease of rainfall has been observed from July to August (278 mm) and September (160 mm). The highest recorded daily rainfall was 304 mm on 14 July 1994. Summers are extremely hot, lasting from March to June, with May being the hottest month. Winter lasts from November to January, during which temperatures drop below 10 °C (50 °F). The highest recorded temperature in the city was 48 °C on 19 May 2015, while the lowest was 3.9 °C.

Climate data for Nagpur Airport (1971–1990)
Month	Jan	Feb	Mar	Apr	May	Jun	Jul	Aug	Sep	Oct	Nov	Dec	Year
Record high °C (°F)	36.6 (97.9)	39.2 (102.6)	45.0 (113.0)	46.1 (115.0)	47.8 (118.0)	47.7 (117.9)	40.6 (105.1)	37.8 (100.0)	38.9 (102.0)	39.5 (103.1)	35.6 (96.1)	39.7 (103.5)	47.8 (118.0)
Mean daily maximum °C (°F)	28.7 (83.7)	31.2 (88.2)	36.2 (97.2)	40.7 (105.3)	42.4 (108.3)	37.5 (99.5)	31.6 (88.9)	30.5 (86.9)	32.3 (90.1)	32.7 (90.9)	30.4 (86.7)	28.1 (82.6)	33.5 (92.3)
Daily mean °C (°F)	20.8 (69.4)	23.2 (73.8)	27.7 (81.9)	32.5 (90.5)	35.1 (95.2)	31.9 (89.4)	27.9 (82.2)	27.1 (80.8)	27.7 (81.9)	26.4 (79.5)	23.0 (73.4)	20.4 (68.7)	27.0 (80.6)
Mean daily minimum °C (°F)	12.9 (55.2)	15.1 (59.2)	19.2 (66.6)	24.3 (75.7)	27.8 (82.0)	26.3 (79.3)	24.1 (75.4)	23.6 (74.5)	23.1 (73.6)	20.0 (68.0)	15.5 (59.9)	12.6 (54.7)	20.4 (68.7)
Record low °C (°F)	3.9 (39.0)	5.0 (41.0)	8.3 (46.9)	13.9 (57.0)	19.4 (66.9)	20.0 (68.0)	19.4 (66.9)	18.3 (64.9)	16.6 (61.9)	11.6 (52.9)	6.7 (44.1)	5.5 (41.9)	3.9 (39.0)
Average precipitation mm (inches)	12.5 (0.49)	20.7 (0.81)	17.6 (0.69)	14.3 (0.56)	19.2 (0.76)	190.1 (7.48)	341.7 (13.45)	280.5 (11.04)	183.1 (7.21)	56.8 (2.24)	16.6 (0.65)	13.2 (0.52)	1,166.3 (45.92)
Average rainy days (≥ 1.0 mm)	1.8	2.2	1.9	1.2	2.9	11.4	17.5	16.5	10.4	4.0	1.3	1.1	72.2
Average relative humidity (%)	54	43	30	24	27	55	77	80	74	61	55	56	53
Mean monthly sunshine hours	272.0	268.3	287.6	290.8	293.8	186.6	115.4	116.7	182.5	260.4	264.1	268.8	2,807
Source 1: NOAA
Source 2: India Meteorological Department (record high and low up to 2010)

Extreme Weather

The average number of Heat wave days occurring in Saoner in the Summer months of March, April & May is 0.5, 2.4 and 7.2 days respectively. May is the most uncomfortable and hottest month with, for example, 18 days of heat waves being experienced in 1973, 1988 and 2010. The summer season is characterized by other severe weather activity like thunderstorms, dust storms, hailstorms and squalls. Generally, hailstorms occur during March and dust storms during March and April. These occur infrequently (0.1 per day). Squalls occur more frequently with 0.3 per day in March and April rising to 0.8 per day in May.

== Culture ==
The residents of Saoner celebrate the festivals of it's various communities, including Pola (Festival of Bullocks), Eid, Christmas, Holi and Diwali. Marathi writer Ram Ganesh Gadkari died here.

The local language is Marathi.

== Places ==
Adasa is a historical and ritual place of Hindu. It has a big Ganesh temple. It is 8 km from Saoner.

Dhapewada is the place which is famous for temple of lord Vitthal this place is also known as “Pandharapur of vidarbha” the Rathyatara of Dhapewada is known in whole Maharashtra.

Waki is famous in whole india for the sufi saint Hazarat Baba Tajuddin there are annual fair organised in waki every Hindu Muslim join this fair.

Kapileshwar Temple is located in Kelvad, around 12 km from Saoner. The site contains a Shiva temple and a statue of Shiva, as well as a waterfall called Nanda Mukha. Kelvad has limited infrastructure and poor road conditions.

Navnath Temple ( Telankhedi) - Around 6 km from Saoner, the temple situated around lack of Talenkhedi, had Rushimuni statue over there. The lack of good road infrastructure often a critique.

Heti ( Nandaji Buva Temple) - ancient temple situated 5 km from Saoner, Must to visited place one a years .

== Economy ==
Coal mining and textile and paper industries are the primary financial growth drivers. The primary occupation of Saoner residents is agriculture. Saoner is part of Ramtek (Lok Sabha constituency). Most of the bridges and government buildings were built by the British Government in the late 1930s. WCL (Western Coalfields India Limited) has 5 under ground(UG) coal mines, coal is mined and transported with the help of railway wagons to Khaparkheda Thermal Powerhouse. A weekly market is held on Fridays.

== Transportation ==
Saoner is well connected to Nagpur by railway and road. State Government of Maharashtra and Madhya Pradesh operate stage carrier bus service, besides private autos (12 people sitting )and Cycle Rickshaws . The NH 47 highway passes via Saoner.
