= Rangri dialect (Malvi) =

Malvi dialect of India

Rangri
- रंगरी
- Native to: India
- Language family: Indo-European: Indo-Iranian; Indo-Aryan; Western; Rajasthani; Malvi; Rangri

Language codes
- ISO 639-3: –
- Glottolog: rang1263 Rangri rang1262 Rangari

Rangri is a dialect of the Malvi language of India. It is heavily mixed with Marwadi.
