= Kanhan (Pipri) =

- big city
- Location in Maharashtra, India
- Coordinates: 21.230°N 79.237°E
- Country: India
- State: Maharashtra
- District: Nagpur

Population (2001)
  - Total: 21,840

Languages
  - Official: Marathi
- Time zone: UTC+5:30 (IST)
- PIN: 441401
- Telephone code: 07102
- Vehicle registration: MH-40

Kanhan (Pipri) is a city in Nagpur district in the Indian state of Maharashtra.

== Demographics ==
As of the 2001 India census, Kanhan (Pipri) had a population of 21,840. Males constitute 51% of the population and females 49%. Kanhan (Pipri) has an average literacy rate of 74%, higher than the national average of 59.5%: male literacy is 79%, and female literacy is 67%. In Kanhan (Pipri), 12% of the population is under 6 years of age. Famous river in Kanhan. Very famous SAI BABA Temple in Kanhan. Situated on the banks of River kanhan and named after it. It was predominantly an industrial town on National Highway no. 7 and railway route connecting Mumbai and Kolkata. Kanhan (Pipri) comes under Ramtek Lok Sabha (Lok Sabha Segment) and Kamthi Vidhan Sabha (Vidhan Sabha Segment). The city is an upcoming metro city. KANHAN is popularly known as coal city because of its extensive coal mines.

Year	Male	Female	Total Population	Change	Religion (%)							
Year	Male	Female	Total Population	Change	Hindu	Muslim	Christian	Sikhs	Buddhist	Jain	Other religions and persuasions	Religion not stated
2001	11167	10675	21842	-	76.637	2.756	0.879	0.169	19.330	0.197	0.027	0.005
2011	11669	11276	22945	5.050	77.511	3.395	0.741	0.205	17.590	0.092	0.017	0.449
