= Pandhurna District =

Pandhurana district
- District of Madhya Pradesh
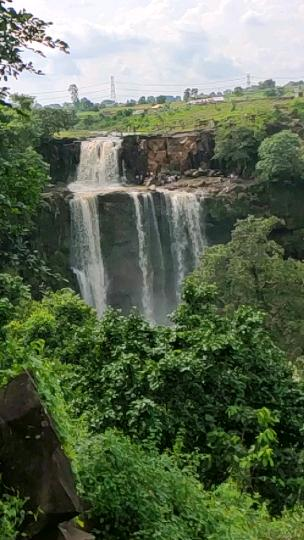
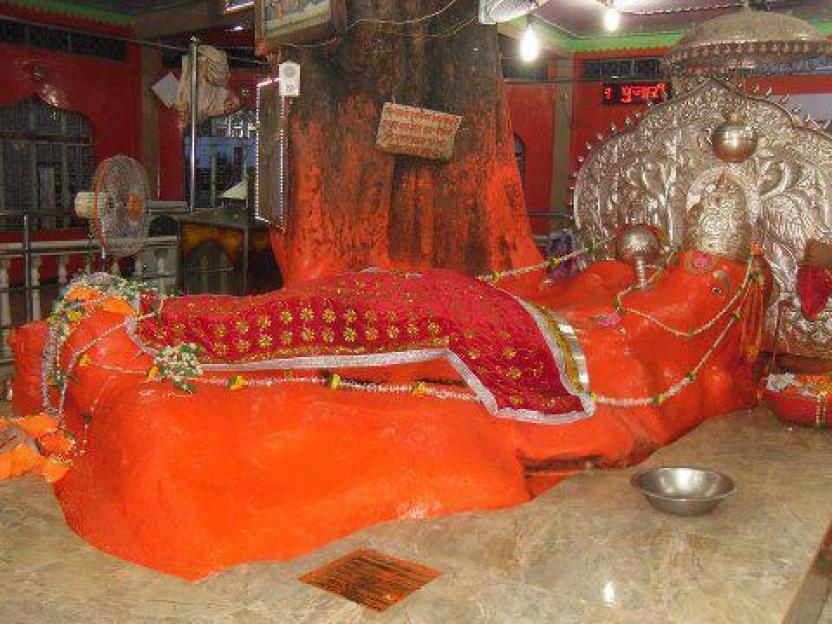
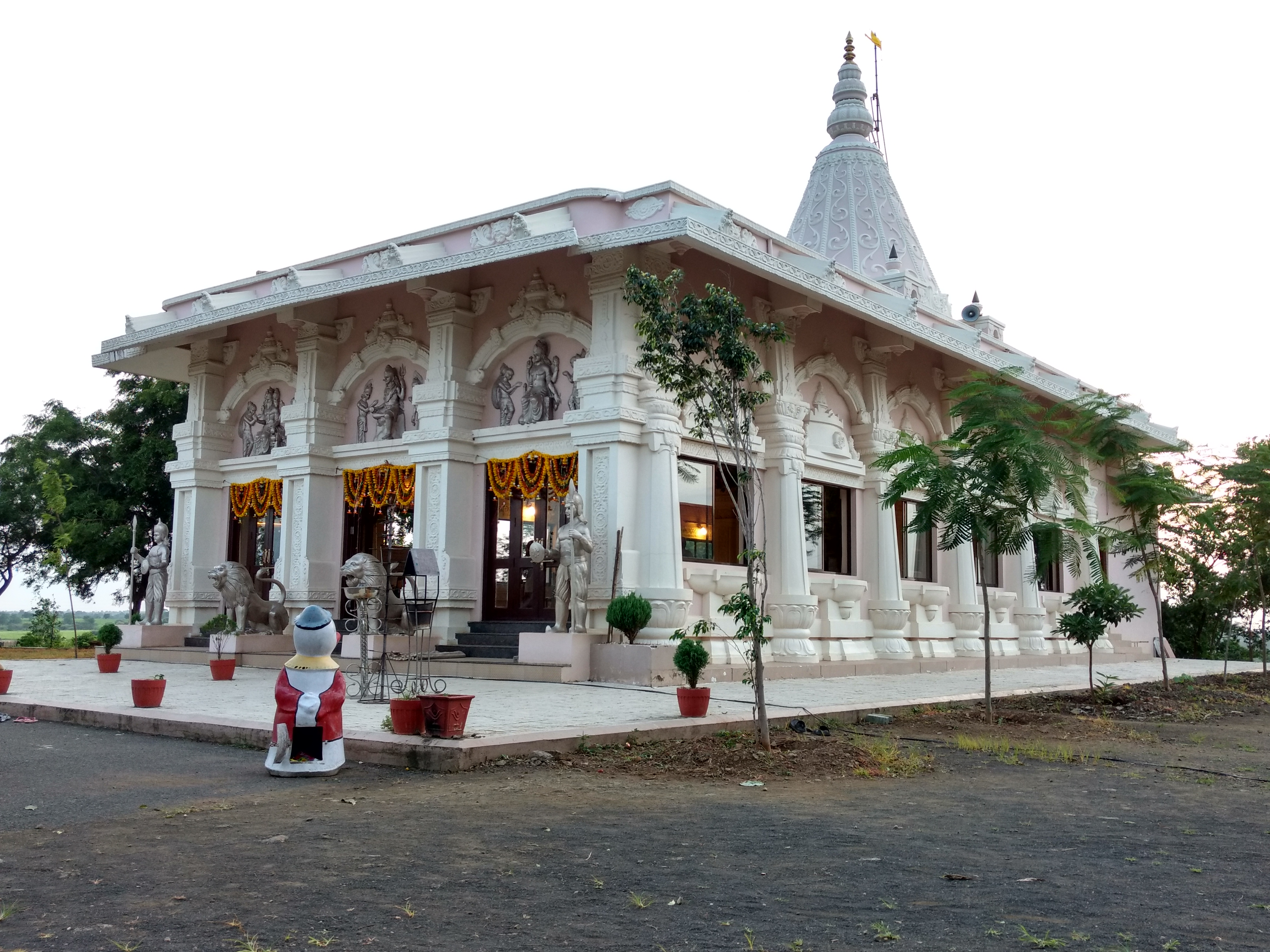
- Jamsawli Hanuman, Sausar; Kukdikhapa Waterfall; Sai Mandir, Pandhurna

- Coordinates: 21°59′N 78°52′E
- Country: India
- State: Madhya Pradesh
- Division: Jabalpur Division
- Established: 5 October 2023
- Headquarters: Pandhurna
- Tehsils: 1. Pandhurna; 2. Sausar; 3. Nandanwadi (Sub Tehsil)

Government
  - District collector: Ajay Dev Sharma (IAS)
  - Lok Sabha constituencies: 1. Chhindwara (shared with Chhindwara district)
  - Vidhan Sabha constituencies: 2 (Pandhurna and Sausar)

Area
  - Total: 1,522.22 km^{2} (587.73 sq mi)

Population (2011)
  - Total: 374,310
  - Density: 245.90/km^{2} (636.87/sq mi)

Demographics

Languages
  - Official: Hindi and Marathi
- Time zone: UTC+05:30 (IST)
- Website: Pandurna.nic.in

Pandhurna district (Hindi pronunciation: [pãːɖʱʊɾn̪aː]) is the 54th district (according to the Madhya Pradesh Gazette) of Madhya Pradesh state and 9th district of Jabalpur division, which came into existence in the year 2023 after separating from Chhindwara district. It is the least populous district of the state. Its administrative headquarter is in Pandhurna city.

== Geography ==
The area of the district is 1522.22 km^{2}. It is bounded by the districts of Nagpur in the southeast, Betul and Amravati in the west, and Chhindwara in the north. Jam River and Kanhan River is major river of the district.

== Demographics ==
Religions in Pandhurna district (2011)
Religion	Percent
Hinduism	88.20%
Buddhism	4.92%
Islam	3.53%
Other (tribal religion)	2.93%
Other or not stated	0.42%

Pandhurna district had a population of 374,310. Pandhurna has a sex ratio of 948 females per 1000 males and a literacy rate of 78.93%. 29.09% of the population lives in urban areas. Scheduled Castes and Scheduled Tribes made up 37,456 (10.01%) and 96,515 (25.78%) of the population respectively.

Languages of Pandhurna district (2011)
1. Marathi (49.7%)
2. Hindi (20.4%)
3. Gondi (19.5%)
4. Pawari (Bhoyari) (7.65%)
5. Korku (1.88%)
6. Others (0.90%)

At the time of the 2011 Census of India, 49.70% of the population in present Pandhurna district spoke Marathi, 20.37% Hindi, 19.50% Gondi, 7.65% Pawari (Bhoyari) and 1.88% Korku as their first language.

== Government ==
There are two Vidhan Sabha constituencies in the district: Pandhurna and Sausar. Both are part of Chhindwara Lok Sabha

== Economy ==
The economy of the district is mainly dependent on agriculture. Oranges are produced in the district, and it is famous for its orange fields There are also some big industries in the district, and Pandhurna has a multinational company called DryTech situated at Nagpur road.

Amongst other large scale industries are Super Pack (Bajaj) at Village Sawli near Sausar, district Pandhurna and Bhansali Engineering Polymers at village Satnur near Sausar, P.B.M. Polytex Ltd. at village Borgaon near Sausar and Suryawanshi Spinning Mills at village Rajna near Pandhurna.

== Culture ==
=== Places to visit ===
- Hazrat Guncha Shah Wali Dargah, Pandhurna
- Hazrat Baba Farid Dargah, Badchicholi
- Jam Sawli Hanuman Mandir
- Ardhanarishwar Jyotirlinga, Mohgaon
- Sai Tekri, Pandhurna
- Shani Mandir
- Juna Pandhurna
- Lilahi Waterfalls
- Ghoghra Waterfall, near Sausar

=== Gotmar Mela ===
Gotmar Fair of Pandhurna is celebrated every year on Bhadrapada ‘Amavasya’ on the second day of Pola festival in Pandhurna city. This fair is celebrated on the banks of the river Jam.

== Transport ==
Pandhurna district is well connected by roads and railway.

The nearest airport is Nagpur Airport. Many flights are available between Nagpur and other major airports in India. Pandhurna is also accessible via Bhopal and Jabalpur, which is also connected by air with other major cities of India.

Pandhurna railway station is located in the Central Railway zone, on the Nagpur Itarsi railway route. The other major district station is Sausar (located on the South East Central Railway zone on Chhindwara Nagpur rail line).

The city is situated on National Highway-47 (NH-47). The nearest cities are Nagpur and Chhindwara. This is the simplest and easiest route to Pandhurna.
