= SEY =

SEY, Sey or sey may refer to:

== Codes ==
- SEY, Air Seychelles ICAO airline code
- SEY, Indian Railways station code for Seoni railway station, Madhya Pradesh
- SEY, Seychelles IOC country code
- SEY, Seymour railway station station code
- sey, Secoya language ISO 639-3 code

== People ==
- Sey (surname)
- Sey Chassler (1919–1997), American magazine editor and writer, longtime editor-in-chief of Redbook

== See also ==
- Seys, a surname
