= Anuppur Thermal Power Project =

Power station in Madhya Pradesh, India

- Country: India
- Location: Anuppur District, Madhya Pradesh
- Coordinates: 23°03′54″N 81°47′07″E
- Status: Operational
- Construction began: June 2015
- Commission date: April 2016
- Operator: Hindustan Powerprojects

Thermal power station
- Primary fuel: Coal

Power generation
- Nameplate capacity: 2520 MW

The Anuppur Thermal Power Project or ATPP as popularly cited is a 2520-megawatt (MW) coal-based thermal power station located in Anuppur District, Madhya Pradesh, India. The project is being commissioned by Hindustan Powerprojects (formerly Moser Baer).

== Key People ==
- Ratul Puri Chairman Hindustan Power
- Raghav Trivedi — President Thermal
- Bashant Kumar Mishra;— Project Head

== Offices ==
The company has its office at following places.

Delhi — Okhla Phase III

Bhopal — Rivierra Town

Anuppur — Kotma Road

== Phase I ==
A sub-project with estimated output of 1200 MW, comprising two 600 MW subcritical units, is under construction as of June 2015. Lanco is the EPC Contractor.

Water for the project is being taken from the Son River. Coal is being procured from Coal India Limited's South Eastern Coalfields mines located in Madhya Pradesh and Chhattisgarh.

The entire operation is spread over four villages: Laharpur Murra, Guwari, Belia, and Jaithari. Environmental clearance for Phase I was received in May 2010 from MoEF Delhi. Consent to Operate authorization has also been received from the Madhya Pradesh Pollution Control Board.

COD achieved in May 2015 for Unit One. COD achieved in April 2016 for Unit Two.

PPA update: 70 per cent of the power being generated in the plant will be sold to Madhya Pradesh and Uttar Pradesh at tariffs between Rs. 3.60 a unit and Rs. 3.80 a unit.

== Phase II ==
ATPP Phase II of the power project, with expected output of 1320 MW and consisting of two 660 MW super-critical units, is in pre-development phase as of January 2015. Company applied for Environmental Clearance for this second phase in April 2014.

== See also ==
- Satpura Thermal Power Station
- Sanjay Gandhi Thermal Power Station
- Amarkantak Thermal Power Station
