= Pathakhera =

- Town
- Location within Madhya Pradesh
- Coordinates: 22.0601°N 78.1032°E
- Country: India
- State: Madhya Pradesh
- District: Betul

Government
  - State legislative Constituency: Amla
  - Parliamentary Constituency: Betul
  - Administration: Sarni Municipal Council
- Elevation: 508 m (1,667 ft)

Population (2011)
  - Total: 14,430

Languages
  - Official: Hindi
- Time zone: UTC+5:30 (IST)
- Postal code: 460449
- Telephone code: 07146
- ISO 3166 code: IN-MP
- Vehicle registration: MP48

Pathakhera is a town in the municipal council of Sarni in the Betul District, Madhya Pradesh, India. The town is also known as Coal Nagari and also locally as NCDC, an acronym for National Coal Development Corporation.

== History and research on coalfields ==
In 1845, the earliest systematic exploration of India's coal resources was initiated by D.H.Williams, Geological Surveyor of the East India Company. In 1924, Dr. Cyril Fox surveyed once again certain coal-bearing areas, including the Pench, Kanhan and Tawa Valleys. Pathakhera is a part of Satpura Basin coal area as categorized by Geological survey of India. Greater Pathakhera or Pathakhera Area consists of Shobhapur colony, Kalimai and Bagdona, in addition to Pathakhera town, which was essentially created as western extension of Pench-Kanhan-Tawa valley coalfields project. In the vicinity of Pathakhera three coal seams have been encountered by boring. The top seam is of poor quality and the other seams are comparatively better in quality. Researchers of Birbal Sahni Institute of Palaeobotany, Lucknow has discovered the correlation of Gondwana coalfields with plant fossil data. Another research on the analysis of coal sample has shown presence of fossils of 61 species of 37 genera. Researchers have also suggested the presence of Permian period fossil in this region and the species mark the transition of the Permian level into the Lower Triassic. Coal from this region is usually subbituminous A to high volatile A bituminous rank.

== Culture ==
People in Pathakhera are associated with different religious beliefs. Major part of the population follows Hinduism, while significant numbers of Muslims, Buddhists, Christians and Jains are also present.

This small town houses number of Hindu temples, a Mosque and a Buddhist temple. The notable religious places includes Shiv Mandir, Vishwakarma Mandir, Gayatri Mandir, Shitla Devi Mandir, Pathakhera Masjid and Panchsheel Buddha Vihar.

== Geography ==
Pathakhera is located at coordinates 23.2943|N|78.1032|E| near the geographical center point of modern India. It has an average elevation of 508 m (1,669 ft). The town is a sister town of nearby town Sarni, which is famous for Satpura Thermal Power Station and Baba Mathardev temple.

The town is situated between Betul Plateau and Satpura mountain range. The town is surrounded by dense forest.

== Transportation ==
Pathakhera is situated on Betul- Parasia state highway 19B and well connected to different cities of the state by road. It is 45 km away from district headquarters Betul and 175 km away from State capital Bhopal.

The nearest railway station is Ghoradongri, which is situated 15 km from the town. The closest airport is Raja Bhoj airport which is 180 km away from Pathakhera.

== Economy ==
Pathakhera is one of the key industrial town in Betul district. Pathakhera along with neighbouring towns- Shobhapur and Bagdona is known as Pathakhera area regulated by Western coalfields limited (WCL) headquartered at Nagpur.

Pathakhera was a dense forest area between 1960 and 1970, a part of Satpura Valley. It was then leased by WCL from forest department.

At present, there are eight coal mines of Western Coalfields (a subsidiary of Coal India Limited) in Pathakhera area, delivering coal to Satpura Thermal Power Station. WCL Pathakhera area has a record to win Madhya Pradesh government's Bhamashah Award for one of the highest taxpaying entity in state.

In addition to Coal production, Ash brick micro industry, individual shops, clinics, schools and weekly & daily vegetable market also contribute to small scale economy.

== Facilities ==
Healthcare: The biggest hospital in area is WCL Area hospital owned by WCL for the benefit of its employees. WCL also maintains two WCL dispensaries- one in Pathakhera and other in Shobhapur colony. Non-employees can use WCL facilities in case of emergency or with the permission of Chief Medical Officer of area hospital. State government has two governmental primary health center and one Urban health center. Other healthcare facilities includes private clinics, ayurvedic clinics, diagnostic laboratories and Medical stores.

Nursery: MP Government sanctioned a 4 hectares nursery in 1980.

Animal care:One Government animal hospital is situated in Bajrang colony, Pathakhera for the benefit of animal owners in area.

NGOs: Many non-governmental organizations are also working in the area mostly focusing upon society's issues and skill development.

== Education ==
Education in area includes high schools, colleges and vocational training institutes.

Schools:

- Government Higher Secondary School, Pathakhera
- Little Flower Higher Secondary School
- Govt Girls Primary School Pathakhera
- Govt Girls Middle School Pathakhera
- Govt Girls Higher Secondary School Pathakhera
- MGM Higher Secondary School Bagdona
- Gyandeep Higher Secondary School
- TSS School Shobhapur
- Tarun Shikhar High School
- Pragya High School

Colleges: in area are recognized by UGC and MP Department of education for Bachelors and Masters courses in Science, Arts and Commerce related subjects.

- Govt. College, Bagdona
- Indira Gandhi Kanya Mahavidyalaya, Shobhapur colony

Vocational training institutes are popular among the youth of the area and nearby villages.

== Administration ==
The town administration falls under jurisdiction of Municipal Council Sarni. Police jurisdiction comes under the Sarni Police Station. Ghoradongri is taluka office for the town while Shahpur serves as sub distrist revenue office.

== Township management ==
Pathakhera town is mainly managed by WCL Management as the town mostly house WCL employees. The management includes electricity supply, water supply, housing, roads, educational, medical and sanitation facilities. Sarni Municipal Council takes care of the facilities for non-employees public in the town.

The apex authority of all coal mines as well as of the townships is Chief General Manager.
