= Ganga Sajjan Singh Uikey =

Indian politician

Ganga Sajjan Singh Uikey (born 1974) is an Indian politician from Madhya Pradesh. She is an MLA from Ghoradongri Assembly Constituency which is reserved for ST community in Betul District. She represents Bharatiya Janata Party. She won the 2023 Madhya Pradesh Legislative Assembly election.

== Early life and education ==
Ganga comes from an agricultural family in Ghoradongri, Betul district. Her late husband Sajjan Singh was a former MLA from Ghoradongri. She completed her graduation in 2000 at a college affiliated with Barkatullah University, Bhopal.

== Career ==
Ganga won the 2023 Madhya Pradesh Legislative Assembly election from Ghoradongri Assembly Constituency representing Bharatiya Janata Party. She defeated Rahul Uikey of Indian National Congress by a narrow margin of 4,213 votes.
