= Amarkantak Thermal Power Station =

Coal power plant in Madhya Pradesh, India

- Country: India
- Location: Chachai, Anuppur, Madhya Pradesh
- Coordinates: 23°09′50″N 81°38′16″E
- Status: Operational
- Commission date: 1977
- Operator: MPPGCL

Thermal power station
- Primary fuel: Coal

Power generation
- Units operational: 1
- Nameplate capacity: 210 MW

Amarkantak Thermal Power Plant is located in Chachai, near Amlai railway station on Bilaspur-Katni section of SE Railway. It is situated at Anuppur district of Madhya Pradesh, India. The power plant is one of the Coal-fired power station of MPPGCL

== Power plant ==
Amarkantak Thermal Power Station has an installed capacity of 210.00 MW. The first unit was commissioned in March 1977. The water for the plant has been procured from the nearby Sutna Nala Dam which is constructed on the Sone river and spread across 700 acres (2.8 km^{2}). The coal for the plant has been procured by rail from the mines of South Eastern Coalfields Limited

== Installed capacity ==
Stage	Unit Number	Installed Capacity (MW)	Date of Commissioning	Status	TG Set Supplier	Boiler Supplier
First	1	120	November,1977	Decommissioned on 13/01/2015	BHEL	ABL
First	2	120	May,1978	Decommissioned on 01/05/2014	BHEL	ABL
Second	3	210	June, 2008	Operational	BHEL	BHEL

== See also ==
- Satpura Thermal Power Station
- Sanjay Gandhi Thermal Power Station Pradesh
- Shree Singaji Thermal Power Project
- Anuppur Thermal Power Project
