= Shilpa Raizada =

Indian television actress (born 1990)

- Born: Shilpa Raizada; 12 July 1990 (age 36); Pathakhera, Betul, Madhya Pradesh, India
- Occupation: Television actress
- Years active: 2010–2021
- Known for: Hamari Devrani, Veer Shivaji, Krishnaben Khakhrawala, Jodha Akbar, Dilli Wali Thakur Girls, Yeh Rishta Kya Kehlata Hai:

Shilpa Raizada (born 12 July 1990) is an Indian television actress. She is known for her roles of Padmini in Star Plus's Hamari Devrani, Begum Rukhsar in Colors TV's Veer Shivaji, Shehnaaz in Zee TV's Jodha Akbar and Binny in And TV's Dilli Wali Thakur Gurls. She was seen as Surekha Akhilesh Goenka in Yeh Rishta Kya Kehlata Hai on Star Plus from 2016 to 2021.

== Personal life ==
Shilpa Raizada was born on 12 July 1990 in Pathakhera, Betul district, Madhya Pradesh, India. Raizada has completed her schooling from Little Flower High School, Pathakhera. From childhood Raizada always wanted to be an actor. In her home town Pathakhera there is no college, it is a coal mines area and a very small town, so she came to Bhopal, did her graduation from Mvm College. In Bhopal she did anchoring for Aaj Tak news channel, covered development stories on tribal people of state of Madhya Pradesh. In Bhopal she auditioned for her debut show Hamari Devrani and got selected. She has elder sister, Suman Raizada and two brothers, Saumitra and Siddharth Raizada.

== Career ==
She started her career with Star Plus's daily soap afternoon show Hamari Devrani. She got nominated for negative lead role. After this show she continued to be busy with many shows like in Mata Ki Chowki as Sita, Jodha Akbar as Shehnaaz, Dilli Wali Thakur Gurls as Binnni. She was last seen as Surekha Akhilesh Goenka in Yeh Rishta Kya Kehlata Hai from 2016 to 2021. 2023 now she is doing RAMAYAN JAI SHRI RAM AS SITA with Puneet Issar who is playing RAVAN, Vindu Dara singh playing hanuman and ram playing by Siddhant issar, it’s a live theatre,

== Television ==
Year	Serial	Role	Ref(s)
2010	Hamari Devrani	Padmini	
2011	Veer Shivaji	Begam Rukhsar	
2011	Krishnaben Khakhrawala	Binni	
2013	Jodha Akbar	Shehnaaz	
2015	Dilli Wali Thakur Gurls	Binny	
2015	Killerr Karaoke Atkah Toh Latka	Herself	
2016–2021	Yeh Rishta Kya Kehlata Hai	Surekha Akhilesh Goenka	
