= Sarni, India =

Sarni
- Town
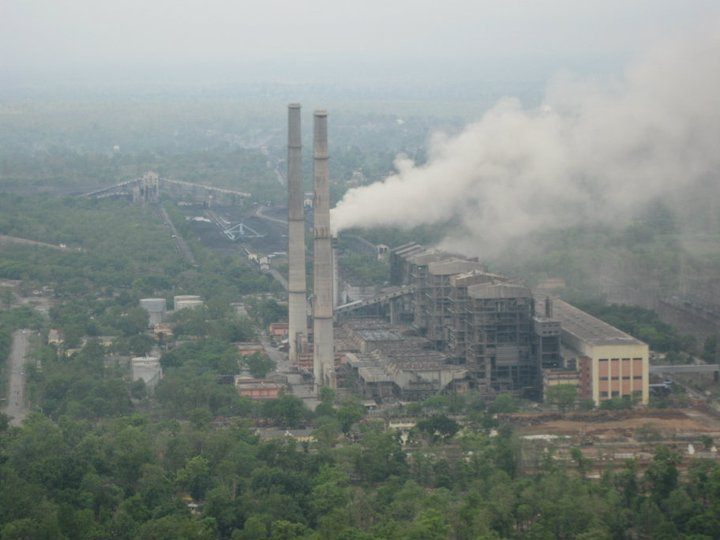
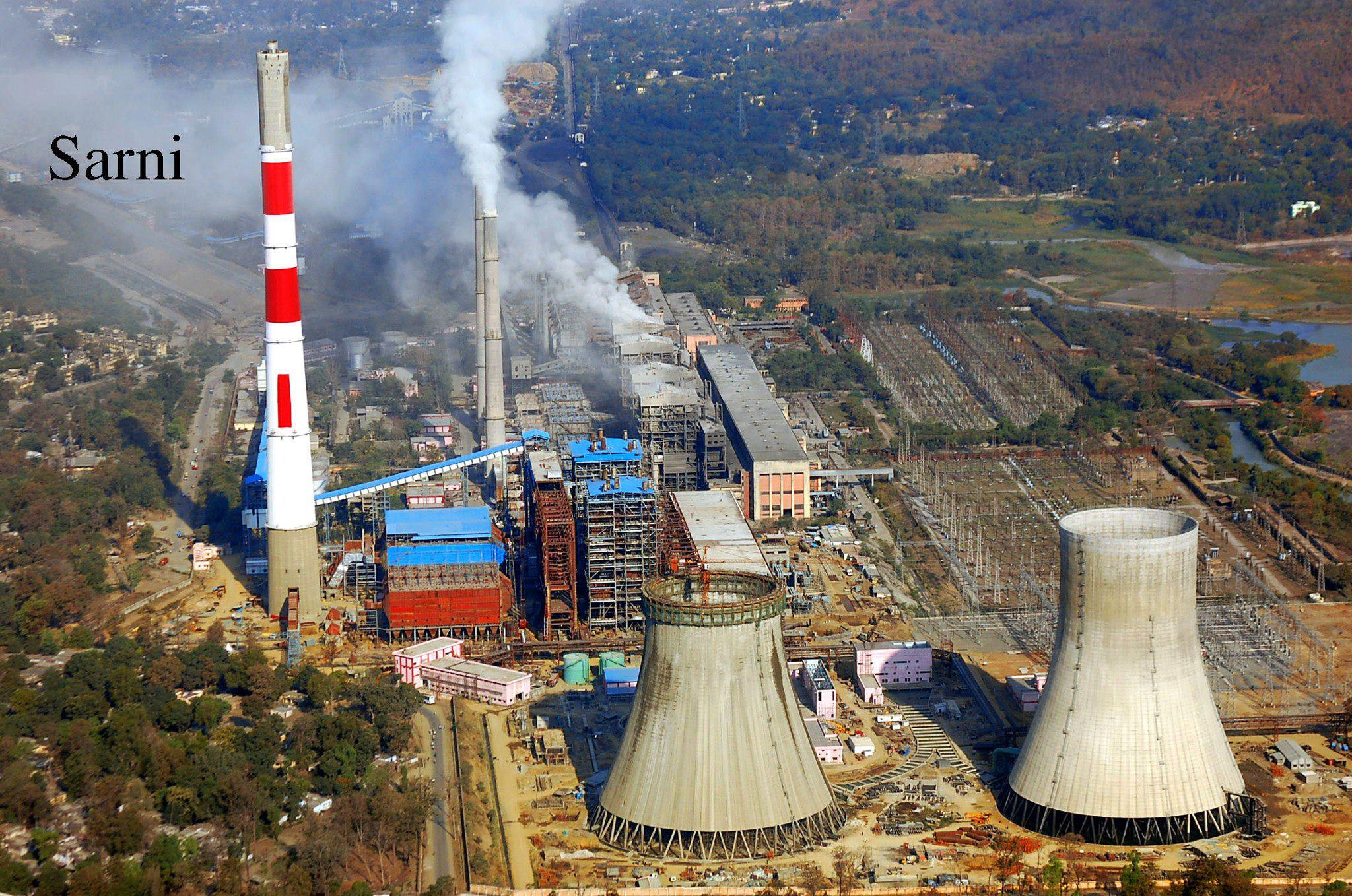
- Satpura Thermal Power Plant Sarni

- Location in Madhya Pradesh, India
- Coordinates: 22.104°N 78.173°E
- Country: India
- State: Madhya Pradesh
- District: Betul

Government
  - Constituency: Amla
  - Administration: Municipal Council Sarni - Sarni + Pathakhera + Sobhapur Colony + Bagdona

Area
  - Total: 35 km^{2} (14 sq mi)
- Elevation: 450 m (1,480 ft)

Population (2011)
  - Total: 86,141
  - Density: 2,432/km^{2} (6,300/sq mi)

Languages
  - Official: Hindi
- Time zone: UTC+5:30 (IST)
- PIN: Sarni 460447, Pathakhera 460449
- Telephone code: 07146
- Vehicle registration: MP48
- Website: http://nagarpalikasarni.com

Sarni is a town located in the Betul District of Madhya Pradesh. It is administered by the Municipal Council of Sarni, which oversees the four contiguous settlements of Sarni, Pathakhera, Shobhapur Colony and Bagdona.

The town is known for its industry, but also its natural beauty, with the Tawa River running through it and surrounding forests. It is an important industrial hub with the Satpura Thermal Power Station and Pathakhera Area Coal Mines of Western Coalfields Limited located in the surrounding areas. These industries contribute to the economy of the town, and make it an important centre for power generation and coal mining. Sarni is also known for its Mathardev temple at the hilltop, making it a popular tourist destination.

== History ==
Sarni, along with Pathakhera, Shobhapur Colony and Bagdona were established as project towns for the Satpura Thermal Power Station and Pathakhera Area Coalmines in the 1960s. This was done by land acquisition, clearing and development along the banks of Tawa River.

The construction of Satpura Thermal Power Station began in 1964, and the first unit of 62.7 MW was commissioned in October 1967. The Satpura Dam was also built to provide water to the station.

== Transport ==
Transportation in Sarni is primarily served by road and railway. The nearest airports are Raja Bhoj International Airport in Bhopal, approximately 200 km (120 mi) north of Sarni, and Dr. Babasaheb Ambedkar International Airport in Nagpur, approximately 225 km (140 mi) south of Sarni.

The nearest railway station is Ghoradongri railway station, which is 18 km (11 mi) from Sarni. A road connects Sarni to Nagpur-Bhopal National Highway (NH 69) at Baretha, making it accessible from both nearby airports of Bhopal and Nagpur.

Additionally, Sarni is connected to Chhindwara through Madhya Pradesh State Highway 43 (Betul-Sarni-Parasia).

== Demographics ==
At the 2011 census, the Sarni Municipality had a population of 86,141 of which 44,928 were males while 41,213 were females. The population of children with age of 0-6 was 8096, which was 9.40% of total population of Sarni.

The total literacy rate of Sarni was 84.59% in 2011, which was greater than the average literacy rate of 69.32% in Madhya Pradesh. Out of the total 66,018 literates, 36,675 were male while 29,343 were female. The male literacy rate was 90.05% and the female literacy rate was 78.63%.

Schedule Caste (SC) constituted 25% of the population, while Schedule Tribe (ST) were 9.5% of the total population of Sarni.

== Weather ==
The coldest month is January and the warmest month is May. The yearly average rainfall of the city is 1069.2 mm (42.09 in). Average maximum temperature is 42.5 °C (108.5 °F) and average minimum temperature is 5.4 °C (41.7 °F).

== Municipal Council of Sarni ==
The Municipal Council of Sarni consists of 36 Wards (13 in Sarni, 17 in Pathakhera, 1 in Sobhapur Colony, and 6 in Bagdona). There is one president and one vice president of the municipal committee, who are responsible for its proper functioning.

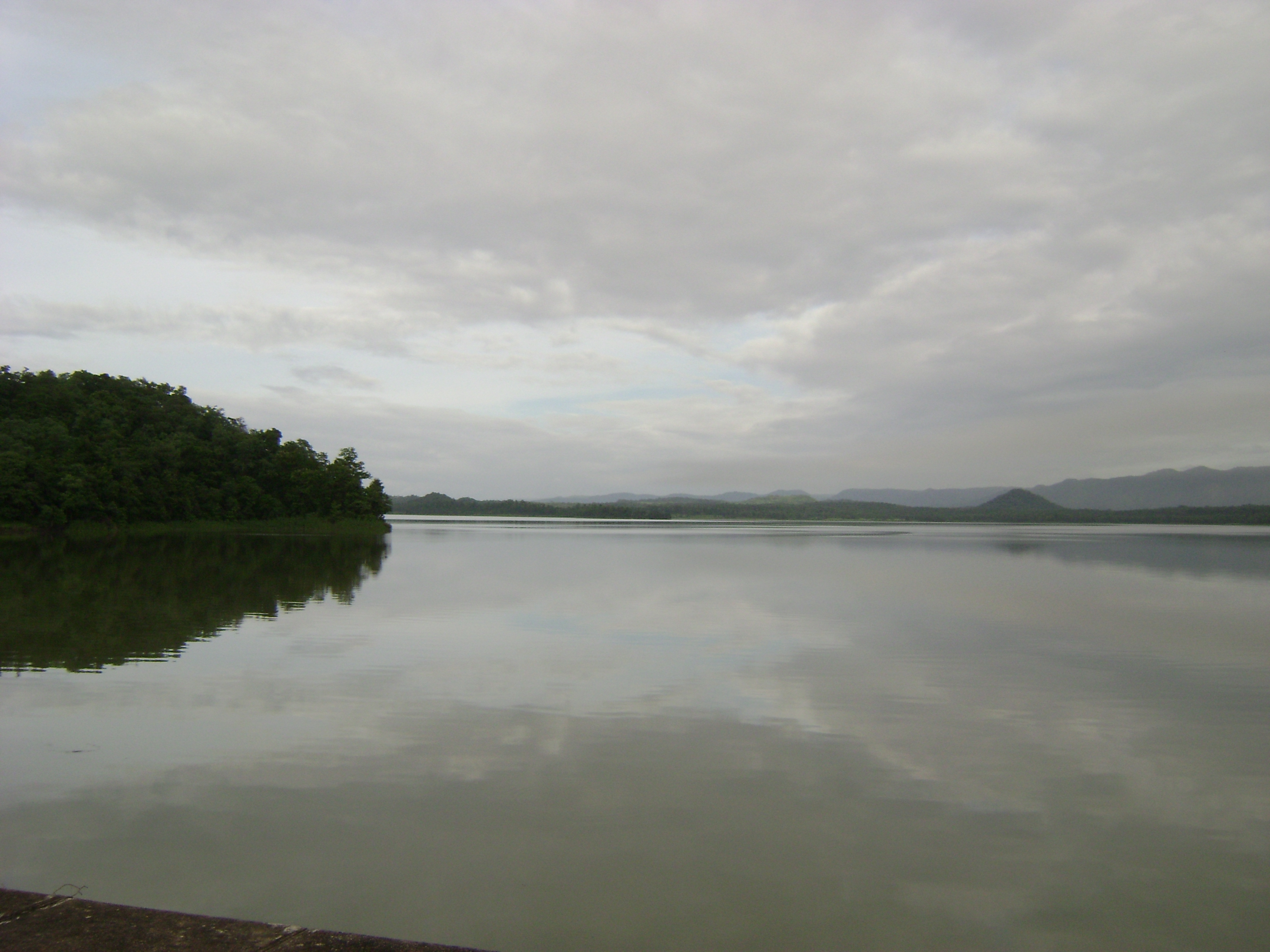
Satpura Dam

== Festivals ==
In addition to major religious festivals and national Indian festivals, Sarni also celebrates an annual fortnight-long fair on the festival of Makar Sankranti in January.

The fair is organised by the Mathardev Mela Samiti temple committee, with the help of the Municipal Council of Sarni. Traders across the region come to the fair to sell goods including religious items, artefacts, ornaments, clothes, toys, simple household goods, etc. Acrobats, snake charmers, musicians and other artists also attract crowds.

== Places of interest ==
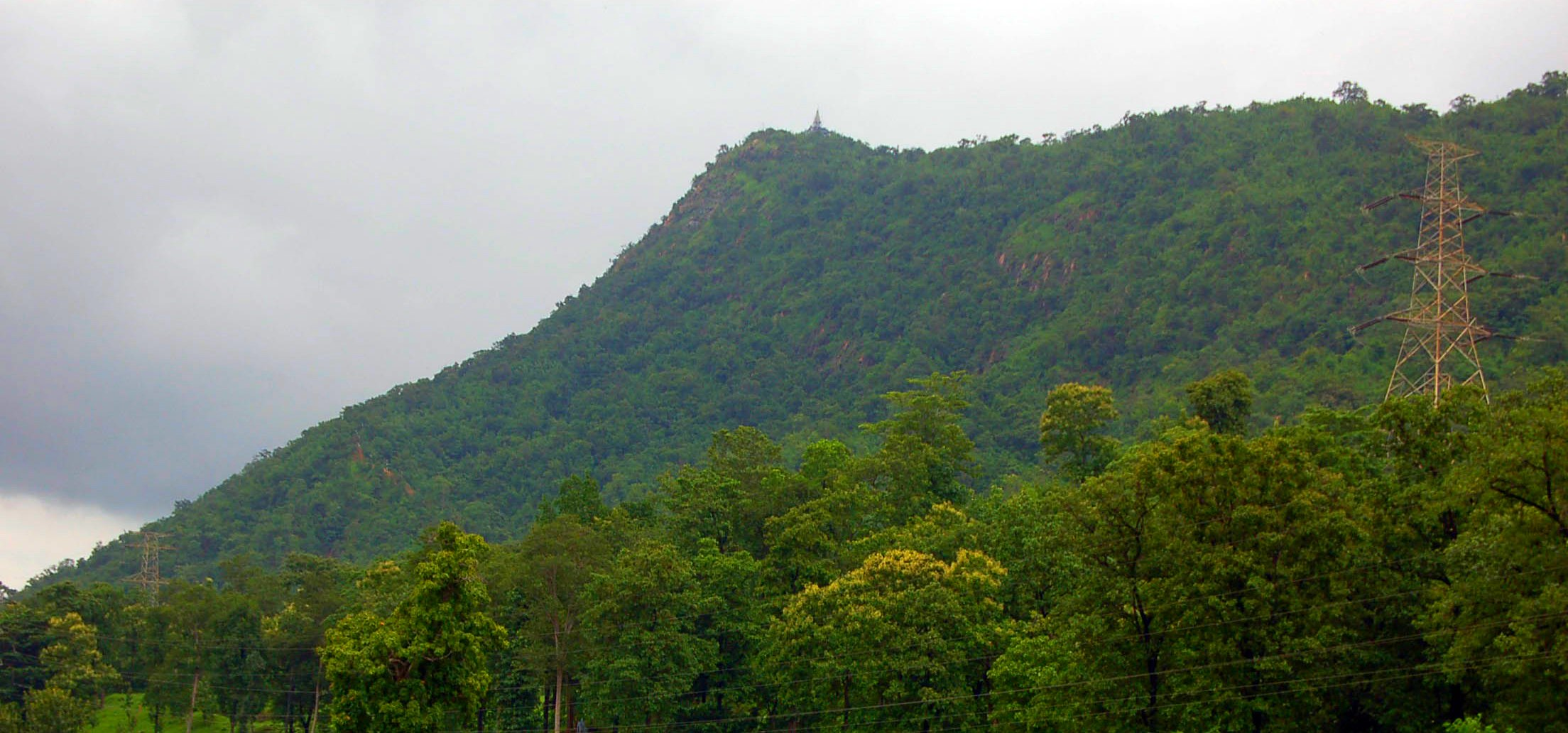
View of forest in Monsoons

Sarni is surrounded by the Satpura mountains. In the vicinity are the Satpura hill ranges, valleys, plains, deep valleys, dense forests and water bodies including rivers, fountains and a dam.

=== Mathardev Temple ===
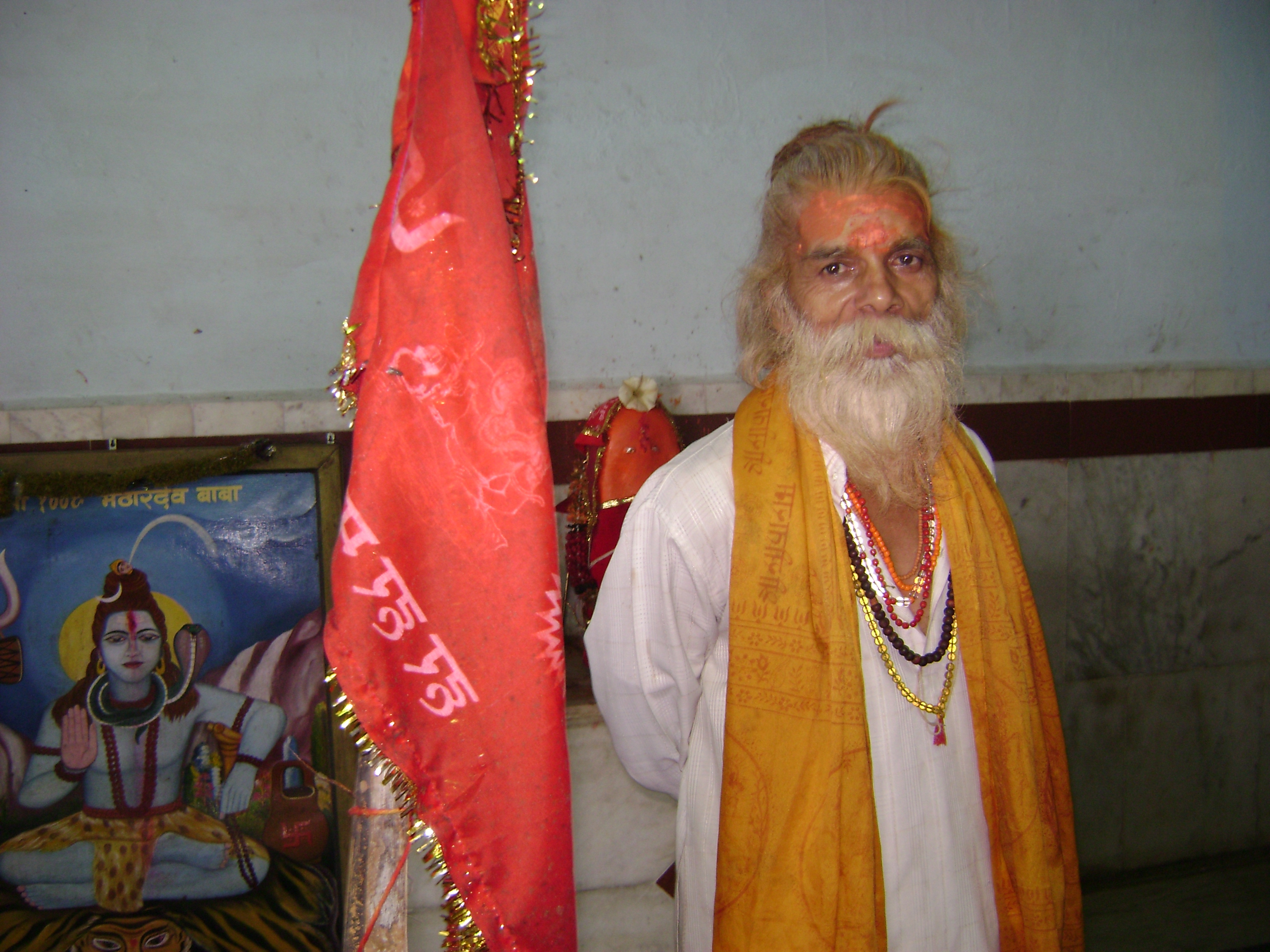
The priest at Mathardev temple

One of the most conspicuous sites of Sarni is a Shiva temple overlooking the town from Mathardev peak, which is the highest point of the Satpura ranges, approximately 3,500 ft (1,100 m) above sea level. The peak, as well as the temple, are named after a legendary tribal chief named Mathardev. The legendary chief still commands a strong following among the local and neighbouring population.

=== Satpura Dam ===
Satpura Dam is a man-made lake created as a reservoir for the Power Plant. The reservoir is surrounded by dense forests and hills. A road traverses through a local hillock to reach the lake and is used for leisurely walks by the local populace.

== Satpura Thermal Power Station ==
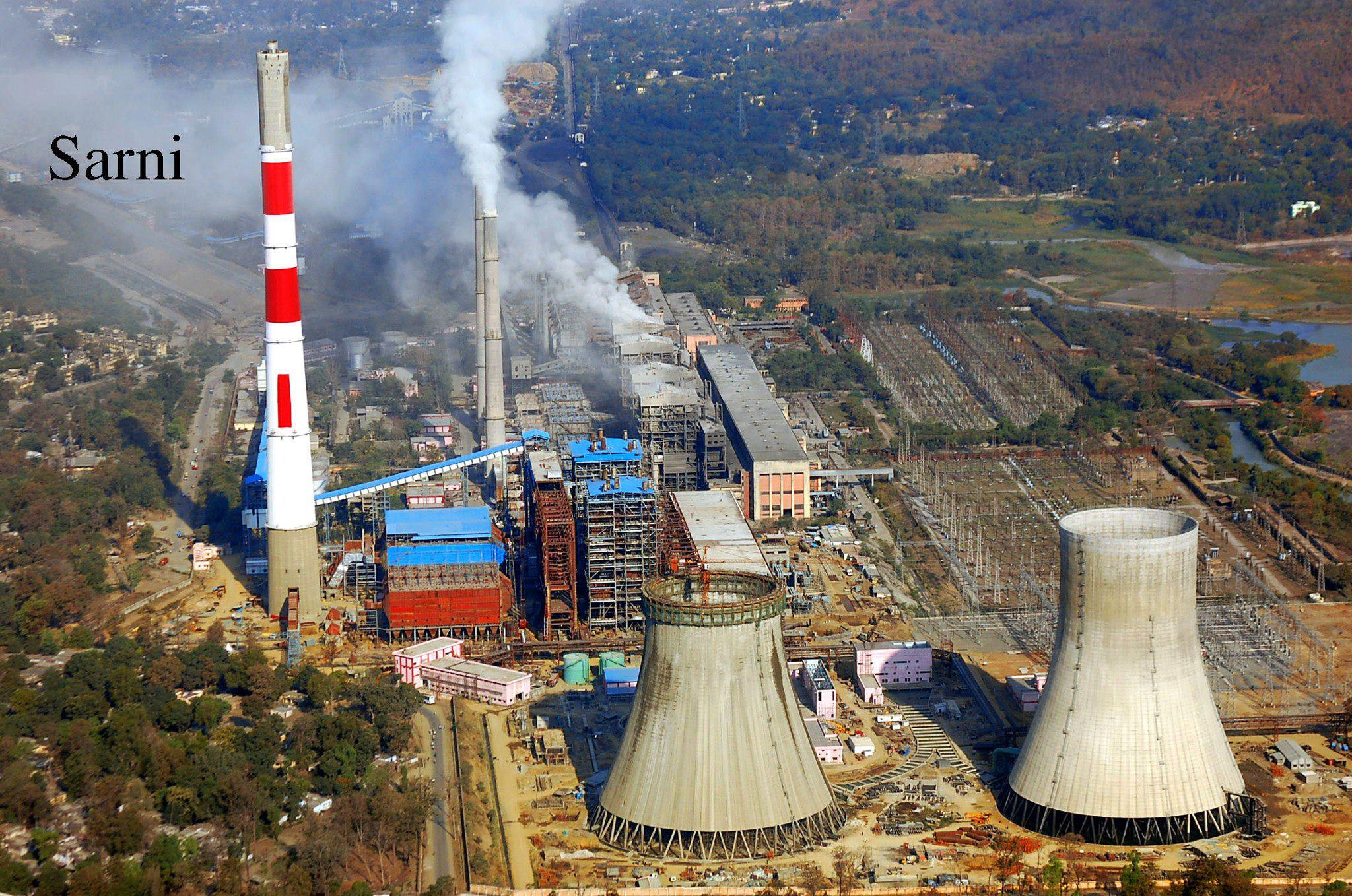
Satpura thermal power plant by Ashish Kumar Prajapati

Sarni is home to the Satpura Thermal Power Station, a Coal-fired power station that has an installed capacity of 1330 MW, making it the third-largest power plant of MPPGCL.
