= Ghoradongri Assembly constituency =

Constituency of the Madhya Pradesh legislative assembly in India

Coordinates: 22.12°N 78.00°E

Ghoradongri
- Constituency No. 132 for the Madhya Pradesh Legislative Assembly

Constituency details
- Country: India
- Region: Central India
- State: Madhya Pradesh
- District: Betul
- Lok Sabha constituency: Betul
- Established: 1962
- Reservation: ST

Member of Legislative Assembly
- 16th Madhya Pradesh Legislative Assembly
- Incumbent Ganga Sajjan Singh Uikey
- Party: Bharatiya Janata Party
- Elected year: 2023
- Preceded by: Brahma Bhalavi

Ghoradongri is one of the 230 Vidhan Sabha (Legislative Assembly) constituencies of Madhya Pradesh state in central India. Ghoradingri comes under Betul (Lok Sabha constituency). It is a reserved seat for the Scheduled tribes (ST).

== Members of the Legislative Assembly ==
Election	Name	Party
1962	Jangusingh Nizam	Bharatiya Jana Sangh
1967	Madu	Bharatiya Jana Sangh
1972	Bishram Gurdi	Indian National Congress
1977	Jangusingh Uike	Janata Party
1980	Ramjilal Uike Manju	Bharatiya Janata Party
1985	Meera	Indian National Congress
1990	Ramjilal Uike Manju	Bharatiya Janata Party
1993	Pratap Singh Mokham Singh	Indian National Congress
1998	Pratap Singh Mokham Singh	Indian National Congress
2003	Sajjan Singh Uike	Bharatiya Janata Party
2008	Gita Ramjilal Uikey	Bharatiya Janata Party
2013	Sajjan Singh Uike	Bharatiya Janata Party
2016^	Mangal Singh Dhurve	Bharatiya Janata Party
2018	Brahma Bhalavi	Indian National Congress
2023	Ganga Sajjan Singh Uikey	Bharatiya Janata Party

== Election results ==
=== 2023 ===
2023 Madhya Pradesh Legislative Assembly election: Ghoradongri
Party	Candidate	Votes	%	±%
BJP	Ganga Sajjan Singh Uikey	103,710	47.38	+9.59
INC	Rahul Uikey	99,497	45.45	−1.47
Independent	Smita Raja Dhurve	6,150	2.81	
GGP	Kaushal Kishore Partety	2,823	1.29	−2.94
NOTA	None of the above	3,997	1.83	−0.99
Majority		4,213	1.93	−7.2
Turnout		218,909	84.09	−0.37
BJP gain from INC		Swing		

=== 2018 ===
2018 Madhya Pradesh Legislative Assembly election: Ghoradongri
Party	Candidate	Votes	%	±%
INC	Bramha Bhalavi	92,106	46.92	
BJP	Geeta Ramjilal Uikey	74,179	37.79	
GGP	Kaushal Parte	8,305	4.23	
SP	Pratap Singh Uike	3,962	2.02	
BSP	Ashok Bhalavi	3,331	1.7	
Independent	Shyamlal Bete	2,498	1.27	
Independent	Shrimati Mangeetabai Uikay	2,243	1.14	
NOTA	None of the above	5,542	2.82	
Majority		17,927	9.13	
Turnout		196,289	84.46	
INC gain from BJP		Swing		

=== 2016 bypoll ===
Ghoradongri Assembly constituency by-election, 2016: Ghoradongri
Party	Candidate	Votes	%	±%
BJP	Mangal Singh Dhurve			
INC	Pratap Singh Uikey			
Majority				
Turnout				
gain from		Swing		

== See also ==
- Ghoradongri
- Betul (Lok Sabha constituency)
