= Seoni, Madhya Pradesh =

Seoni
- City
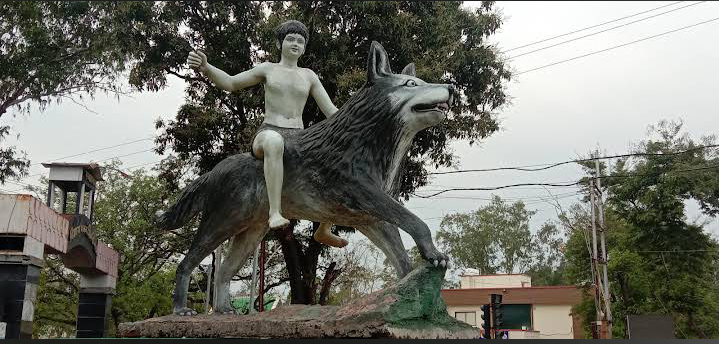
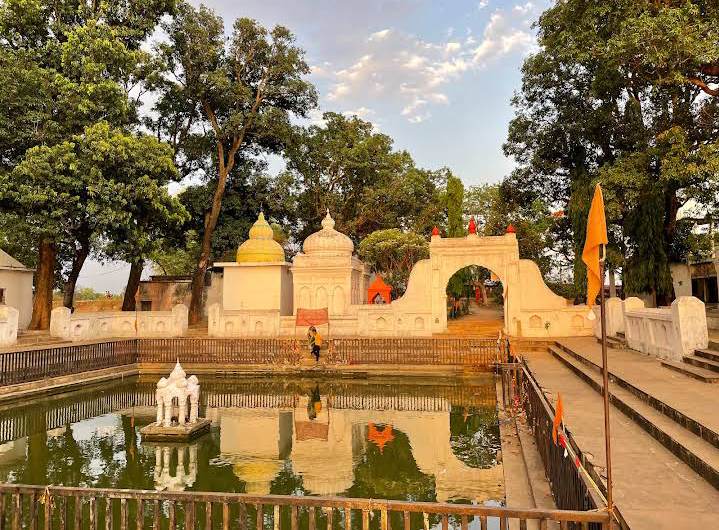
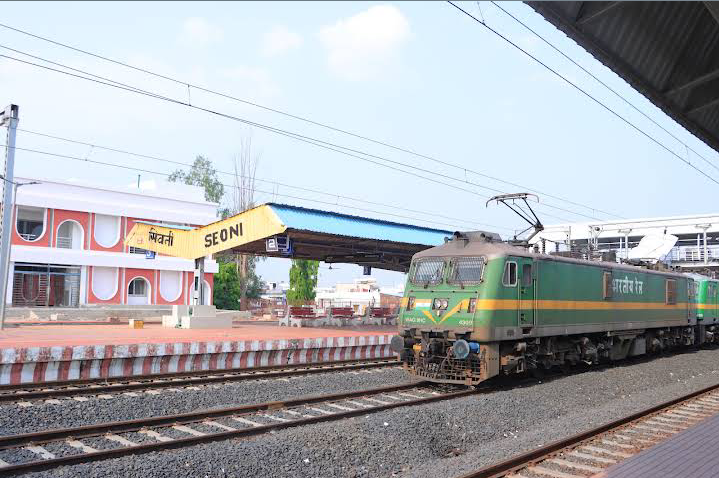
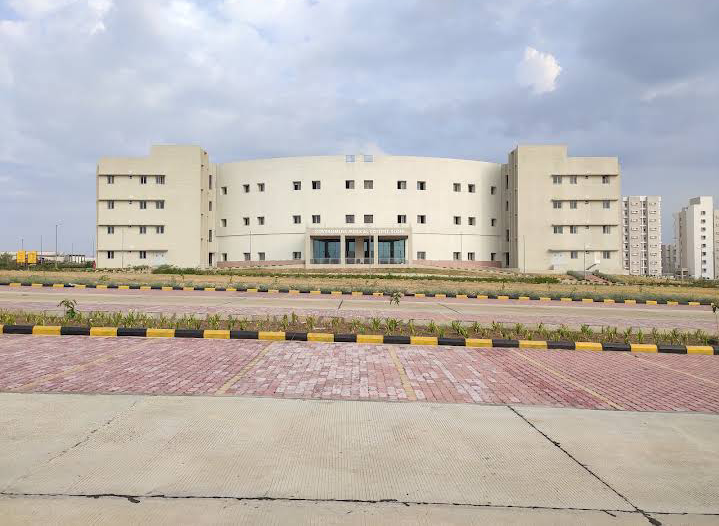
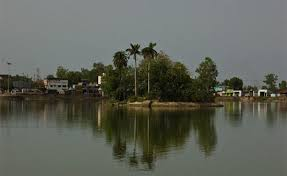
- Mowgli Statue In Seoni, Mundara Wainganga Origin, Seoni Medical College, Seoni Railway Station, Dal Sagar lake

- Location in Madhya Pradesh, India Seoni (India)
- Coordinates: 22°05′N 79°32′E
- Country: India
- State: Madhya Pradesh
- District: Seoni
- Established: 1867

Government
  - Type: Nagar Palika
  - Body: Municipal Corporation Seoni
  - District Magistrate: Ms. Anju Arun Kumar , IAS
  - District Police Chief: Shri Krishna lalchandani, IPS

Area
  - Total: 50 km^{2} (19 sq mi)
- Elevation: 611 m (2,005 ft)

Population
  - Total: 102,343
  - Rank: 30th (MP)
  - Density: 2,000/km^{2} (5,300/sq mi)

Languages
  - Official: Hindi.
- Time zone: UTC+5:30 (IST)
- PIN: 480661
- Telephone code: 07692
- ISO 3166 code: IN-MP
- Vehicle registration: MP-22
- Website: seoni.nic.in, seoni.mppolice.gov.in

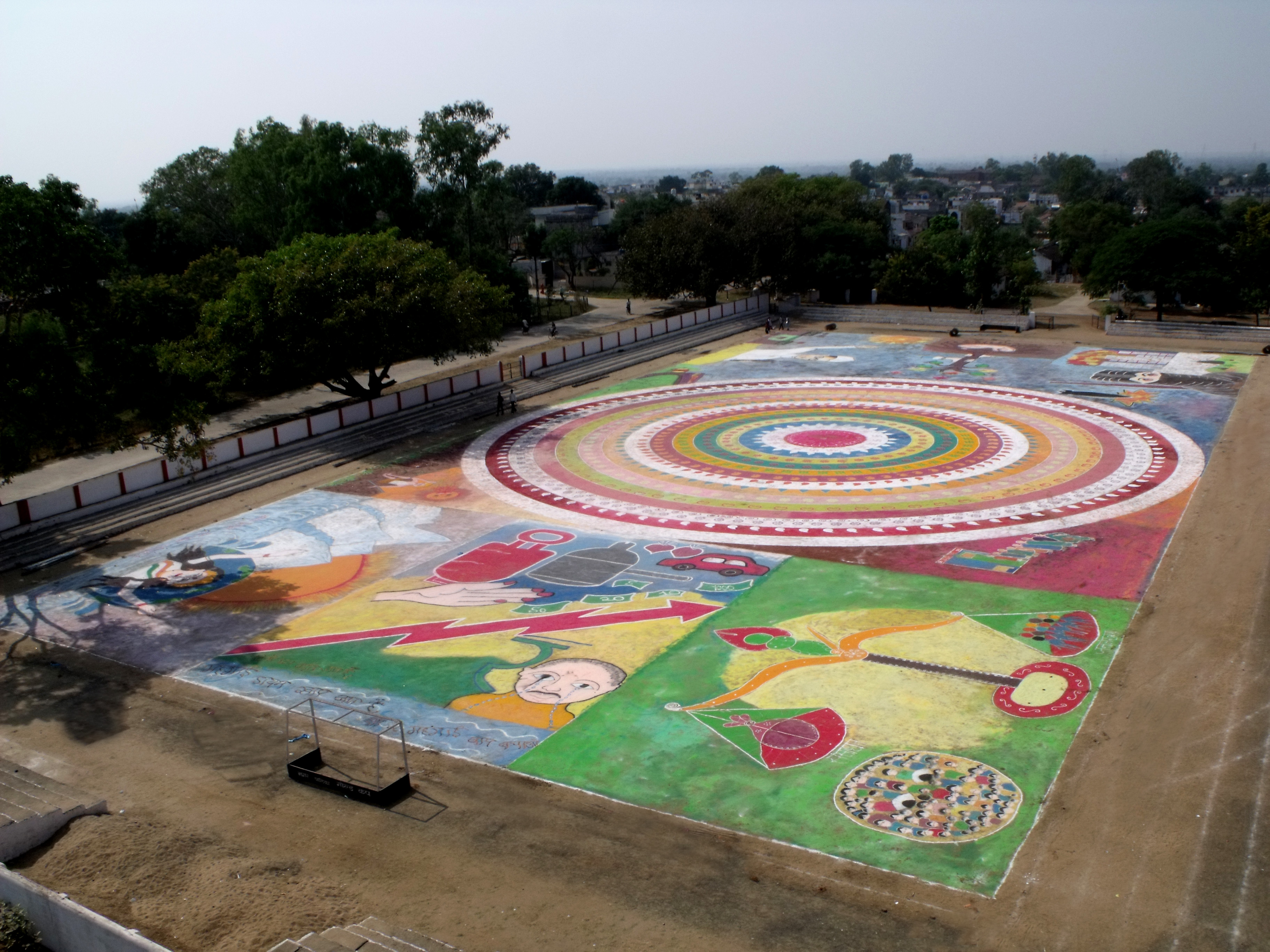
Police ground, Seoni

Seoni, formerly spelled Seeonee, is a city and a municipality in Seoni district in the Indian state of Madhya Pradesh.

Rudyard Kipling used the forests of the Satpura Range in the vicinity of Seoni as the setting for the Mowgli stories collected as The Jungle Book and The Second Jungle Book in 1894 and 1895. Seoni is a city where the Wainganga, a tributary of the river Godavari, originates.

Seoni is reachable by train and road. Major adjacent cities are Nagpur and Jabalpur. The National Highway 44 north–south corridor passes through Seoni. Seoni Railway Station serves as the primary transportation hub for Seoni district and connects Seoni city to the National capital (New Delhi) and the State capital (Bhopal) directly via express trains. The nearest airport is Nagpur (130 km); a small airport (air-strip) is available at Seoni near Sukhtara village for landing charter airplanes/helicopters.

The Wainganga is a river in India originating in the Mahadeo Hills in Mundara near the village Gopalganj in Seoni, Madhya Pradesh. It is a key tributary of the Godavari. The river flows south in a winding course through the states of Madhya Pradesh and Maharashtra, roughly 579 km (360 mi). After joining the Wardha River, the united stream, which is known as the Pranahita River, empties into the Godavari River at Kaleshwaram, Telangana.

The Jumbo Sitapahal of Madhya Pradesh (jumbo custard apple), a large-fruited variety of custard apple, received Geographical Indication (GI) registration in 2026. Associated with the Seoni district, this distinctive fruit is known for its large size. The GI registration recognizes its geographical identity and association with the region.

== History ==
Seoni was founded in 1774 by Diwan Muhammad Amin Khan, who moved his administrative headquaters here from nearby Chhapara. Following the Third Anglo-Maratha War in 1818, the town came under British rule as the heaquarters of Seoni district in the Central Provinces, and its municipality was formed in 1867. By 1901, the town had a population of 11,884 and served as a local commercial center on the road between Nagpur, and Jabalpur.

== Geography ==
Seoni is located at 22.08°N 79.53°E. It has an average elevation of 611 metres (2005 feet).

The city, which is halfway between Nagpur and Jabalpur, is 2,005 feet above sea level.. As of 2011, the city had a population of 102,343. It was founded in 1774, and contains large public gardens, a market place and a tank dalsagar. It has 37% forest cover. Seoni district is located in the south-eastern part of Madhya Pradesh. Geographically, the district extends over an area of 8758 sm^{2}. It is bordered by Jabalpur, Narsinghpur and Mandla districts to the north, Balaghat to the east and Chhindwara to the west and shares its southern boundary with Nagpur (Maharashtra).

== Transport ==
Roadways

National Highway 44 is the longest highway of India that connects Kanyakumari-Srinagar and passes through the district from north to south and part of India's ambitious road project North–South–East–West Corridor. India's first-ever light and soundproof elevated road are being built on National Highway 44 that passes through Pench Tiger Reserve in Seoni, Madhya Pradesh. It is India's first corridor for wild animals, this cave-like underpass connects two wildlife parks (Kanha National Park and Pench National Park), and could be vital for the long-term viability of tiger populations in the central Indian landscape.

National Highway 347 starts from Multai and terminates at Seoni. It is a branch of National Highway 47. It connects two primary highways, NH 47 and NH 44.

Fair weather roads connect major towns in the district.

Railways

On 24 April 2023, the first broad-gauge passenger train (Chhindwara - Nainpur Passenger), flagged off virtually by Indian Prime Minister Narendra Modi, departed from Seoni Railway Station (station code : SEY). This launch by Indian Railways heralds a new era of electrified broad gauge line connectivity to Seoni.

At present, a couple of express trains namely Patalkot Express, Pench Valley Express originate from Seoni Railway Station and connect Seoni to the national capital New Delhi, the state capital Bhopal, and other major cities like Indore, Gwalior.

Apart from these, Nagpur - Shahdol Express 11201 & Shahdol - Nagpur Express 11202, Rewa - Itwari Express 11756 & Itwari - Rewa Express 11755 stop at the Seoni railway station.

Nainpur-Chhindwara and Chhindwara-Nainpur passenger trains also halt at the Seoni railway Station. Seoni is the nearest major railway station for tourists who want to visit Pench National Park.

Currently, Seoni railway station has 3 platforms and 4 electrified railway tracks.

Seoni Railway station has 2 station buildings for entry/exit for public use on both sides of the railway lines, at platform no.1 and platform no.3.

Airways

The nearest airport is Nagpur (130 km); a small airport (air-strip) is available at Seoni near Sukhtara village (17 km away from Seoni ) for landing charter airplanes/helicopters.

== Climate ==
Seoni features a tropical savanna climate (Köppen: Aw)

Climate data for Seoni, Madhya Pradesh (1991–2020, extremes 1901–2012)
Month	Jan	Feb	Mar	Apr	May	Jun	Jul	Aug	Sep	Oct	Nov	Dec	Year
Record high °C (°F)	35.2 (95.4)	37.2 (99.0)	43.2 (109.8)	45.0 (113.0)	45.2 (113.4)	45.0 (113.0)	39.8 (103.6)	36.6 (97.9)	37.4 (99.3)	36.1 (97.0)	35.4 (95.7)	34.2 (93.6)	45.2 (113.4)
Mean daily maximum °C (°F)	26.3 (79.3)	29.7 (85.5)	34.2 (93.6)	38.1 (100.6)	40.4 (104.7)	35.3 (95.5)	29.6 (85.3)	28.5 (83.3)	30.1 (86.2)	31.1 (88.0)	28.8 (83.8)	27.1 (80.8)	31.5 (88.7)
Mean daily minimum °C (°F)	13.7 (56.7)	16.4 (61.5)	21.2 (70.2)	25.8 (78.4)	28.1 (82.6)	26.7 (80.1)	24.2 (75.6)	24.0 (75.2)	23.9 (75.0)	22.0 (71.6)	18.6 (65.5)	15.1 (59.2)	21.3 (70.3)
Record low °C (°F)	2.8 (37.0)	3.3 (37.9)	6.1 (43.0)	11.7 (53.1)	15.0 (59.0)	15.0 (59.0)	14.0 (57.2)	14.0 (57.2)	16.0 (60.8)	10.6 (51.1)	5.0 (41.0)	3.3 (37.9)	2.8 (37.0)
Average rainfall mm (inches)	18.0 (0.71)	23.2 (0.91)	21.3 (0.84)	15.5 (0.61)	18.7 (0.74)	164.5 (6.48)	373.1 (14.69)	273.9 (10.78)	183.2 (7.21)	59.8 (2.35)	22.4 (0.88)	4.0 (0.16)	1,177.7 (46.37)
Average rainy days	1.4	1.4	1.9	1.7	2.0	8.0	16.1	14.0	9.2	3.4	1.2	0.4	60.7
Average relative humidity (%) (at 17:30 IST)	56	50	44	37	33	61	82	84	76	66	59	53	59
Source: India Meteorological Department

== Demographics ==
As of the 2011 Census of India, Seoni had a population of 102,343. Males constitute 50.45% of the population and females 49.55%. Seoni has an average literacy rate of 90.46%, male literacy is 94.71%, and female literacy is 86.03%.

== Education ==
Seoni has more than 100 state-sponsored schools, which are affiliated to the Madhya Pradesh Board of Secondary Education (MPBSE). In addition, there is a Kendriya Vidyalaya in the city, affiliated to the Central Board of Secondary Education (CBSE). The city is also served by numerous other private schools affiliated to either CBSE, ICSE, MPBSE.

Apart from this, there are numerous colleges which provide higher education in the fields of science, commerce, law & arts, including:

- Govt. Post Graduate College, Seoni
- D. P. Chaturvedi College, Seoni
- Govt. Polytechnic College, Seoni
- Govt. Netaji Subhash Chandra Bose Girls College
- A C M College of Education
- Global Law College, Seoni

== Tourist attractions ==
=== Pench Tiger Reserve ===
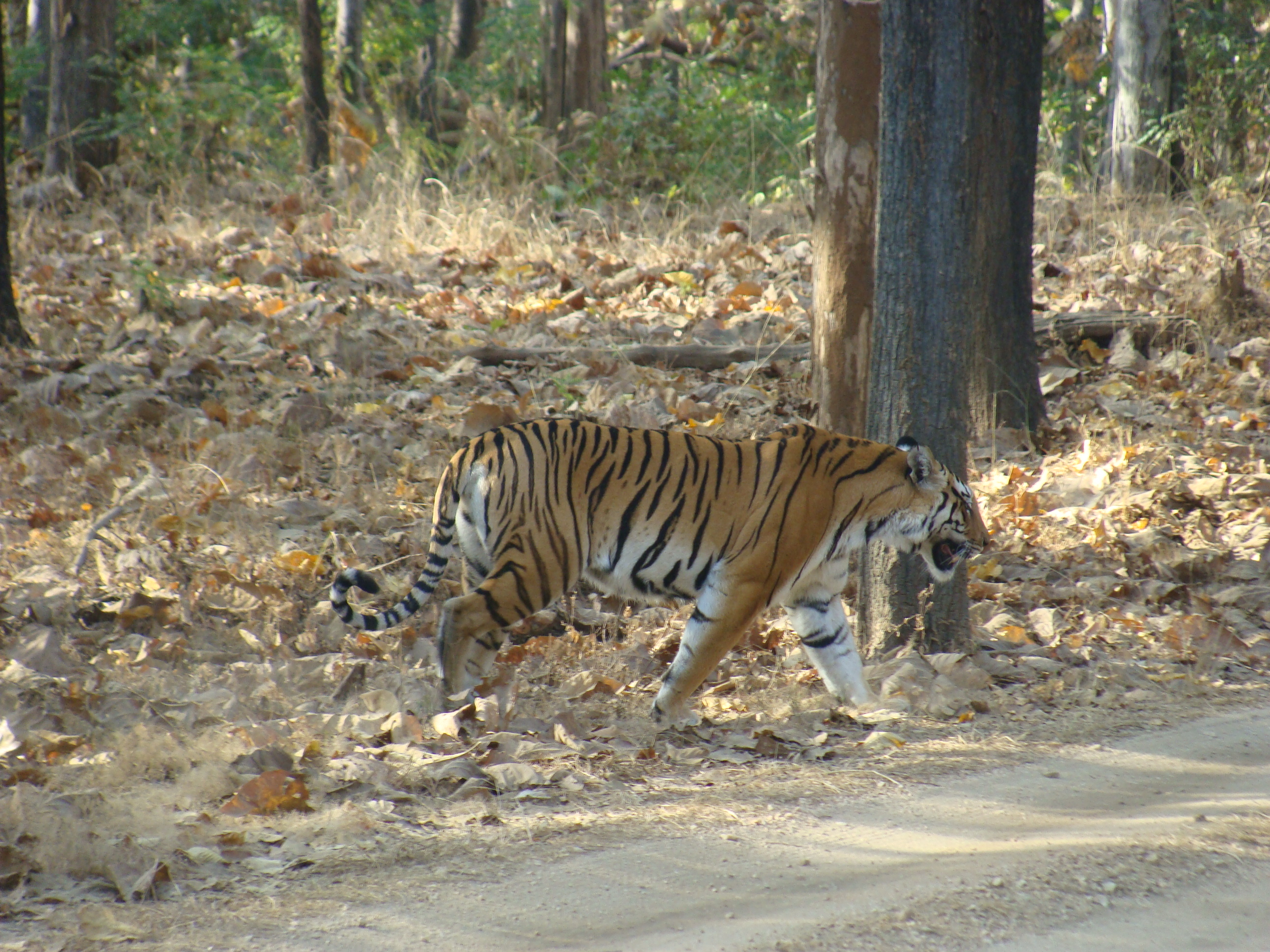
Tiger at Pench National Park

The River Bainganga's source is located beneath the village Mundara, where it includes for example the Pench Tiger Reserve within 10 km. The Pench Tiger Reserve is named after the Pench River, which flows from north to south through the reserve, and is located in the southern reaches of the Satpura hill ranges in the Seoni and Chhindwara districts in the Madhya Pradesh state of India. This area became the 19th tiger reserve of India in 1992. The Pench National Park which constitutes the core of the tiger reserves was notified in the year 1983. The total area of the park is 292.85 km^{2}. The total area of the Pench Tiger Reserve is 757.85 km^{2}.

A forest belt extends in three directions: north, east and south, covering forest tracts of Seoni, Balaghat and Nagpur districts. The contiguous forest on the southern side in the Maharashtra state of India, initially named Pandit Jawaharlal Nehru National Park has been recently included in the Project Tiger network under the same name as this reserve. A dam was constructed on the Pench River on the south-eastern boundary of the reserve.

As the prey concentration is high along the Pench River, tigers usually inhabit this belt. Leopards, though, generally operate in the peripheral areas but are occasionally seen in deep forests also. Jungle cats are commonly seen. Leopard cats, small Indian civet and palm civet are common but seen very rarely.

=== Amodagarh ===
It is supposed that Amodagarh was the work place of Mowgli of author Rudyard Kipling's The Jungle Book. Amodagarh is situated on the Seoni-Mandla state highway. From Amodagarh tourists can see the remains of the palace of Sona Rani. The place has a clef, a hilly nalla with exposed rocks. It lies at a distance of approximately 10 kilometres from Chhui and about 32 kilometres from Seoni.

== Radio Station & Broadcasting Services ==
=== City Radio ===
Radio Seoni | Radioseoni City Radio | website = radioseoni.live, radioseoni.live Radio Seoni Live: A 24x7 online digital radio station featuring local news, regional updates, and 90s-to-now Hindi hits. You can listen directly through the Radio Seoni Live Platform.
