= Sey (surname) =

Sey is a surname. Notable people with the name include:

- Amie Bramme Sey (born 1987) Swedish television and radio presenter of Gambian and Swedish heritage
- Awa Santesson-Sey (born 1997), Swedish singer of Senegalese and Swedish heritage
- Coby Sey, British musician of Akan Ghanaian heritage
- Jacob Wilson Sey, Akan Fante artisan, farmer, philanthropist, nationalist on the Gold Coast (present-day Ghana)
- Jennifer Sey (born 1969), American writer, producer and former gymnast
- Kwesi Sey, British music producer of Akan Ghanaian heritage
- Mary Sey (1952–2024), Gambian judge who currently serves as a Justice of the Supreme Court of the Gambia and was also a Judge of the Supreme Court of Vanuatu
- Omar Sey (born 1941), Gambian politician
- Seinabo Sey, Swedish pop soul singer of Gambian and Swedish heritage

== See also ==
- Seys, a surname
