= Hamari Devrani =

Indian television series

- Genre: Drama
- Written by: Raakesh Paswan; Amitabh Singh; Pawan K Sethhi
- Screenplay by: Mrinal Tripathi; Amitabh Singh; Bhavna Vyas; Pawan K Sethhi
- Directed by: Vikram Ghai; Manish Mistry; Santosh Bhatt; Pawan Sahu; Manchan thakur vikal Vikram Labhe; Swapnil Mahaling; Suraj Rao; Praveen Sudan, Rajesh Sharma
- Creative director: Manish Mistry
- Starring: Manas Shah; Maadhav Deochake; Paresh Bhatt; Krishna Gokani; Uravshi Upadhayay; Vidhi Sindhwad; Shreekant Soni; Alam Khan; Zankhana Sheth]; Sameer Rajda; Sanjay Gagnani
- Opening theme: Parthiv Gohil and Mahalakshmi Iyer
- Country of origin: India
- Original language: Hindi
- No. of seasons: 2
- No. of episodes: 951

Production
- Executive producer: Suprita Purkayastha Reena Manjrekar
- Producer: Shobhana Desai
- Cinematography: Anil Mishra
- Editors: Manish Mistry Jaskaran Singh; Rajnikant Singh; Inderjit Singh; Satyaprakash Singh
- Camera setup: Multi-camera
- Production company: Shobhana Desai Productions

Original release
- Network: StarPlus
- Release: 26 May 2008 – 3 February 2012

Hamari Devrani (transl. Our Sister-in-Law) is an Indian soap opera that was broadcast on StarPlus during weekday afternoons from 2008 to 2012.

== Plot ==
Bhakti (Krishna Gokani) is a poor girl living in a beautiful village in Gujarat near Ahmedabad. Everyone sees her as unlucky because her mother, Gayatri, died while giving birth to Bhakti, and Bhakti's father Hasmukh refused to see her face or recognize her beauty. Bhakti's maternal grandmother, Kashiben, raises her single-handedly and tries to protect her from love to prevent emotional pain. As Bhakti grows up (Jyotica Dholabhai), the show associates her with unluckiness and she becomes lonely. Whenever Bhakti asks about her parents and childhood, Kashiben says that they are in Ahmedabad. Meanwhile, she is presented with an idol of a baby Lord Krishna, and is told that this will protect her in any situation. Bhakti accepts wholeheartedly and calls the baby Laddoo thief. Later, Kashiben takes Bhakti to Ahmedabad where Bhakti's father Hasmukh lives. Hasmukh, and his second wife, insult Bhakti and banish her from Ahmedabad.

Meanwhile, in Ahmedabad, Devkiben, an elderly widowed woman, heads a rich and popular family known as the Nanavatis, with her six sons and five daughters-in-law. The eldest daughters-in-law of the family (Manjula, Parul, Alpa, Jalpa, and Rajeshwari) want Mohan (played by Maadhav Deochake), Devkiben's youngest son, to marry a woman who will demand anything from the family and act like an overlord. Bhakti marries into this family when her would-be elder sisters-in-law (jethanis) see her in Ahmedabad and choose her for their brother-in-law after seeing Bhakti's educated, gullible, and sensitive nature. The story flows onward, where viewers witness how she is treated in this family by her sisters-in-law. Manjula, Parul, Alpa, Jalpa, and Rajeshwari try not to love Mohan and Bhakti, but in the end, good wins over evil, and they indeed start loving Mohan and Bhakti.

The character of Padmini is introduced with her seven-year-old daughter, Shikha, who people believe is Mohan's illegitimate child. Padmini wants to marry Mohan, and obtain the assets of the Nanavati family. She plays many tricks to fulfill her evil intentions. In one scheme, she kidnaps Bhakti (now pregnant) to blackmail and marry Mohan, but she is caught by the police.

The story then moves forward twenty years, and now the story focuses on Mohan and later, Bhakti's daughter, Aastha (played by Vidhi Sindhwad), and Padmini's daughter, Shikha (played by Ekta Saraiya).

This is after Bhakti died from giving birth to a mentally-ill daughter, Aastha, who the Nanavati family adopted. Aastha is raised by all her aunties with love and care and is a sweet and bubbly girl. Meanwhile, Shikha grows up to be ill-mannered like her mother. The show introduces Raj, Shika's love interest. Raj and Shikha love each other but cannot marry because an astrologer predicted Raj's first wife will die. They create a plan so that if Raj marries Aastha, it won't matter if she dies. After the marriage, Aastha shows no sign of death so Raj, with the help of Shikha and his aunt Rasila, plans to murder Astha and 'get-it-over-and-done-with'. Somehow, Aastha miraculously survives, and the five daughters-in-law succeed in taking their revenge from Raj and Rasila.

After that, Mohan marries Vrinda. Even though she is a genuine and loving woman, the Navavati bahus think she is here to steal her money. They eventually realize that Vrinda is a nice woman. Then comes another twist; the family of the Nanavati's only daughter comes to steal money from the Nanavati house. They kidnap Aastha, but Vrinda rescues her and the kidnappers go to jail. The story ends with the Nanavati family celebrating Vrinda's pregnancy.

== Cast ==
- Maadhav Deochake as Mohan Nanavati (season 1) / Paresh Bhatt (season 2)
- Krishna Gokani as Bhakti Mohan Nanavati
- Eva Ahuja as Vrinda Mohan Nanavati
- Vidhi Sindhwad as Aastha Nanavati / Antani
- Shilpa Raizada as Padmini
- Shreekant Soni as Purushottam Das Nanavati
- Zankhana Sheth as Devki Purushottam Nanavati
- Sameer Rajda as Jayant Nanavati
- Urvashi Upadhyay as Manjula Nanavati
- Kaushal Shah as Sannat Nanavati
- Kalyani Thakkar as Parul Sannat Nanavati
- Ajay Parekh as Mukesh Nanavati
- Bhoomi Shukla as Alpa Mukesh Nanavati
- Mihir Rajda as Ketan Nanavati
- Manisha Dave as Jalpa Ketan Nanavati
- Manas Shah as Gautam Nanavati
- Niilam Paanchal as Rajeshwari Gautam Nanavati
- Purbi Joshi as Daksha Deepak Patel
- Nayan Shukla as Ayush Nanavati
- Ekta Saraiya as Shikha Nanavati
- Divya Naaz as young Shikha Nanavati
- Winy Tripathi as Raj / Shekhar Antani
- Falguni Desai as Raseela Antani
- Raunak Soni as Ladoo Gopal
- Lavanya Bhardwaj as Dev Kumar Sanghvi
- Alam Khan as Kunal Nanavati
- Girish Solanki as Sadanand
- Aarti Malkan as Sabarmati

== Production ==
Speaking about the series Producer Shobhana Desi said, "Nothing works as well as a Gujarati family on Indian television and that is the reason why Hamari Devrani is centred around a family living in Gujarat."

In November 2008, the shootings and telecast of all the Hindi television series including this series and films were stalled on 8 November 2008 due to dispute by the technician workers of FWICE (Federation of Western India Cine Employees) for increasing the wages, better work conditions and more breaks between shootings. FWICE first took a strike on 1 October 2008 when they addressed their problems with the producers and production was stalled. A contract was signed after four days discussions and shooting were happening only for two hours content in a day then after which differences increased between them while channels gave them time until 30 October 2008 to sort it out. Failing to do so lead to protests again from 10 November 2008 to 19 November 2008 during which channels blacked out new broadcasts and repeat telecasts were shown from 10 November 2008. On 19 November 2008, the strike was called off after settling the disputes and the production resumed. The new episodes started to telecast from 1 December 2008.

In May 2011, the storyline took a leap while the lead Krishna Gokhani quit when her character was killed and Eva Ahuja, who was cast Bhakti's daughter Aastha became the lead.
