= Dilli Wali Thakur Gurls =

Indian television series

- Genre: Soap opera
- Based on: Those Pricey Thakur Girls by Anuja Chauhan
- Written by: Zaman Habib; S. Manasvi
- Directed by: Rakesh Kumar
- Starring: See below
- Country of origin: India
- Original language: Hindi
- No. of seasons: 1
- No. of episodes: 150

Production
- Production location: Delhi
- Camera setup: Multi-camera
- Running time: Approx. 22 minutes
- Production company: Cinevistaas Limited

Original release
- Network: &TV
- Release: 30 March – 23 October 2015

Dilli Wali Thakur Gurls is an Indian television series based on the 2013 novel Those Pricey Thakur Girls by Anuja Chauhan. It aired from 30 March 2015 to 23 October 2015 on &TV. The show stars Sukirti Kandpal and Aamir Ali. It is set against the backdrop of Delhi and the story revolves around five siblings who are alphabetically named yet very different from each other.

== Plot ==
The story is about the family of Justice LN Thakur, his wife Mamta and their five eccentric daughters: Anji, Binni, Daboo, Chandu, and Eshu. Famous for their shenanigans and popular with the boy brigade, each of the Thakur girls has her unique style, personality and charm.

The story revolves around how the girls manage to woo everyone around them and conquer the world as they see it.

== Cast ==
=== Main cast ===
- Sukirti Kandpal as Debjani "Daboo" Thakur Shekhawat – Mamta and Laxminarayan's third daughter; Anji, Binni, Chandi and Eshu's sister; Dylan's wife
- Aamir Ali as Dylan Singh Shekhawat – Juliet's younger son; Abhimanyu's brother; Daboo's husband
- Monica Sharma as Chandralekha "Chandi" Thakur – Mamta and Laxminarayan's fourth daughter; Anji, Binni, Daboo and Eshu's sister
- Angad Hasija as Rajbeer – Chandi's love interest
- Sara Khan as Anjini "Anji" Thakur – Mamta and Laxminarayan's eldest daughter; Binni, Daboo, Chandi and Eshu's sister; Anant's wife
- Shilpa Raizada as Binodini "Binni" Thakur – Mamta and Laxminarayan's second daughter; Anji, Daboo, Chandi and Eshu's sister; Vicky's wife
- Meera Deosthale as Eshwari "Eshu" Thakur – Mamta and Laxminarayan's youngest daughter; Anji, Binni, Daboo and Chandi's sister

=== Recurring cast ===
- Anang Desai as Justice Laxminarayan Thakur – Mamta's husband; Anji, Binni, Daboo, Chandi and Eshu's father
- Supriya Pilgaonkar as Mamta Laxminarayan Thakur – Justice's wife; Anji, Binni, Daboo, Chandi and Eshu's mother
- Ashu Sharma as Vicky – Aseem's brother; Binni's husband
- Wasim Mushtaq as Aseem – Vicky's brother; Dylan's employee
- Sheela Sharma as Bhu Devi – Thakurs' neighbor
- Simple Kaul as Neha
- Kunickaa Sadanand as Mrs. Juliet Shekhwat – Abhimanyu and Dylan's mother
- Sanjay Gagnani as Abhimanyu Shekhawat – Juliet's elder son; Dylan's brother
- Poonampreet Bhatia as Sunaina
- Abhinav Kapoor as Aman
- Vikram Sahu as Mr. Shekhawat
- Sapna Thakur as Kajal Oberoi
