= Patalkot Express =

Train in India

Patalkot SuperFast Express
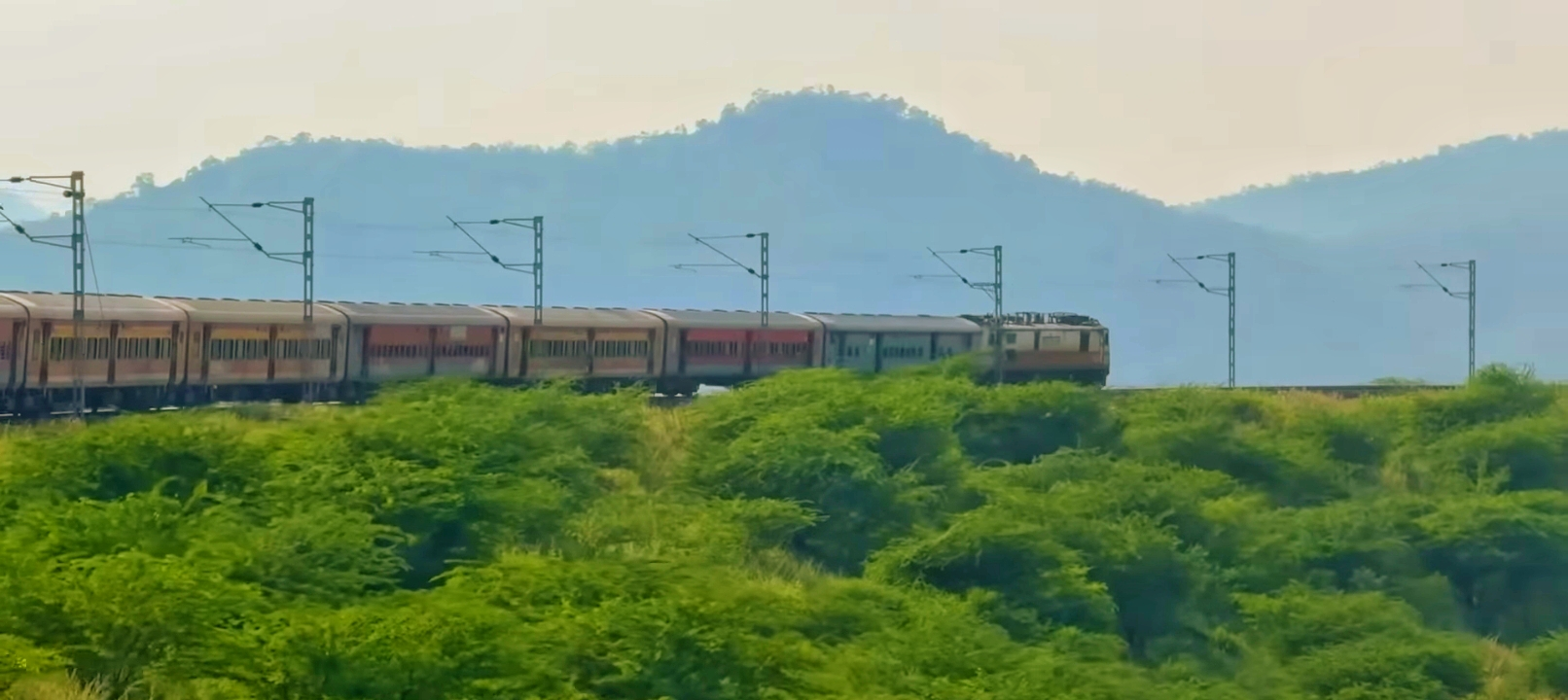
- Patalkot Express At Budhni Ghats of Sehore District of Madhya Pradesh

Overview
- Service type: SuperFast Express
- Locale: Madhya Pradesh, Uttar Pradesh, Delhi, Haryana & Punjab
- Current operator: Northern Railway

Route
- Termini: Seoni (SEY); Firozpur Cantt. (FZR)
- Stops: 40
- Distance travelled: 1,492 km (927 mi)
- Average journey time: 26 hrs 10 min
- Service frequency: Daily
- Train number: 20423 / 20424

On-board services
- Classes: AC 2 Tier, AC 3 Tier, Sleeper Class, General Unreserved
- Seating arrangements: Yes
- Sleeping arrangements: Yes
- Catering facilities: Available
- Observation facilities: Large windows
- Baggage facilities: Available
- Other facilities: Below the seats

Technical
- Rolling stock: LHB coach
- Track gauge: Broad Gauge
- Operating speed: 60 km/h (37 mph) average including halts.

The 20423 / 20424 Patalkot SuperFast Express is an Express train which runs between Seoni railway station in the city of Seoni in Madhya Pradesh and Firozpur the city of Punjab. The name "Patalkot" signifies the nearest tourist spot of Patalkot.

== Arrival and departure ==
Patalkot express (14624/14623)/ Kanahan Valley express 11101/11102 used to run between Chhindwara and Jhansi/Gwalior, extended to Sarai Rohilla (Delhi) with new train numbers (14009, 14010, 14019, 14020) and new timetable.

at present in April 2023, train number 14624 PATALKOT EXP, Firozpur Cantt Jn to Seoni Railway Station runs Daily, has classes 2A 3A SL GN. Pantry is not available. Total travel time of the train is 27 hr, 5 min. Average speed is 55 km/h. 14624 PATALKOT EXP is owned by Northern Railway (NR). Its rake is shared with 14625–14626. 14624 PATALKOT EXP category type is Mail & Express.

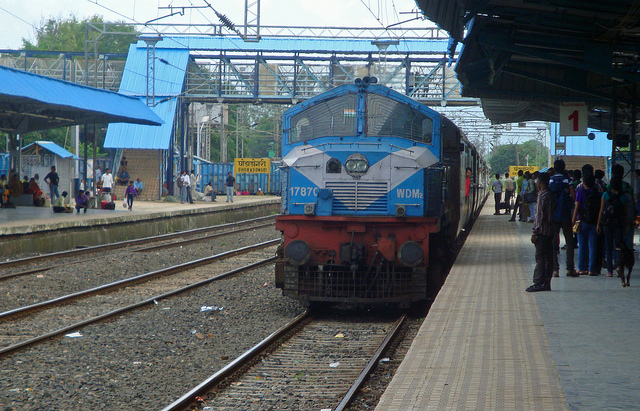
Patalkot Express arriving at Ghoradongri railway station.

== Route and halts ==
The important halts of the train are:

- Seoni
- Chhindwara Junction
- Junnardeo
- Amla Junction
- Betul
- Ghoradongri
- Itarsi Junction
- Narmadapuram
- Rani Kamalapati
- Bhopal Junction
- Vidisha
- Ganj Basoda
- Bina Junction
- Lalitpur Junction
- Jhansi Junction
- Dabra
- Gwalior Junction
- Agra Cantonment
- Mathura Junction
- Safdarjung
- Shakurbasti
- Nangloi
- Rohtak Junction
- Jind Junction
- Jakhal Junction
- Mansa
- Bathinda Junction
- Faridkot
- Firozpur Cantonment

== Coach composition ==
The train consists of 18 coaches of which:

- 1 AC II tier
- 2 AC III tier
- 7 sleeper
- 6 general
- 2 brake cum luggage van

== Average speed and frequency ==
The train runs daily with an average speed of 55-60 km/h.
