= Hanotiya =

- Gram Panchayat
- Location in Madhya Pradesh, India Hanotiya (India)
- Coordinates: 22.1496°N 78.5780°E
- Country: India
- State: Madhya Pradesh
- District: Chhindwara

Government
  - Type: Gram Panchayat
  - Body: Hanotiya Gram Panchayat
  - Sarpanch: Rajkumari Ahake

Population (2011)
  - Total: 1,350

Languages
  - Official: Hindi and English
  - Regional: Hindi and Gondi
- Time zone: UTC+5:30 (IST)
- Postal Code: 480551
- Telephone Code: 07160
- ISO 3166 code: IN-MP
- Vehicle registration: MP-28

Hanotiya is a village and gram panchayat of Chhindwara district in the Indian state of Madhya Pradesh, India. It is located at 48 km in west from district headquarter and 6 km in south from Junnardeo city headquarter.

== Educational Institutions ==
- Government Higher Secondary School Hanotiya, Junnardeo

== Demographics ==
According to the 2011 census Hanotiya village has a population of 1350.

== Geography ==
Hanotiya is located at 22.1496°N 78.5780°E.

== Attractions ==
- Hanotiya Madai Mela
- Rainidhaam (7days fair)
- Takia River

== See also ==
- Chhindwara district
- Junnardeo
