= Junnardeo railway station =

Railway station in Chhindwara, Madhya Pradesh, India

Junnardeo जुन्‍नारदेव

General information
- Other names: Junnor Deo and Jamai
- Location: Junnardeo, Madhya Pradesh; India
- Coordinates: 22°12′N 78°35′E
- Elevation: 748 metres (2,454 ft)
- System: Indian Railways station
- Owner: Indian Railways
- Line: Amla–Chhindwara section
- Platforms: 3
- Tracks: Above 6

Construction
- Structure type: At ground
- Parking: Available
- Cycle facilities: Available

Other information
- Status: Functional
- Station code: JNO
- Zone(s): Central Railway
- Division(s): Nagpur (CR)

History
- Opened: 1936

Passengers
- Approx. 5 thousand daily

Services
Preceding station	Indian Railways	Following station
Hirdagarh towards ?	Central Railway zone Amla–Chhindwara line	Palachourai towards ?
Location
- Location within Madhya Pradesh

Junnardeo railway station serves Junnardeo in the Indian state of Madhya Pradesh.

== History ==
Junnardeo Railway Station (JNO) has a long railway history dating back to 1936. It is situated on the Chhindwara–Amla route and is presently under the Nagpur Central Railway (CR) Division. The station is historically associated with the Satpura Railway network and has played an important role in connecting the region with the wider railway network.

Recently, under the Amrit Bharat Station Scheme, Junnardeo Railway Station has been upgraded with modern passenger amenities. The redevelopment includes a new booking office-cum-waiting hall and a 12-metre-wide foot overbridge equipped with lifts and ramps, along with improved passenger facilities. These upgrades are part of the Government of India’s efforts to modernise railway stations and provide passengers with a more comfortable and convenient travel experience.

== Services ==
Trains departing from the Junnardeo railway station are:

- Panchvalley Express
- Patalkot Express
- Chhindwara-Amla Memu
- Chhindwara-Betul Passenger
