= Lavanya Bhardwaj =

Indian television actor and model

- Born: 12 November 1984 (age 41)
- Occupations: Actor; Model
- Years active: 2008-now
- Spouse: Dede Frescilla (m. 2016)
- Children: 2

Lavanya Bhardwaj (born 12 November 1984) is an Indian television actor and model. He is best known for his role as Sahadeva in the TV show Mahabharat.

== Personal life ==
Bhardwaj met Dede Frescilla, during the shoot of a show in Indonesia. They married on 5 February 2016. They have two daughters: Dakshita (born 14 October 2016) and Pratishta (born 25 May 2018).

Personal Challenges & Career Break (2017–2019)

2017 Family Health Crisis: Career put on hold/hiatus to care for his family after his mother was diagnosed with breast cancer.

2019 Loss & Severe Injury: Faced the passing of his father, followed by a severe accident resulting in a severe slip disc in the lower back (L1, L4, L5) that nearly caused full paralysis, requiring intensive physical rehabilitation before aiming for a full comeback to acting.

== Filmography ==
Television

- Hamari Devrani (2008) as Dev Kumar Sanghvi
- Kahaani Hamaaray Mahaabhaarat Ki (2008) as Young Sahadeva
- Mahabharat Starplus (2013-2014) as Sahadeva
- Devon Ke Dev... Mahadev (2011) – Played Nahusha
- Kamdev Connection as Kamdev (2026)
- Indonesian TV Shows & Reality Shows The New Eat Bulaga! Indonesia (2014–2015) – Presenter / Host Bolly Masuk Desa – Reality show participant – Indonesian drama series Periku (2015) – FTV Telefilm Periku (2015, ANTV FTV) – Played male lead alongside Kimberly Ryder and Sandy Ishabella Senandung (2016, MNCTV) – Played Evan alongside with Siti Badriah and Hengky Kurniawan
