= Sanjay Gandhi Thermal Power Station =

Thermal power plant in Madhya Pradesh, India

- Location of Sanjay Gandhi Thermal Power Station
- Country: India
- Location: Birsinghpur, Umaria (district), Madhya Pradesh (state).
- Coordinates: 23°18′21″N 81°03′54″E
- Status: Operational
- Commission date: 1993
- Operator: MPPGCL

Thermal power station
- Primary fuel: Coal

Power generation
- Units operational: 5
- Nameplate capacity: 1340.00 MW

Sanjay Gandhi Thermal Power Plant is located at Birsinghpur in Umaria district of Madhya Pradesh, India. The power plant is one of the Coal-fired power station of MPPGCL

== Power plant ==
Sanjay Gandhi Thermal Power Station has an installed capacity of 1340.00 MW. The First unit was commissioned in March 1993. The Water for the plant has been procured from nearby Johila Dam which is spread across 1810 Hectares. The coal for the plant has been procured by Rail from South eastern Coal Fields.

== Installed capacity ==
| Stage | Unit Number | Installed Capacity (MW) | Date of Commissioning | Status | TG set Provider | Boiler Provider |
|---|---|---|---|---|---|---|
| First | 1 | 210 | 26 March 1993 | Operational | BHEL | ABL |
| First | 2 | 210 | 27 March 1994 | Operational | BHEL | ABL |
| Second | 3 | 210 | 28 February 1999 | Operational | BHEL | ABL |
| Second | 4 | 210 | 23 November 1999 | Operational | BHEL | ABL |
| Third | 5 | 500 | 18 June 2007 | Operational | BHEL | BHEL |

== Commercial Monitoring Cell ==
Sanjay Gandhi Thermal Power Station has a Commercial Monitoring Cell which commercially monitors the Profit as well as the Losses of the Power Plant. In order to Automate the work and to compete in the Real Time World with the Deviation Settlement Mechanism of India incorporated by CERC an In-House Commercial Monitoring Software has been developed which shows the Profit/Loss in Real-Time .

== Deviation Settlement Mechanism ==
The Commercial Monitoring Software is designed with respect to the Rules & Regulations of Deviation Settlement Mechanism formed by CERC and a DSM Calculator (Open Access) for offline DSM Calculation (Block-Wise) is also provided at http://dsm.mppgcl.org/calculator

== Average Grid Frequency ==
Sanjay Gandhi Thermal Power Station is the first power station to provide Moving Average Frequency of running block (Open Access) which is required for calculation of deviation charges of that block at http://dsm.mppgcl.org/freq

== See also ==
- Satpura Thermal Power Station
- Amarkantak Thermal Power Station
- Shree Singaji Thermal Power Station
