= Ghoradongri =

Town in Madhya Pradesh, India

- Town
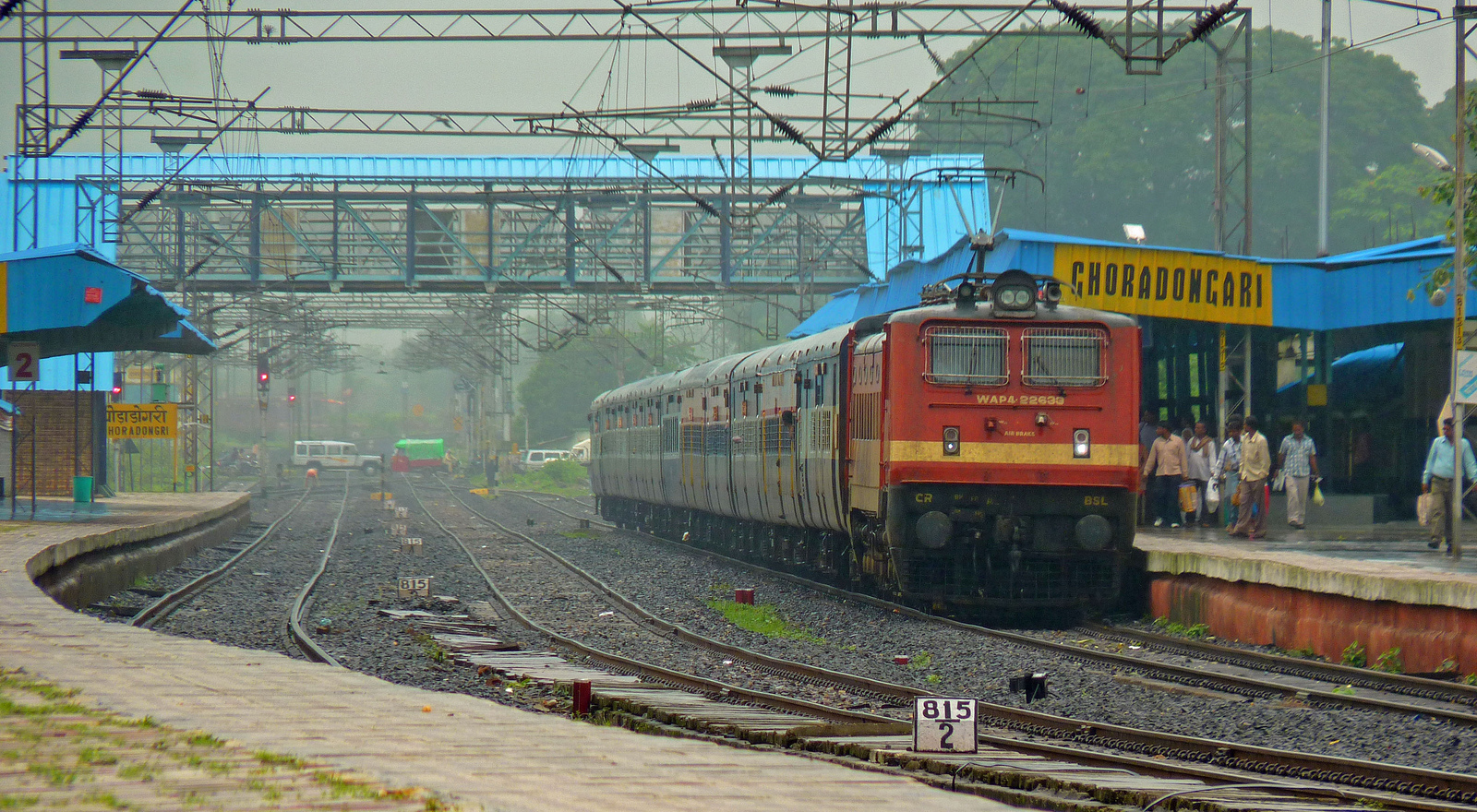
- Railway Station In Ghoradongri

- Location in Madhya Pradesh, India Ghoradongri (India)
- Coordinates: 22°7′22″N 78°0′9″E
- Country: India
- State: Madhya Pradesh
- District: Betul District

Population
  - Total: 13,000

Languages
  - Official: Hindi
- Time zone: UTC+5:30 (IST)
- PIN: 460443
- Telephone code: 07146
- Vehicle registration: MP 48-

Ghoradhongri is a town and a Nagar Parishad in Betul District of Madhya Pradesh, India. Its also a Tehsil Headquarter and Assembly constituency.

== Geography ==
Ghoradongri is located at 22.12°N 77.99°E It has an average elevation of 508 metres (1,669 feet). Its located in Satpura Ranges and Tawa and Machana Rivers flow near town.

== History ==
Ghoradongari started as a railway station on the main railway line joining New Delhi with Madras (now Chennai). It was a large trading post for the teak wood extracted from the nearby forests and shipped via rail to all parts of northern half of India.

== Demographics ==
The Ghoda Dongri Town has population of 9,745 of which 4,887 are males while 4,858 are females as per Census India 2011.

Ghoda Dongri has total administration over 2,037 houses to which it supplies basic amenities like water and sewerage. It is also authorize to build roads within limits and impose taxes on properties coming under its jurisdiction.

== Government ==
Ghoradongri Assembly constituency is one of the 230 Vidhan Sabha (Legislative Assembly) constituencies of Madhya Pradesh state in central India. Ghoradingri comes under Betul (Lok Sabha constituency). It is a reserved seat for the Scheduled tribes (ST).

== Economy ==
Its people depend on farming and business. Wheat, maize and soybeans are the main crops.

== Transportation ==
This town is connected with Sarni, Betul, Itarsi via road.

Ghoradongri Railway Station is give service for the town and Sarni.
