= Sey Chassler =

American magazine editor and writer

Sey Chassler (1919–1997) was an American magazine editor and writer best known as the longtime editor-in-chief of Redbook. He led the magazine for 16 years until his retirement in 1981, during which its circulation grew from 2 million to 5 million. Chassler served as a president of the American Society of Magazine Editors and was inducted into its Hall of Fame in 1997. He was a founding member of the Child Care Action Campaign.

Chassler also worked on Coronet, Collier's and This Week. After retiring from Redbook in 1981, he continued to write and teach, and served as a consulting editor to Parade.

== Advocacy ==
In 1976, Chassler organized a coordinated campaign in which articles explaining the proposed Equal Rights Amendment appeared in the July issues of 34 women's magazines. President Jimmy Carter appointed Chassler to the National Advisory Committee for Women in June 1978. He later resigned from the committee in protest after the dismissal of co-chair Bella Abzug.

== Selected works ==
- Aspects of the Present (preface; with Margaret Mead and Rhoda Metraux, 1980)
