= Madhya Pradesh Power Generation Company Limited =

Indian government electricity company

Madhya Pradesh Power Generating Company Limited
- Type: Government-owned Corporation-PSU
- Industry: Electricity generation
- Founded: The Company was incorporated on 22.11.2001 & started functioning independently from 01-06-2005
- Headquarters: Jabalpur, Madhya Pradesh, India
- Area served: State of Madhya Pradesh, India
- Key people: Shri Manish Singh (chairman); Shri Manjeet Singh (managing director)
- Services: Electricity Generation
- Owner: Government of Madhya Pradesh (100%)
- Number of employees: 4878
- Website: www.mppgcl.mp.gov.in

M.P. Power Generating Company Limited (MPPGCL) is the electricity generation company of the Government of Madhya Pradesh state in India.

== Generation capacity ==
The installed capacity of MPPGCL as on 01.01.2019 is 6315 MW out of which madhya pradesh share is about 6312.50 MW.

PLF (%) Last 10 Years
Years	ATPS	STPS	SGTPS	SSTPP	Overall
2009-10	45.89%	64.57%	65.99%	N.A.	62.86%
2010-11	48.66%	60.51%	65.78%	N.A.	61.10%
2011-12	54.66%	53.68%	70.20%	N.A.	61.38%
2012-13	71.66%	55.26%	73.52%	N.A.	66.24%
2013-14	74.3%	48.0%	67.8%	N.A.	60.0%
2014-15	53.3%	52.9%	58.1%	26.23%	49.6%
2015-16	96.8%	47.2%	59.9%	40.4%	51.2%
2016-17	80.51%	31.28%	58.53%	23.54%	40.49%
2017-18	93.94%	43.09%	64.26%	35.90%	50.55%
2018-19	88.9%	64.1%	74.0%	61.1%	67.3%

== Power stations ==
=== Thermal power stations coal based ===
Sr.No	Project	Capacity (in M.W.)	Unit MW	Status	EPC Contractor (TG set and Boiler make)
1	Satpura Thermal Power Station	500	2x250 MW	Construction of proposed 1x660 MW unit is yet to start	BHEL
2	Amarkantak Thermal Power Station	210	1×210 MW	All Unit Functional ,1x660 MW under surveying	BHEL
3	Sanjay Gandhi Thermal Power Station	1340	4×210 MW,1×500 MW	All Unit Functional	BHEL (though ABL make boiler in 210MW units)
4	Shree Singaji Thermal Power Station	2520	2x600 MW, 2×660 MW (super critical)	All Unit Functional.	BHEL -600MW, L&T-MHPS-660MW

Total installed thermal capacity 5400 MW.

=== Hydel power stations ===
Sr.No	Power Station	Installed Capacity	M.P.Share	Location / River
1	Gandhi Sagar (5x23 MW)	115	57.5	Distt. Mandsour / Chambal River
2	Pench, Totladoh (2x80 MW)	160	107	Distt. Nagpur / Pench River
3	Rani Awanti Bai Bargi (2x45 MW)	90	90	Bargi, Distt. Jabalpur / Narmada River
4	Rajghat (3x15 MW)	45	22.5	Rajghat, Distt. Ashoknagar / Betwar River
5	Birsinghpur (1x20 MW)	20	20	Birsingpur, Distt. Umariya / Johila River
6	Ban Sagar I Tons (3x105 MW)	315	315	Sirmour, Distt. Rewa Beehar River
7	Ban Sagar II Silpara (2x15 MW)	30	30	Silpara, Distt. Rewa / Cana
8	Bansagar -III Deolond (3x20 MW)	60	60	Deolond, Distt. Shahdol / Sone River
9	Bansagar -IV Jhinna (2x10 MW)	20	20	Jhinna, Distt. Satna / Jhinna Dyke
10	Madhikheda (3x20 MW)	60	60	Madhikheda, Distt. Shivpuri / Kalisindh River
	Total	1186	917.5	

Two proposed Hydel unit at Chhindwara (2x45MW) and Murena (270 MW)
