= Seoni railway station =

Railway station in Seoni district, Madhya Pradesh, India

Seoni

General information
- Location: Seoni, Seoni district, Madhya Pradesh; India
- Coordinates: 22°05′13″N 79°32′37″E
- Elevation: 614.739 metres (2,016.86 ft)
- System: Indian Railways
- Owner: Indian Railways
- Line: Nainpur –Chhindwara line
- Platforms: 3
- Tracks: 4

Construction
- Structure type: At ground
- Parking: Available
- Cycle facilities: Available

Other information
- Status: Functional
- Station code: SEY
- Zone(s): South East Central Railway
- Division(s): Nagpur SEC

History
- Opened: 1904
- Rebuilt: 2023
- Former names: Bengal Nagpur Railway

Passengers
- Approx. 5 thousand daily
Location
- Location within Madhya Pradesh Location within India

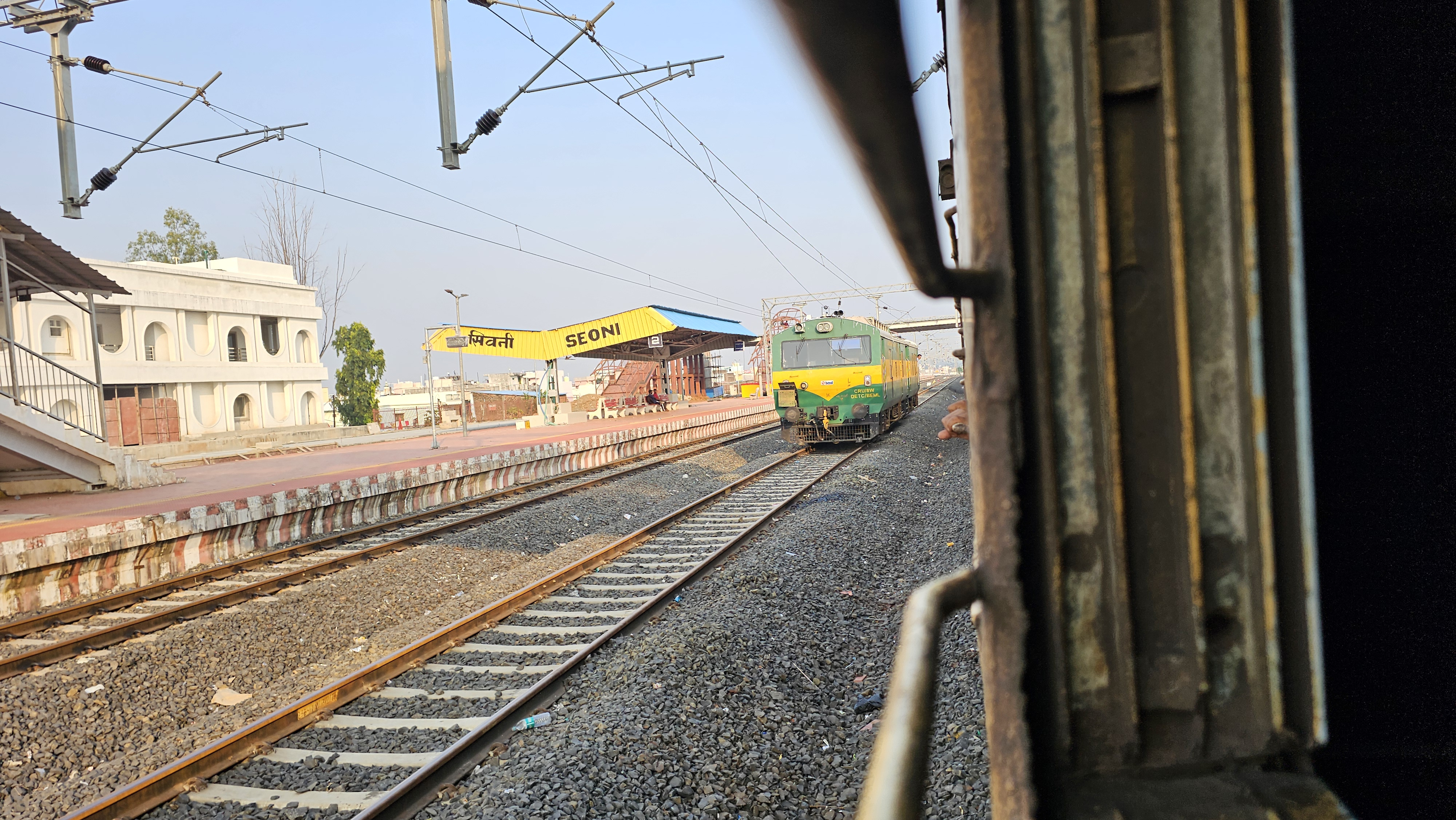
Seoni railway 2

Seoni Railway station (code: SEY) is situated in Seoni city, on the Chhindwara - Seoni - Nainpur section of South East Central Railway (earlier called Bengal Nagpur Railway or BNR) of Indian Railways, in Seoni district of the Indian state of Madhya Pradesh.

== Overview ==
On 24 April 2023, inauguration of the first broad-gauge passenger train ( Chhindwara - Nainpur Passenger ) by Indian Prime Minister Narendra Modi provided electrified broad-gauge connectivity to Seoni.

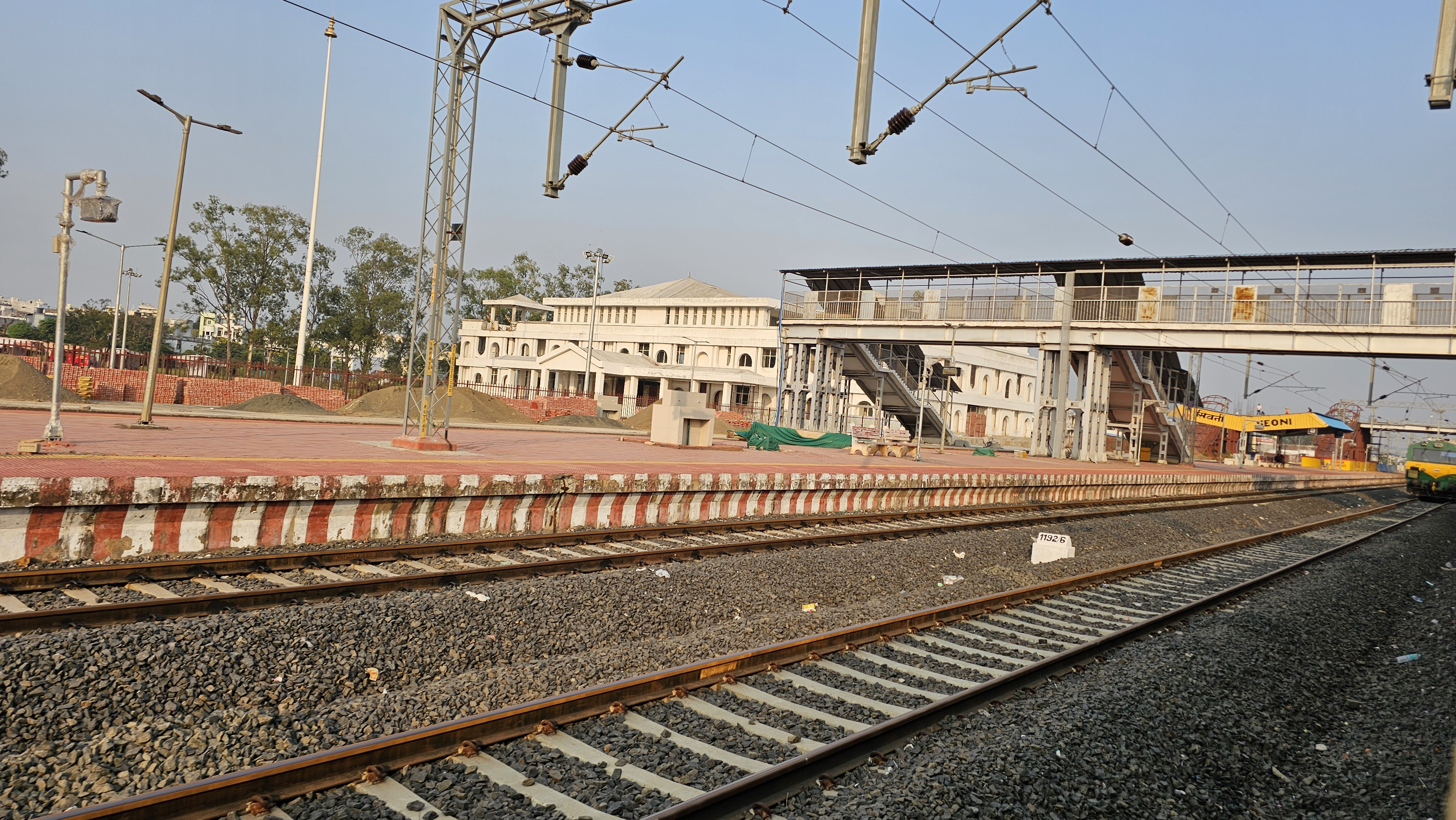
Seoni railway station platform

== Trains Originating from Seoni ==
Train number	Train name	Origin	Destination	Days
14623	Patalkot Express	Seoni	Firozpur	Daily
09590	Seoni - Betul special fare passenger	Seoni	Betul	Daily

== Trains Terminating at Seoni ==
Train number	Train name	Origin	Destination	Days
14624	Patalkot Express	Firozpur	Seoni	Daily
19343	Panchvalley Passenger	Indore	Seoni	Daily

== Trains halting stoppage in Seoni ==
Train number	Train name	Origin	Destination	Days
11201	Nagpur - Shahdol Express	Nagpur	Shahdol	Daily
11202	Shahdol - Nagpur Express	Shahdol	Nagpur	Daily
11756	Rewa - Itwari Express	Rewa	Itwari(Nagpur)	Tue, Thu, Fri, Sun
11755	Itwari - Rewa Express	Itwari (Nagpur)	Rewa	Mon, Wed, Fri, Sat
58849	Chhindwara Nainpur Passenger	Chhindwara	Nainpur	Daily
58850	Nainpur Chhindwara Passenger	Nainpur	Chhindwara	Daily
58855	Chhindwara Nainpur Passenger	Chhindwara	Nainpur	Daily
58856	Nainpur Chhindwara Passenger	Nainpur	Chhindwara	Daily

Seoni Railway station has 2 station buildings on both sides of railway lines, at platform number 1 and platform number 3.
