= Satpura Thermal Power Station =

Power plant in Madhya Pradesh, India

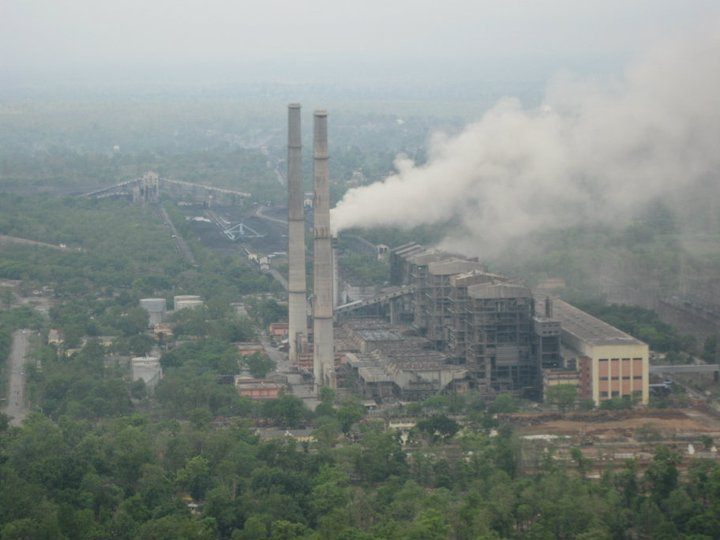
- Location of Satpura Thermal Power Station
- Country: India
- Location: Sarni, Betul, Madhya Pradesh
- Coordinates: 22°6′40″N 78°10′24″E
- Status: Operational
- Commission date: 1967
- Operator: MPPGCL

Thermal power station
- Primary fuel: Coal
- Tertiary fuel: FURNACE OIL/HSD

Power generation
- Units operational: 6
- Nameplate capacity: 1330 MW

Satpura Thermal Power Station is located at Sarni in Betul district of Madhya Pradesh, India. The power plant is one of the Coal-fired power stations of MPPGCL.

== Power plant ==
Satpura Thermal Power Station has eleven Units, five has been decommissioned and dismantled, four are non-operational while the rest two are operational. The Water for the plant is procured from nearby Satpura Dam Reservoir, which spread in 2,893 acres (11.71 km^{2}). The Dam was built for the purpose of power generation.

== Installed capacity ==
Satpura Thermal Power Station was the largest power plant of Madhya Pradesh till 2007 with an installed capacity of 1142.5 Megawatt. From year 2019 onwards it is the third largest power plant of MPPGCL in Madhya Pradesh. From year 2014 onwards with the commissioning of 2 units of 250 MW each and decommissioning of 5 units of 62.5 MW each, the installed capacity of Satpura Thermal Power Station is 1330 MW.

In 2007 with the commissioning of a 500 MW unit at Sanjay Gandhi Thermal Power Station the Satpura Thermal Power Station turned second largest power plant with the largest being Sanjay Gandhi Thermal Power Station which has an installed capacity of 1340 MW.

In year 2018 a unit of 660 MW capacity was commissioned at Shree Singaji Thermal Power Project, it raised the installed capacity from 1200 MW to 1860 MW making it the largest power station of MPPGCL. In 2019 a unit of 660 MW was commissioned, it further raised the installed capacity to 2520 MW.

Stage	Unit Number	Installed Capacity (MW)	Date of Commissioning	Status	TG set Provider	Boiler Provider
First	1	62.5	1967 October	Decommissioned	GE, USA	The Babcock & Wilcox Company (B&W), USA
First	2	62.5	1968 March	Decommissioned 2013 December	GE, USA	The Babcock & Wilcox Company (B&W), USA
First	3	62.5	1968 May	Decommissioned 2012 October	GE, USA	The Babcock & Wilcox Company (B&W), USA
First	4	62.5	1968 July	Decommissioned 2013 December	GE, USA	The Babcock & Wilcox Company (B&W), USA
First	5	62.5	1970 April	Decommissioned 2013 February	GE, USA	The Babcock & Wilcox Company (B&W), USA
Second	6	200	1979 July	Non-operational	BHEL, India	BHEL, India
Second	7	210	1980 September	Non-operational	BHEL, India	BHEL, India
Third	8	210	1983 January	Non-operational	BHEL, India	BHEL, India
Third	9	210	1984 February	Non-operational	BHEL, India	BHEL, India
Fourth	10	250	2013 August	Operational	BHEL, India	BHEL, India
Fourth	11	250	2014 March	Operational	BHEL, India	BHEL, India

== See also ==
- Sanjay Gandhi Thermal Power Station
- Amarkantak Thermal Power Station
- Shree Singaji Thermal Power Project
- Madhya Pradesh Power Generation Company Limited
