= Seys =

Seys is a surname. Notable people with the surname include:

- Corneel Seys (1912–1944), Belgian soccer player
- Dylan Seys (born 1996), Belgian football player
- Evan Seys (1604–1685), Welsh-born British lawyer and member of parliament
- John Seys (1799-1872), American reverend, missionary, and diplomat
- Roger Seys (died 1599), Welsh lawyer and politician
