= Ghoradongri railway station =

Railway station in Madhya Pradesh

Ghoradongri
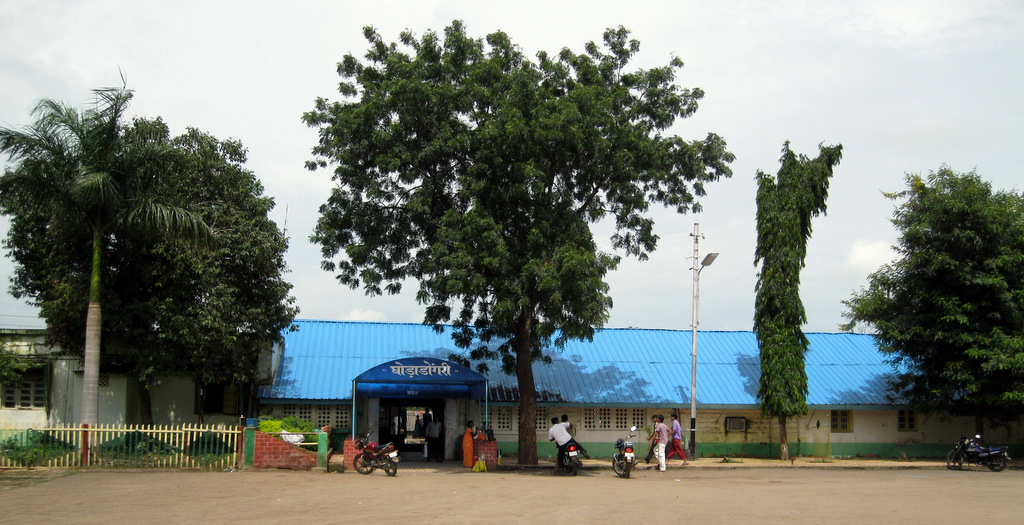

General information
- Location: Ghoradongri, Betul district, Madhya Pradesh; India
- Coordinates: 22°07′33″N 78°00′08″E
- Elevation: 407 metres (1,335 ft)
- System: Indian Railways station
- Owner: Indian Railways
- Operator: Central Railway
- Line: Bhopal–Nagpur section
- Platforms: 3
- Tracks: 3

Construction
- Structure type: Standard (on ground)
- Parking: Yes

Other information
- Status: Functioning
- Station code: GDYA
- Zone(s): Central Railway
- Division(s): Nagpur CR
Location
- Location within India Location within Madhya Pradesh

Ghoradongri railway station is a railway station in Ghoradongri town of Madhya Pradesh. Its code is GDYA. It serves Ghoradongri town. The station consists of three platforms. Passenger, Express and Superfast trains halt here.

== Major trains ==
Many trains Halt in Ghodadongri -

- Andaman Express
- Gondwana Express
- Deekshabhoomi Express
- Patna Express
- Patalkot Express
- Panchwelly Express
- Amla Itarsi Memu
- Sanghmitra Express
- Gorakhpur–Yesvantpur Express
- Grand Trunk Express

== Gallery ==
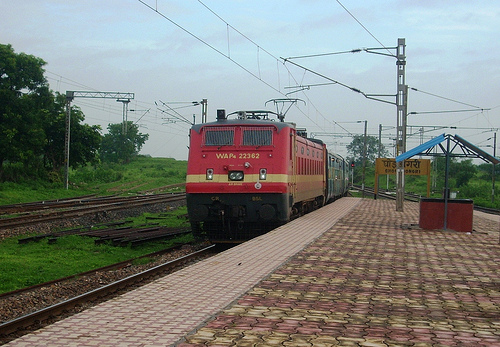
Gondwana Express arriving at Ghoradongri railway station.

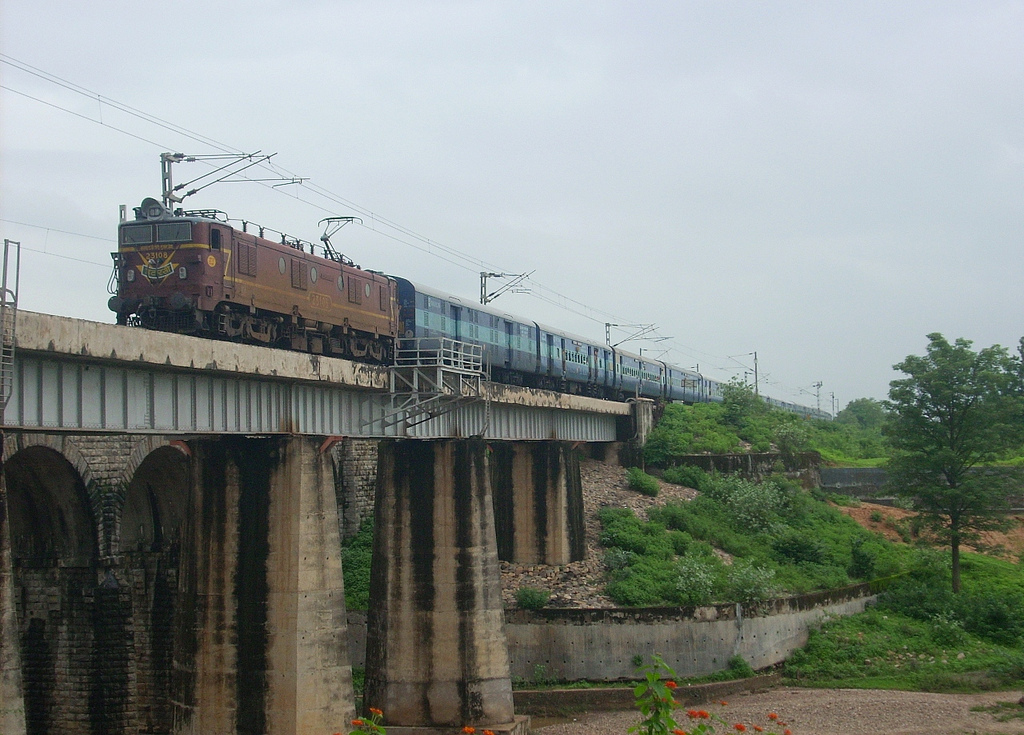
Manikarnika Express near Ghoradongri.

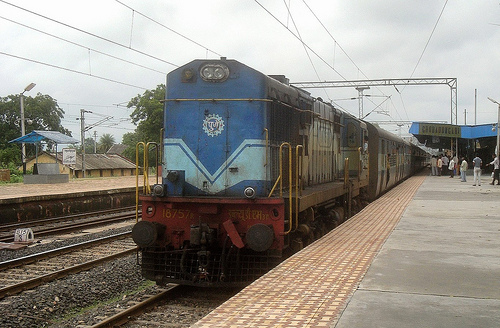
Deekshabhoomi Express at Ghoradongri railway station.

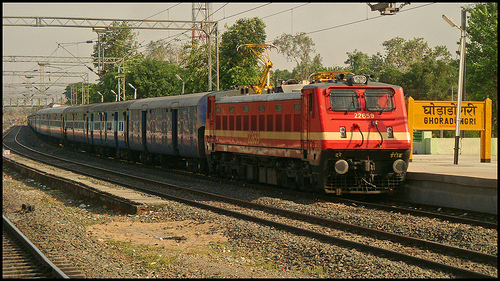
Andaman Express at Ghoradongri railway station.
