= Shree Singaji Thermal Power Project =

Power station in Madhya Pradesh, India

Shree Singaji Super Thermal Power Project (Mundi Power Plant)
- Location of Shree Singaji Super Thermal Power Project
- Country: India
- Location: Dongalia, Mundi Khandwa District, Madhya Pradesh
- Coordinates: 22°6′10″N 76°32′10″E
- Status: Operational
- Commission date: Phase 1: February 2014; Phase 2: March 2019
- Owner: Madhya Pradesh Power Generation Company Limited (MPPGCL)
- Operator: Madhya Pradesh Power Generating Company Limited (MPPGCL)

Thermal power station
- Primary fuel: Coal

Power generation
- Units operational: 2 X 600 MW; 2 X 660 MW
- Nameplate capacity: 2520 MW

Shree Singaji Super Thermal Power Project is a coal-fired power plant of MPPGCL located near Dongaliya village near by Mundi of Khandwa District in Madhya Pradesh state of India. This project is owned by MPPGCL (Madhya Pradesh Power Generating company limited). The water required is taken from Indira Sagar Reservoir on Narmada River. Coal linkage is achieved with South Eastern Coalfields Limited.

== Installed capacity ==
The Project was originally envisaged to be constructed in three development phases, but only two of the three phases have been approved for construction.

The first phase consists of 2 units with a generation capacity of 600 MW each. First unit was commissioned in February 2014 and, as of June 2014, the second unit is expected to complete in October 2014.

The second phase consists of 2 units with generation capacity of 660 MW each. These units would be super critical thermal plants. As of December 2014, construction of phase two had not yet started.

Stage	Unit Number	Installed Capacity (MW)	Date of Commissioning	Status
First	1	600	2014, February	Running
First	2	600	2014, December	Running
Second	3	660	2018, November	Running
Second	4	660	2019, March	Running
