= Narsingpur Assembly constituency =

Constituency of the Madhya Pradesh legislative assembly in India

Coordinates: 22.95°N 79.19°E

Narsingpur
- Constituency No. 119 for the Madhya Pradesh Legislative Assembly

Constituency details
- Country: India
- Region: Central India
- State: Madhya Pradesh
- District: Narsinghpur
- Lok Sabha constituency: Narmadapuram
- Established: 1952
- Reservation: None

Member of Legislative Assembly
- 16th Madhya Pradesh Legislative Assembly
- Incumbent Prahlad Patel
- Party: Bharatiya Janata Party
- Elected year: 2023
- Preceded by: Jalam Singh Patel

Narsinghpur is one of the 230 Madhya Pradesh Legislative Assembly constituencies of Madhya Pradesh state, in central India.

== Overview ==
It comprises Kareli Tehsil, and parts of Narsinghpur tehsil, both in Narsinghpur district. As of 2023, its representative is Prahlad Patel of the Bharatiya Janata Party.

== Members of the Legislative Assembly ==
Election	Name	Party
1952	Sarla Devi	Indian National Congress
1957	Sarla Devi	Indian National Congress
1962	Mahendra Singh Kiledar	Praja Socialist Party
1967	Mahendra Singh Kiledar	Indian National Congress
1972	Shyam Sunder Narayan Mushran	Indian National Congress
1977	Surendra Kumar Dhorelia	Janata Party
1980	Shyam Sunder Narayan Mushran	Indian National Congress (Indira)
1985	Shashi Bushan Singh	Indian National Congress
1990	Uttam Chand Lunawat	Bharatiya Janata Party
1993	Lt.Col. Ajay Narayan Mushran	Indian National Congress
1998	Lt.Col. Ajay Narayan Mushran	Indian National Congress
2003	Jalam Singh Patel	Bharatiya Janata Party
2008	Sunil Jaiswal	Indian National Congress
2013	Jalam Singh Patel	Bharatiya Janata Party
2018	Jalam Singh Patel	Bharatiya Janata Party
2023	Prahlad Singh Patel	Bharatiya Janata Party

== Election results ==
=== 2023 ===
2023 Madhya Pradesh Legislative Assembly election: Narsinghpur
Party	Candidate	Votes	%	±%
BJP	Prahlad Singh Patel	110,226	56.33	+5.4
INC	Lakhan Singh Patel	78,916	40.33	−1.96
NOTA	None of the above	2,283	1.17	−0.74
Majority		31,310	16.0	+7.36
Turnout		195,667	84.29	+2.72
BJP hold		Swing		

=== 2018 ===
2018 Madhya Pradesh Legislative Assembly election: Narsinghpur
Party	Candidate	Votes	%	±%
BJP	Jalam Singh Patel	87,837	50.93	
INC	Lakhan Singh Patel	72,934	42.29	
NISHAD	Amar Noriya Patrkar	2,154	1.25	
NOTA	None of the above	3,293	1.91	
Majority		14,903	8.64	
Turnout		172,477	81.57	
BJP hold		Swing		

== See also ==
- List of constituencies of the Madhya Pradesh Legislative Assembly
- Narsinghpur district
