= Bagaspur =

Town in Madhya Pradesh, India

- Town
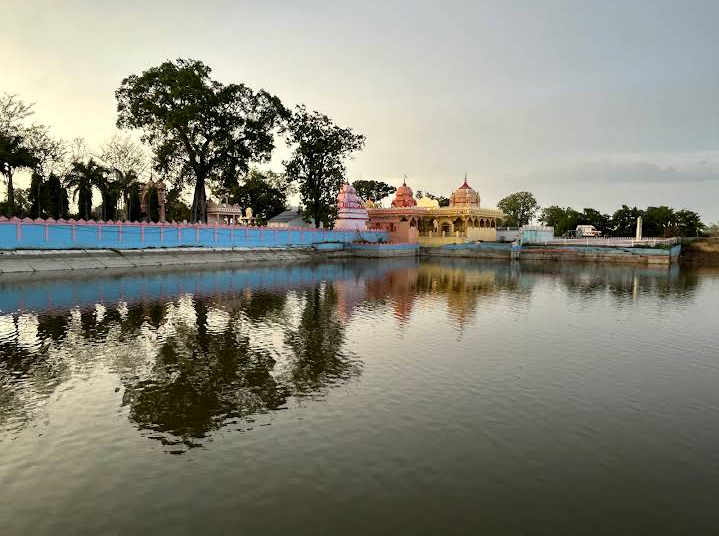
- Nirvikar Path jain Mandir

- Location in Madhya Pradesh, India
- Coordinates: 22.99°N 79.50°E
- Country: India
- State: Madhya Pradesh
- Division: Jabalpur Division
- District: Narsinghpur District

Bagaspur is a town and a gram panchayat in Narsinghpur District of Madhya Pradesh, India. Its Pin Code is 487118.

== Geography ==
Bagaspur is located on 22.99°N 79.50°E. It has an average elevation of 347 metres (1,138 ft). It is situated in the fertile plains of the Narmada River valley in Madhya Pradesh. The region is predominantly agrarian.

== Population ==
In 2011, Bagaspur had a population of 7,129, of which 3,807 were male and 3,322 were female.

Bagaspur had 915 children aged 0–6, which was 12.83% of the population.

== Transport ==
Bagaspur is 42 km (26 mi) away from Narsinghpur and 6 km (3.7 mi) away from Gotegaon. It is well connected with major roads.

Nearby railway station is Shridham railway station. Passenger, MEMU, Express and Superfast trains halt here.
