= Jalam Singh Patel =

Indian politician

Member of Legislative Assembly, Madhya Pradesh
- In office (2003-2008), (2013-2018), (2018 – 2023)
- Succeeded by: Prahlad Singh Patel
- Constituency: Narsinghpur

Personal details
- Born: 10 March 1964 (age 62) Gotegaon, Narsinghpur district, Madhya Pradesh, India
- Party: Bharatiya Janata Party
- Education: B.Sc

Jalam Singh Patel (born 10 March 1964) is an Indian politician of the Bhartiya Janata Party. He has been Member of Madhya Pradesh Legislative Assembly from Narsinghpur constituency since 2013.
