= Karakbel =

- Town
- Location in Madhya Pradesh, India
- Coordinates: 22.99029°N 79.32440°E
- Country: India
- State: Madhya Pradesh
- District: Narsinghpur

Government
  - Type: Local government
  - Body: Nagar parishad

Area
  - Total: 3.22 km^{2} (1.24 sq mi)
- Elevation: 397 m (1,302 ft)

Population (2011)
  - Total: 4,563
  - Density: 1,420/km^{2} (3,670/sq mi)

Languages
  - Official: Hindi
- Time zone: UTC+5:30 (IST)
- Telephone code: 07791
- Vehicle registration: 49

Karkbel is a Census Town and a Nagar Parishad in Narshingpur in the state of Madhya Pradesh, India.

== Geography ==
Karkbel is located at 22.99029°N 79.32440°E. It has an average elevation of 397 metres (1,265 feet). Karakbel is located at about 329 km from Bhopal, the capital of the state, and 17 km from Narshingpur.

== Demographics ==
Karakbel has a population of 5,679 in census of 2011. The male constitutes 62% population and female constitutes 38% of population.17% of population is under 6 years.
