= Narsinghpur =

- City
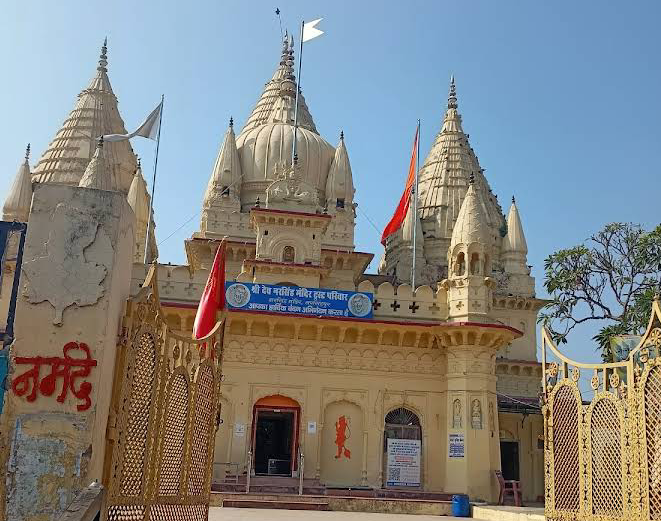
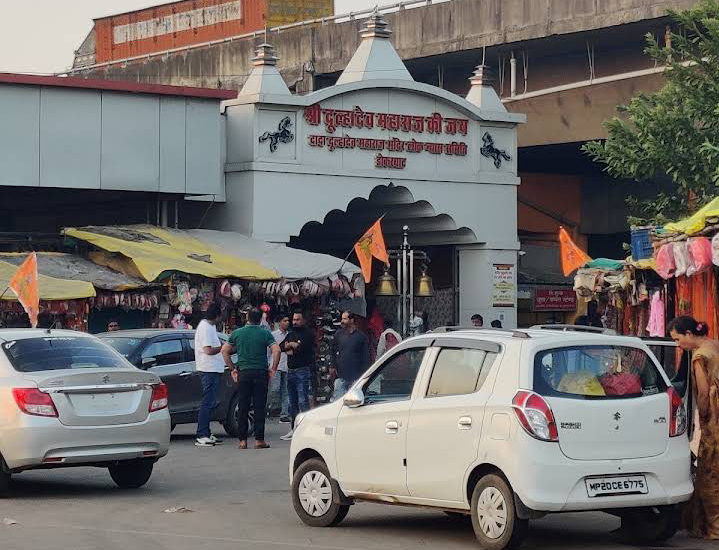
- Narsingh Bhagwan Mandir, Dulhadev Maharaj

- Damrughati (Shiv temple) at Gadarwara
- Coordinates: 22.948°N 79.195°E
- india: India
- State: Madhya Pradesh
- District: Narsinghpur
- Named for: Narsingh temple

Government
  - District Magistrate: Riju Bafna, IAS
- Elevation: 347 m (1,138 ft)

Population (2021)
  - Total: 105,000
  - Rank: 15
- Demonym: Narsinghpuriya

Languages
  - Official: Hindi
- Time zone: UTC+5:30 (IST)
- Postal code: 487001
- Vehicle registration: MP-49
- Website: narsinghpur.nic.in

Narsinghpur is a city in Madhya Pradesh in central India. It is a district under Jabalpur division. Narsinghpur has a large temple dedicated to Lord Narasimha. As of 2001, Narsinghpur is the most literate district of the state.

== History ==
=== Prehistory ===
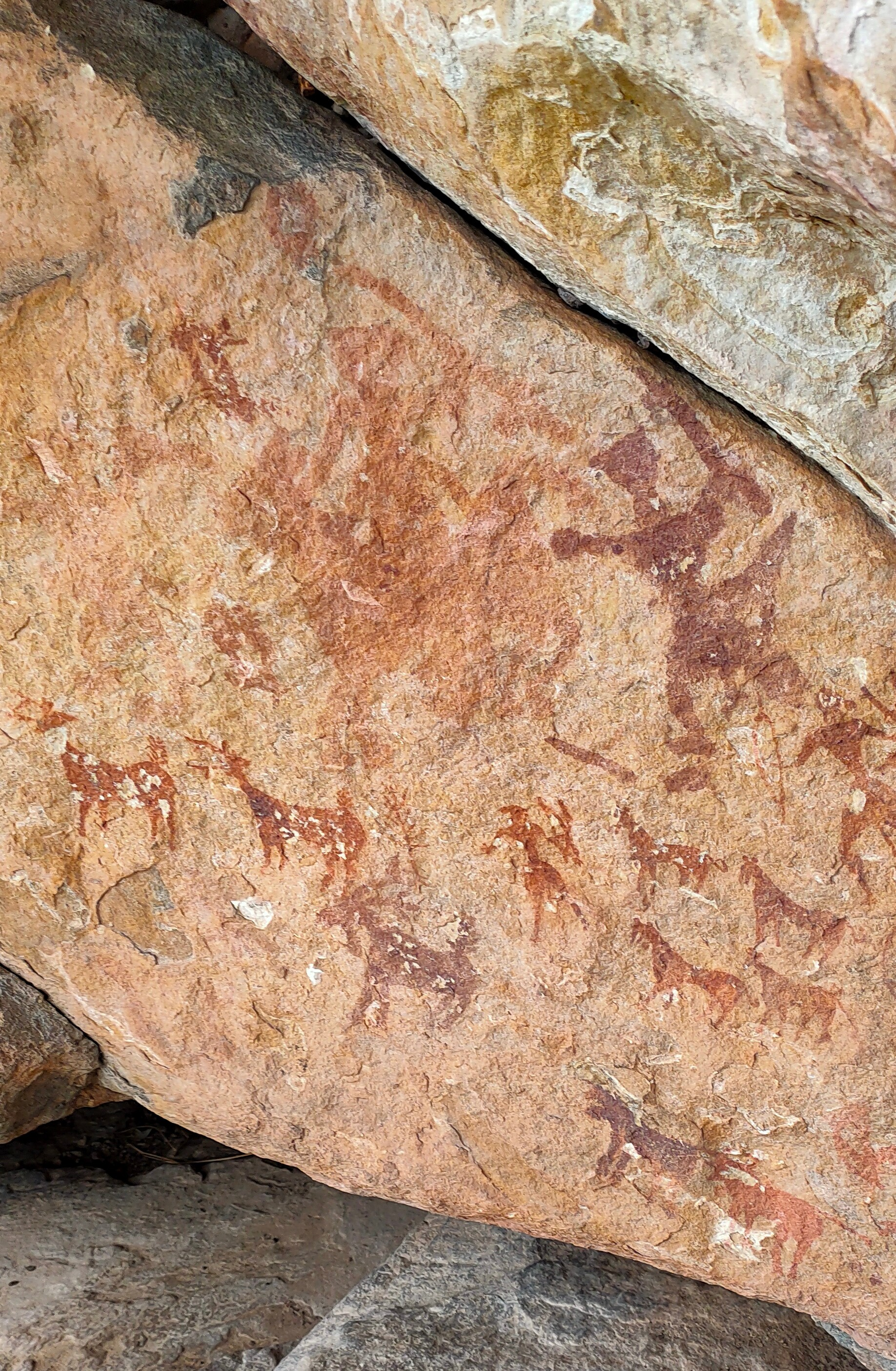
Rock Paintings Depicting Hunting of Animals

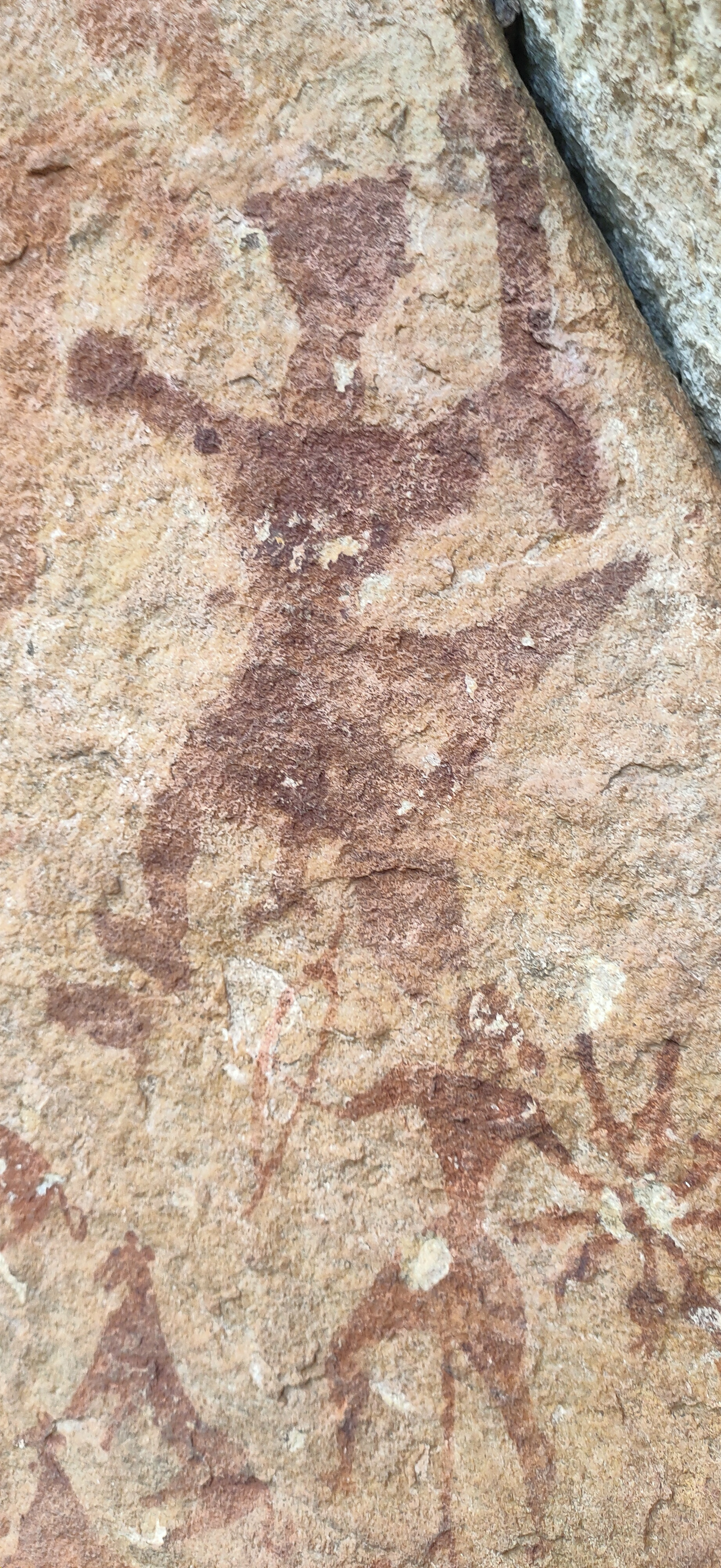
Human with sword. This hints that the paintings are from the Iron Age

The earliest signs of human life in Narsinghpur were found recently in the caves of Vinaiki village (Narsinghpur) which lies on the banks of Shakkar river (tributary of Narmada), in the hinterlands of Kareli Forest Zone (a part of Satpura reserve) in Narsinghpur. Most of the villagers are Gonds and they knew about the paintings for a long time. Locals call the rock paintings found in their village by the name 'Putra Putariya' (पुतरा पुतरिया).The actual age of the rock paintings is not yet determined. Analysis by the Department of Archaeology is awaited.

The axe, bow and arrows, and swords can be seen in the pictures. The rock paintings depict humans riding and playing with horses and elephants. Humans are also seen hunting animals like deer. Sheep, Wild boar, Buffaloes, and Barahsingha can also be seen. One of the rock paintings is of humans with armed axes and a peculiar headgear. Some of the paintings are of a clear red color similar to those found in Bhimbetika, while some are gray. Pictures have also been described in some script which is yet to be identified. It is within the radius of 150 kilometers from the Bhimbetka rockshelters of Raisen and about 100 km away from Adamgadh hills.

=== The Satavahana period ===
This area was a part of the Satavahana Empire from the 2nd to the 4th centuries CE, after which, it was annexed into the Gupta Empire during the reign of the Emperor Samudragupta. There is some historical evidence for Padi rule. There is no record of this area until the 9th century CE, when the Kalachuri kingdom was established. The Kalchuri capital was near the Narmada river, later established at Tripuri.

Among the followers of Sangram Shah, Dalpati Shah ruled for a period of 7 years peacefully. After, this Queen Durgawati took the reign and gave a proof of courage or bravery, and ruled for a period of 16 years (1540–1564). In 1564, the Queen died, while fighting bravely, giving a tough fight to Asaf Khan, the Sepoy Salar of King Akbar. In Narsinghpur district, at the castle fort of Chauragarh, Asaf Khan trapped prince Veer Narayan and killed him with his cunning tactics. Thus Garha Katanga came under control of Mugals in 1564, Gonds Mugals. After then the area was under control of various officers and administrative or hereditary chiefs during the Maratha's rule. The boundaries of the area continued to change according to the powers and influence of their people. Chawarpatha, Barha, Saikheda, Gadarwara, Shahpur, Singhpur, Shrinagar, and Tendukheda were headquarters of various parganas

In 18 century the ruler of Narsinghpur Thakur ji was killed by British rulers and the fort of narsinghpur was totally destroyed. There are a number of sites of interest to archaeologists in the area, as the area has been inhabited since the second century AD, according to historical documents from that time. Narsinghpur has a number of sacred sites, including a nearby cave associated with Adi Guru Shankracharya's place of meditations and studies. The Gonds also called Parakarti Pujak

=== Bhonsle Rulers ===
In 1785, Madhavji Bhonsle purchased the area of Mandla and Narmada Ghati in 27 lakhs. The area was under pressure of army rule during the reign of Raghuji Bhonsle, Nawab of Bhopal and Pindari. Due to unsuitability of the ruler and other problems, the common people were extremely exploited. This period was also known as a period of problems and instability. However, after the defeat of Bhosles in Battle of Sitabuldi in 1817, British rule came into existence in the area.

=== British period ===
After the Battle of Sitabuldi, this area came under the control of British rule in 1817, which was confirmed by an alliance in 1826. In this period the area was known as Gadarwara pargana, with Chichli and Gangai. The Gond Jagirs were under Marathas, where as Sindhiya had given Barha and Paloha Jagirs to Pindari Sardars, Chitu Khan and Karim Khan. In 1818, the British army captured the fort of Chauragarh, and in 1830 the control of this area was given to a committee. During British rule, the administration of this district improved, and in 1836 the area was partitioned and was merged in Hoshangabad district. But after Bundela revolt in 1843, this part was once again reinstated in this district.

=== Struggle for independence ===
Despite strong British rule, the desire for independence was prevalent among the common people. In 1825, Chawarpatha and Tendukheda were given to the British Government. In 1857 the police station of Chawarpatha and Tendukheda were captured by revolutionaries under the leadership of Gond Chief Delan Shah of Madanpur. With this, the struggle for independence was started. But in 1858, Delan Shah was caught and hanged to death. Thus in the year British curbed the struggle for independence, and they succeeded in establishing their rule. After 1899, Shayam Bihari Nagaria had a big hand in Independence Of Narsinghpur. Unfortunately, he died in December 2007.

=== Congress movement ===
After the establishment of Indian National Congress in 1885, even in this district, the feeling for Independence was prevalent. Strong efforts were made by the people here, being motivated by the efforts and leadership of Lokmanya Tilak, Subhas Chandra Bose, Mahatma Gandhi, and Pandit Jawahar Lal Nehru. Among the leaders of his district were Gayadutt, Manik Lal Kochar, Choudhary Shankar Lal and Nitiraj Singh(were imprisoned in Sewani jail), Rudrapratap Singh(martyred by British) Gopal Das Kathal, Thakur Niranjan Singh, ( Mushran family donated to British War fund)who led the people of this district towards the Independence movements. In order to break the unity and enthusiasm of the people, the British had once again partitioned the district and merged it with Hoshangabad district. However, even then, enthusiasm as well as the fight for independence continued in the people's minds. During the mass demonstration of satyagrah at Chichli in 1932, Mansharam and Gauradevi lost their lives during police firing. One more incident transpired with one stouthearted liberation fighter, Ramkumar Badal, from village Bamhani, who was customarily involved in multiple protests was caught and charged under different sections after licit efforts, he went out and made a minuscule group of people in a town denominated Barman to protest against enforcement made by Britishers, which influenced multiple people near the town, and then the protest gained more reach and accolade, which made it more vigorous enough to win an aside, and so the executive officer appointed in that block was coerced to transmute the rules. This was a great triumph that influenced and incentivized people far away to fight for freedom.

Thousands of revolutionaries faced the atrocities of British rule and gave an example of strong devotion for the country, and snipe against the British rule. When the country gained Independence in 1947, on 15 August, a new era started in this district. After 9 years of independence, when states were reorganized on the basis of languages, Narsinghpur, once again, became a district. Since 1 November 1956, Narsinghpur district has been moving towards progress and prosperity in its full existence.

== Geography ==
Narsinghpur district is situated in the central part of Madhya Pradesh. Madhya Pradesh is located in the central part of India. Narsinghpur district holds a special importance being located in the country. It attracts special attention because of its natural situation as well. On the northern ends Vindhyachal and on the southern ends throughout the lengths, are Satpura ranges of mountains. In the northern part, river Narmada flows from east to west. It is a sacred river. Narsinghpur district has received many natural gifts as Narmada Kachhar. In the ancient period, this area was ruled by many Rajvansh, including the great historical warrior Rani Durgawati, who was known by various names in that period. In the 18th century, Jat Sardars had constructed a large temple, in which an idol of Lord Narsimha was placed and worshiped. So, in the name of Lord Narsimha the village was renamed. Gadariya Kheda become "Narsinghpur" and later on it became headquarters of the district.

Narsinghpur is located at 22.95°N 79.2°E. It has an average elevation of 347 metres (1,138 ft).

== Agriculture ==
Narsinghpur district is well known for its fertile land. The black soil is suited for any kind of cultivation and there are adequate irrigation facilities. The district is famous for its rich agricultural production. It is situated in the upper part of Narmada Valley, which is of much important for agriculture. The district's production of grains is more than the local requirement. For agriculture both old and new techniques are equally in practice. For old equipment, there are ploughs, bullock carts, bakhar, hansiya, and various types of knives and khurpi. In new methods or techniques, there are: thrashers, tractors, harvesters, electric pumps and sprinklers. Along with these better quality seeds and the best quality pesticides are used.

=== Crops ===
Mainly crops are cultivated in two seasons, Rabi and Kharif. This is based on the climate and the conditions prevails in the district by the time.

During Rabi, crops are cultivated in October–November, with cutting in April/May. The major Rabi crops are wheat, pulses, peas, alsi and masoor.

During Kharif, the farming period is June–July with cutting in October. The major Kharif crops are: paddy, jowar, bajra, makka, kondo and kutki.

The District's major commercial crops are soybeans and sugarcane, which is produced in large quantity and a major source of income. Narsinghpur is the largest producer of soybeans in the Madhya Pradesh. Soybean is used for oil extraction, and sugarcane for sugar and gur. Narsinghpur alone contributes about 80% of sugarcane production of MP.

Apparently Kareli (tehsil) is biggest gud mandi of India. Sugar industry has seen a significant progress in the last decade.

=== Soil and irrigation ===
The district has rich black soil which is very fertile and heavy and useful for farming. Black Domat soil, smooth soil, rocky soil, and sandy soils are there in which wheat, grams and all type of pulses have been produced. The Kalmetahar area of the district is one of the most fertile lands of Asia. Here wheat and gulabi grams are the major crops which are produced in large quantity. Gadarwara is very famous for tuwar (Arhar) pulses mainly. At the district level, agricultural farms, soil experiment laboratories are there, where farmers get pesticides, best quality seeds, fertilizers and most important technical guidance.

Major sources for irrigation are wells, ponds, rivers, canals and tubewells. Irrigation has mainly been done by tube-wells.

== Forest resources ==
In the district, 26.55% of the area is covered by the forests which are a mixture of herbs, sherbs and scurbs. In the hilly area of Satpura and Vindhyachal, there are trees of teak, saal, bamboo and saj. In the plains, there are mahuwa, mangoes, khairi, achar, karonda, harr and baheda.

Teak forests are very dense and found all over the district. Dry wood from the forests is used in many domestic purposes and used for building construction and furniture making. In the district, tobacco leaf collection is done on a large scale. The season for tobacco collection is May–June. From tobacco leaves usually bidies were made. In rural areas private contractors do the mahuwa collection which is used for preparing local wine.

From the forests, they harvest amala, chironji, harr, baheda, gum and herbs which are used for medicinal purposes. The district has plenty of mango trees and has ample production. In the deep forests, there are tigers, bears, monkeys, rabbits, pigs, deer, foxes, nilgai and panther.

== Minerals ==
In the district, soap stone, dolomite, fireclay, and limestone are found. Apart from this, building construction stone is also found near the village Gontitoriya. Fireclay is found mainly in Kanharpani, Bachai, Heengpani and Hiranpur hills. From various hilly areas there are murram, crushed stones, and from rivers, sand which is used for construction purposes. Cement is manufactured from limestone, and cement pipes are prepared from cement. In the village Chichali, utensils are prepared from a metal called "peetal", a combination of copper and zinc. Chichali is very famous for these items.

== Industry ==
Being an agricultural land, large industries are rare in the area. Also most of the industrial institutions are agricultural-oriented. Industries include agricultural equipment, iron items, and Tendukheda and Dangidhana are well known for these industries.

Gur/sugar from sugarcane: In many places, gur has been prepared from sugarcane all over the district. Kareli is very famous for Gur Mandi. In Narsinghpur, Kareli, Tendukheda and Gadarwara there are sugar mills.

Beedi industry work is mainly done in Narsinghpur, Gadarwara, Shridham.

Daal Mills: Tuwar (arhar) pulses are prepared mainly at Narsinghpur and Gadarwara.

Oil Mills: There are many oilmills in the district where soya bean, groundnut and tilli oil are extracted. That's located in Gadarwara, Kareli and Narsinghpur.

Other industries include cement pipes, paper mills, plastic and rubber, leather goods, earthen utensils and pots. Poultry farms, goat farming, and fish farming.

Gotitoriya is now producing coal. This open cast mine is owned by BLA industries.

Central Government has set up a project of National Importance in Gadarwara. Ntpc Gadarwara is established.

There is a demand of An Engineering, A law College and a Medical College in Narsinghpur City for the development of the city.

== Demographics ==
As of the 2001 India census, Narsimhapur had a population of 46,120. Males constituted 52% of the population and females 48%. Narsimhapur has had an average literacy rate of 77%, higher than the national average of 59.5%: male literacy is 82%, and female literacy is 72%. In Narsimhapur, 12% of the population is under 6 years of age. Bundelkhandi is prominent language along with Hindi.

== Climate ==
Narsinghpur has a humid subtropical climate (Köppen climate classification Cwa) bordering tropical savanna climate (Aw). The climate is generally pleasant except in summer. Waves move slowly except during the south-west monsoon. The district's usual minimum temperature rests around 25–26 degrees Celsius (77–79 °F), and the maximum temperature rises up to 45–46 °C (113–115 °F). May is the hottest month of the year. It is very excessively hot during summer, and in the end of this season dust storms come. When the monsoon arrives, the hygrometer mercury goes very low. The district's 90% rainfall is observed during monsoon months only; i.e., June to September. The average rainfall is of 60 days per year, and measures approximately 40 inches (1,016 mm). During December–January it is cold, and the average temperature during day time is around 9 °C (48 °F) and 3.2 °C (38 °F) at night. Sometimes cold waves also occur, and heavy fog is also observed.

Climate data for Narsinghpur (1991–2020, extremes 1962–2012)
Month	Jan	Feb	Mar	Apr	May	Jun	Jul	Aug	Sep	Oct	Nov	Dec	Year
Record high °C (°F)	34.6 (94.3)	37.8 (100.0)	42.8 (109.0)	47.4 (117.3)	48.0 (118.4)	47.4 (117.3)	42.4 (108.3)	38.2 (100.8)	38.8 (101.8)	40.0 (104.0)	37.6 (99.7)	33.2 (91.8)	48.0 (118.4)
Mean daily maximum °C (°F)	26.3 (79.3)	29.8 (85.6)	35.2 (95.4)	39.7 (103.5)	42.6 (108.7)	38.4 (101.1)	32.1 (89.8)	29.7 (85.5)	31.6 (88.9)	33.1 (91.6)	30.3 (86.5)	27.8 (82.0)	32.8 (91.0)
Mean daily minimum °C (°F)	9.4 (48.9)	11.8 (53.2)	16.1 (61.0)	21.0 (69.8)	26.0 (78.8)	25.6 (78.1)	23.8 (74.8)	22.9 (73.2)	22.6 (72.7)	19.4 (66.9)	14.1 (57.4)	9.0 (48.2)	18.2 (64.8)
Record low °C (°F)	1.2 (34.2)	1.4 (34.5)	6.0 (42.8)	10.0 (50.0)	17.0 (62.6)	16.0 (60.8)	14.0 (57.2)	16.0 (60.8)	15.0 (59.0)	9.6 (49.3)	2.2 (36.0)	−1.4 (29.5)	−1.4 (29.5)
Average rainfall mm (inches)	19.4 (0.76)	12.9 (0.51)	18.6 (0.73)	8.2 (0.32)	13.9 (0.55)	128.5 (5.06)	335.6 (13.21)	318.7 (12.55)	151.0 (5.94)	28.2 (1.11)	13.4 (0.53)	9.6 (0.38)	1,057.9 (41.65)
Average rainy days	1.3	0.9	0.6	0.8	1.4	7.1	12.7	13.2	7.0	1.8	1.0	0.3	48.1
Average relative humidity (%) (at 17:30 IST)	47	39	32	25	27	47	71	79	71	54	49	46	49
Source: India Meteorological Department

== Tourism ==
Narsimha Mandir

During the 18th century this temple was constructed by Jat Sardars and plane statue of Lord Narsimha, as a human avatar of Lord Vishnu having a lion's head. This is situated at District H.Q. This temple got its importance as the district's nomenclature hails from here only. There is a lake behind the Temple. But that lake is not clean, Government is working on it. Few years later from now it will be a Tourism point.

Bramhan Ghat

Bramhan Ghat, also known as Barman, is situated at mani Sagar N.H. 26 & 24, and 12 kilometres (7 mi) away from Kareli railway station, and the bank of river Narmada. Lord Brahma's Yagya shala, Rani Durgawati temple, Elephant gate and Varahas statue are places of tourist interest there. The Narmada River flows in seven strains. It flows on the occasions of Makar Sankranti to Basant Panchami. Mela has been arranged in which District Administration also takes part. Also organized are different stalls of the district Govt. Depot. This exhibition has the display of the Agriculture Depot, co-operative, education, and health. Different beneficial schemes information and achievement have shown throes which people get benefit out of this exhibition, and also avail the district out of 20% on different sale items.

Jhoteshwar (Paramhanshi ganga Ashram)

On the route of Mumbai - Hawrah Central railway track 15 km (9 mi) from Sridham railway station on the central railway track of Mumbai - Hawrah. There is a temple of golden Raj- Rajeshwari tripur sundari.

There are Jhoteshwar temple, Lodheshwar temple, Hanuman tekari, rock, Shivling made up of slohutic. It is a place when Jagatguru Shankaracharya Joytesh & Dwarkadish pithadheshwar Saraswati Maharaj meditate and worship. On the Basant Panchami occasion, there are 7 days of Mela organized.

Damaru Ghati

Damaru Ghati is situated 5 km (3 mi) from Gadarwara railway. The station is on the central railway's Itarsi–Jabalpur track. One huge Shivling is there, which found one small Shivling inside it.

Fort of Chauragharh

The fort of Chauragharh (Chaugan) is situated on the peak of Satpuda mountain called Chauragarh near Chaugan village in Gadarwara tehsil of Narsinghpur district. It is located at 20.35 latitude 79.55 longitude. This fort built at a distance of about 35 kilometers from the Gadarwara tehsil headquarters is east-facing. These types of rocks are made by connecting thick limestone with small and big boulders.

National Festival Mela is organised in Manegaon which is situated 25 km (16 mi) from District H.Q. on Narsinghpur road, every year from Republic day onwards. It is a one-week fate in which state-level tournaments of Kabdadi, volleyball, Kho-Kho, Dos ball are organized. It includes folksongs, and Choupad also, which is organized at District level.

Tone Ghat Is Near Barehta Village (22 km from Narsinghpur railway station at Jabalpur road) And also known for little Bhedaghat. Another place which has historical connection with pandavas situaded near village Barehta Noniya village about 2 km far away from Gram Sabha.

== List of Pin Codes Narsinghpur ==
01. 487771 - Salichauka

02. 487441 - Sihora (Narsinghpur)

03. 487770 - Chichli

04. 487221 - Kareli

05. 487001 - Narsinghpur

06. 487330 - Barman

07.487118 - Gotegaon

08. 487225 - Amgaon Bada

09. 487661 - Sainkheda (Narsinghpur)

10. 487555 - Kaudia

11. 487881 - Sali Choka Road

12. 487110 - Singhpur (Narsinghpur)

13. 487337 - Sagoni Tendukheda

14. 487551 - Jawaharganj Gadarwara

15. 487114 - Karakbel

16. 487334 - Dobhi
