= Kosamkheda =

Kosamkheda (कोसमखेड़ा)
- Village
- Location Madhya Pradesh Narsinghpur, India
- Coordinates: 22.866053°N 79.152031°E
- Country: India
- State: Madhya Pradesh
- Division: Jabalpur
- District: Narsinghpur
- Tehsil: Kareli
- Gram Panchayat: Kosamkheda

Population (2014)
  - Total: 1,846
- Demonym: Narsinghpuriya

Language
  - Official: Hindi
- Time zone: UTC+5:30 (IST)
- Pincode: 487110
- Telephone: 07793
- Vehicle registration: MP-49
- Website: https://www.kosamkheda.com/about.php

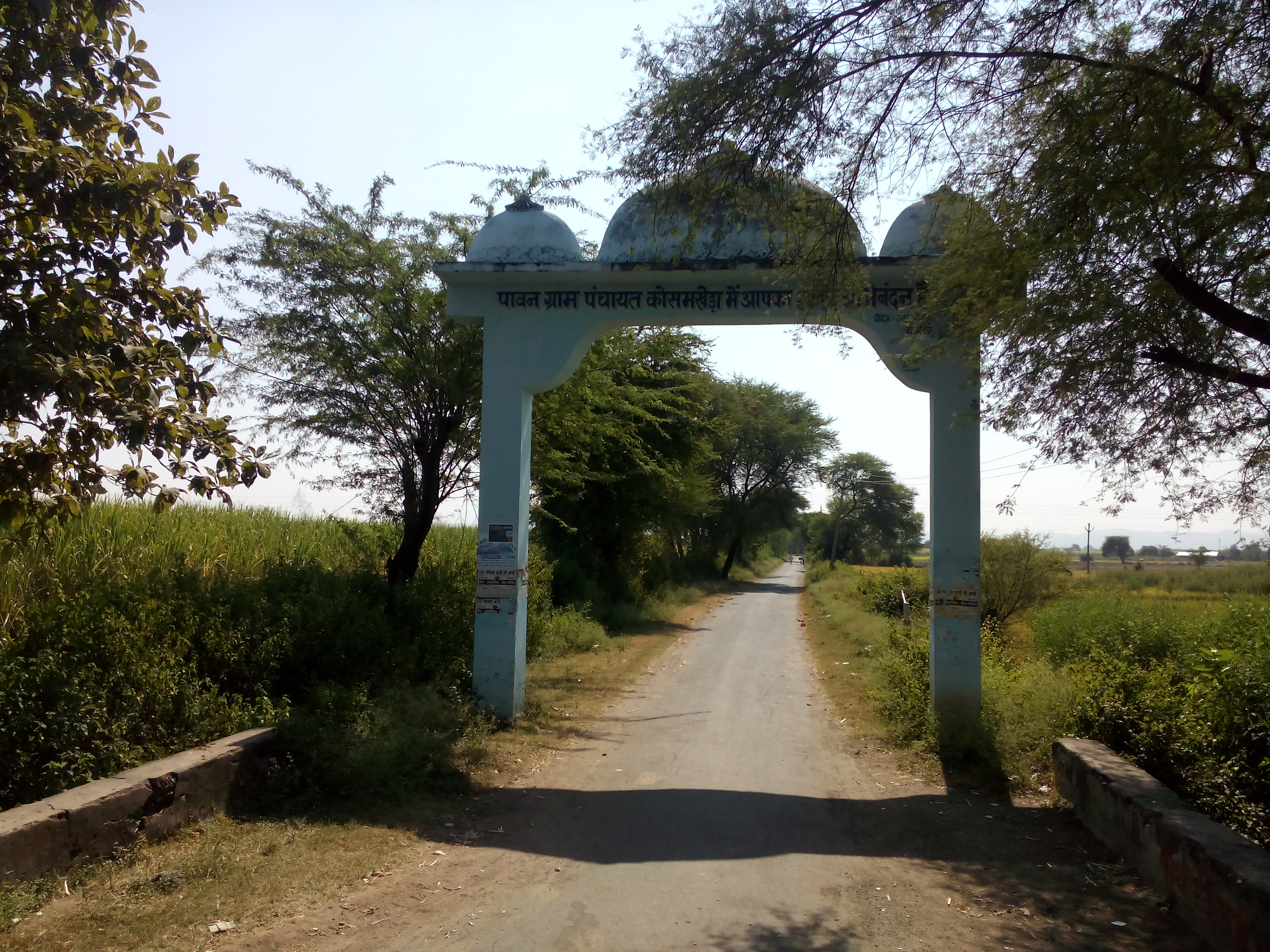
Welcome gate of Kosamkheda

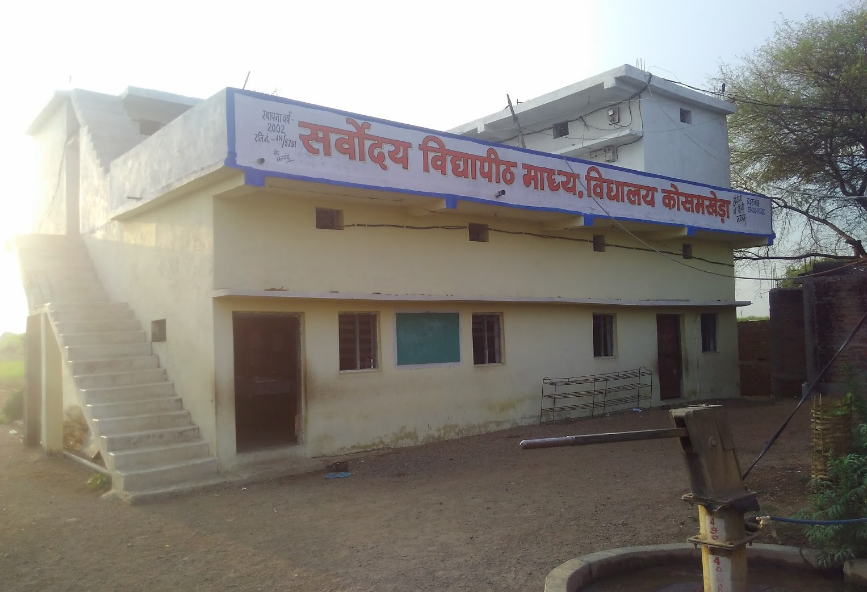

Kosamkheda (कोसमखेड़ा) is a village in Kareli Tehsil, located in the Narsinghpur District of Madhya Pradesh State, India. It is part of Jabalpur Division.

Kosamkheda is situated near Satpura mountain, which is 10 km away. Kosamkheda's sun rise time varies 13 minutes from IST.

Kosamkheda is a farming based village. Almost all of the people who live there do farming for a living. Most of the business in the village is the product of raw food, vegetables, fruits, oil-seed, and milk products (milk, khowa, butter and buttermilk).

== Facilities ==
=== Education ===
==== Government primary school (GPS) ====
Kosamkheda has only one primary school. It was established in 1954. The lowest class is first grade and the highest class in the school is fifth.

==== Government middle school (GMS) ====
Kosamkheda school was recognized by the Department of Education in 1961. The school is upper primary only. The lowest grade is 6th and the highest grade in the school is 8th.

=== Health services ===
The village contains one sub-health center, one private dispensary and one animal health center.

=== Water ===
In Kosamkheda village all houses are connected with water pipe lines. The village also contains over 20 hand pumps for drinking water. For farming, the village contains wells, tube wells, canals and a dam. There is also a water tank which was established in 2004.

In Kosamkheda Gram Panchayat, the number of hand pumps is 63.

=== Electricity ===
Electricity was brought to the village in 1975.

== Culture ==
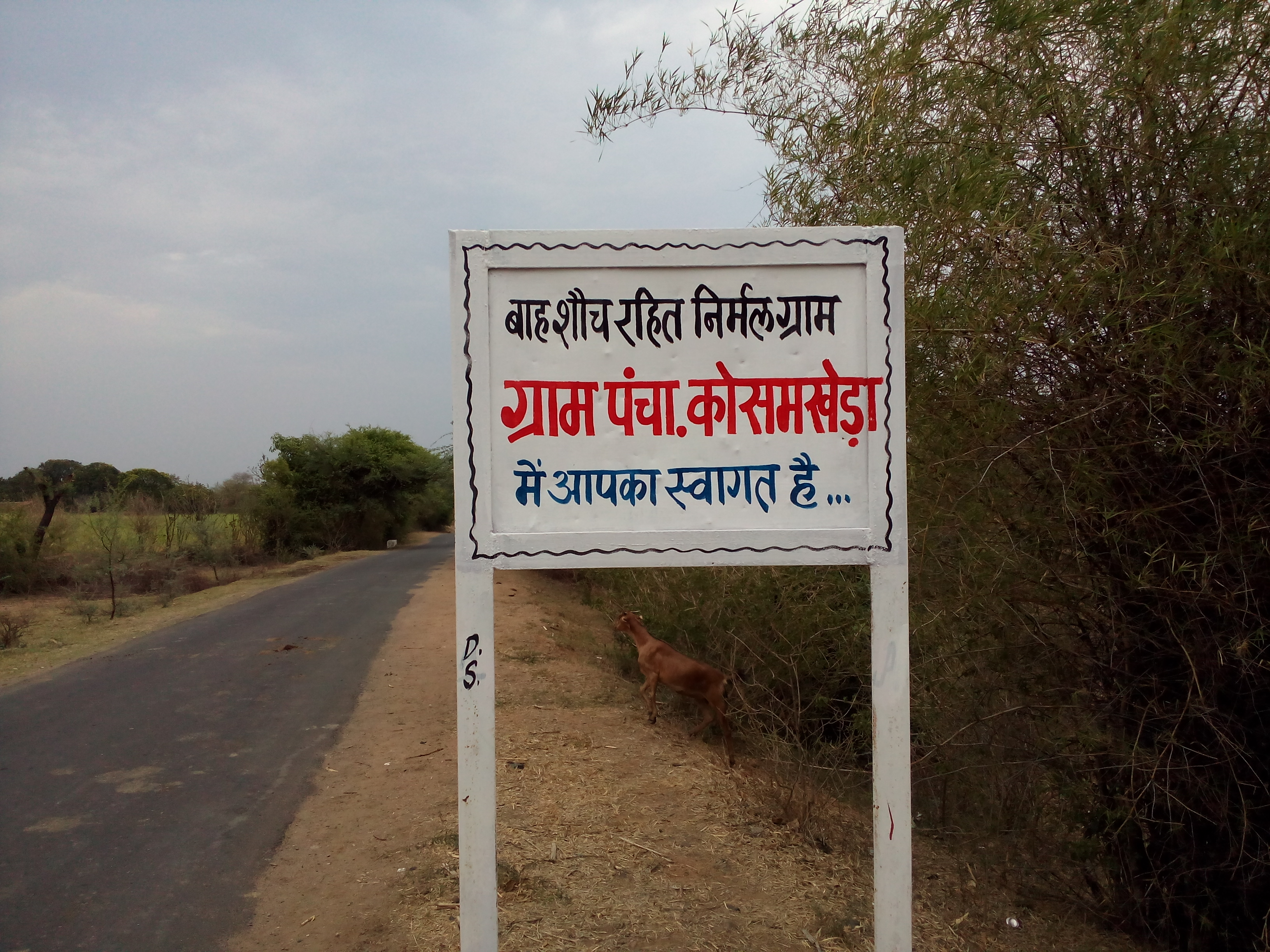
Nirmal Gram Kosamkheda

The majority of the population in Kosamkheda are Hindus. The official language of Kosamkheda is Hindi. In addition, a local language known as Narsinghpuria is popular in the village.

== Transport ==
=== Railway stations ===
There is no railway station near to Kosamkheda in less than 10 km. The below stations are commonly used by villages living there.

no.	Railway station name	Distance
01	Narsinghpur Railway Station	12 km
02	Kareli Railway Station	13 km
03	Jabalpur Railway Station	99 km
04	Bhopal Railway Station	214 km

=== Airports ===
Sl. no.	Location	ICAO Airport code	IATA Airport code	Airport name	Type	Distance
International airports
1	Bhopal	VOCL	COK	Raja Bhoj Airport	International (seasonal)	213 km
2	Indore	VAID	IDR	Devi Ahilyabai Holkar Airport	International (seasonal)	-
Domestic / regional airports
3	Gwalior	VIGR	GWL	Rajmata Vijaya Raje Scindia Air Terminal	Domestic	-
4	Jabalpur	VAJB	JLR	Dumna Airport	Domestic	92 km
