= Saroj Raj Choudhury =

Indian environmentalist, wildlife conservationist, and writer

- Born: Odisha, India
- Occupation: Wildlife conservationist
- Known for: Project Tiger
- Awards: Padma Shri

Saroj Raj Choudhury was an Indian environmentalist, wildlife conservationist, writer, and the first Forest Conservator under the Government of Odisha. He was also the founder director of the Simlipal National Park, in the Mayurbhanj district in the Indian state of Odisha. Choudhury was known for the pugmark technique he employed for tiger census and for his comradeship with Khairi, a domesticated tigress. His experiences with the animal has been documented in a book, Khairi: The Beloved Tigress, written by him and published in 1977. The Government of India awarded him the fourth highest Indian civilian honour of Padma Shri, in 1983.

== Biography ==
Saroj Raj Choudhury, born in Odisha, started his career as a forest officer in the Government of Odisha’s service and rose in ranks to become a wildlife conservation officer, the first person to occupy the post. Later, he was transferred as the head of the Forest Research Institute, founded in 1878 by the German forester, Dietrich Brandis. When Simlipal Tiger Reserve was established in 1972, Choudhury was made its founder field director and the head of Project Tiger with his headquarters in Baripada.

1974 was a landmark year in Choudhury's life when the Kharia tribals brought a female tiger cub found near the Khairi river. He and Nihar Nalini Swain, took the cub into their care and converted their quarters at Jashipur in such a way to accommodate the wild animal. The cub, named Khairi after the river she was found near, remained with the couple for number of years even after it was full grown. They also reared several other wild animals at their residence such as a crocodile, a bear cub named Jumbu, a blind hyena called Baina and a mongoose, all of them roamed free in his courtyard.

Choudhury was credited with several initiatives in the field of wildlife conservation. He was the first to introduce the pugmark methodology for the census of tigers in India, a technique he introduced while heading the first tiger census in India in 1972 which later became a popular method used all over India. Based on his observations of Khairi and by maintaining a daily log of Khairi's movements, he conducted research on the behaviour patterns of tigers, especially on the topic of pheromones, which helped the later day research of R. L. Brahmachary on the subject. He also introduced the use of tranquilizers for capturing wild tuskers. His studies have been documented by way of several papers published in journals and his autobiographical book, Khairi, The Beloved Tigress.

Choudhury had close ties with other conservationists such as Salim Ali, who supported the initiative to establish Khairi Wildlife Institute, which did not materialise, allegedly due to disinterestedness shown by the authorities. The Government of India awarded him the Padma Shri, India's fourth-highest civilian honor, in 1983. Choudhury, did not survive Khairi for long, after the tigress was euthanised by an overdose of tranquilizers when she contracted rabies from a dog bite.

== Bibliography ==
- Saroj Raj Choudhury (2003). Khairi: The Beloved Tigress. Natraj Publishers. p. 192. ISBN 9788185019710.
- Saroj Raj Choudhury (1974). "Maintenance of Wildlife Sanctuaries & Parks". Indian Forester. 100 (6): 373–390.
- Saroj Raj Choudhury (1975). "Forestry and Wildlife Conservation in the Tropics". Indian Forester. 101 (1): 45–46.
- Saroj Raj Choudhury (1977). "Grass Tracer". Indian Forester. 103 (7): 454–457.
- Saroj Raj Choudhury (1977). "Olfaction Ecology of Peak Cudding in Similipal Tigers". Indian Forester. 103 (9): 577–583.
- Saroj Raj Choudhury (1980). "Olfaction, Marking and Oestrus in a Tiger". Indian Forester. 106 (4): 233–258.

== See also ==
- Project Tiger
- Simlipal National Park
