= Damaru Ghati =

Indian Shiva temple

Coordinates: 22.9305°N 78.7968°E

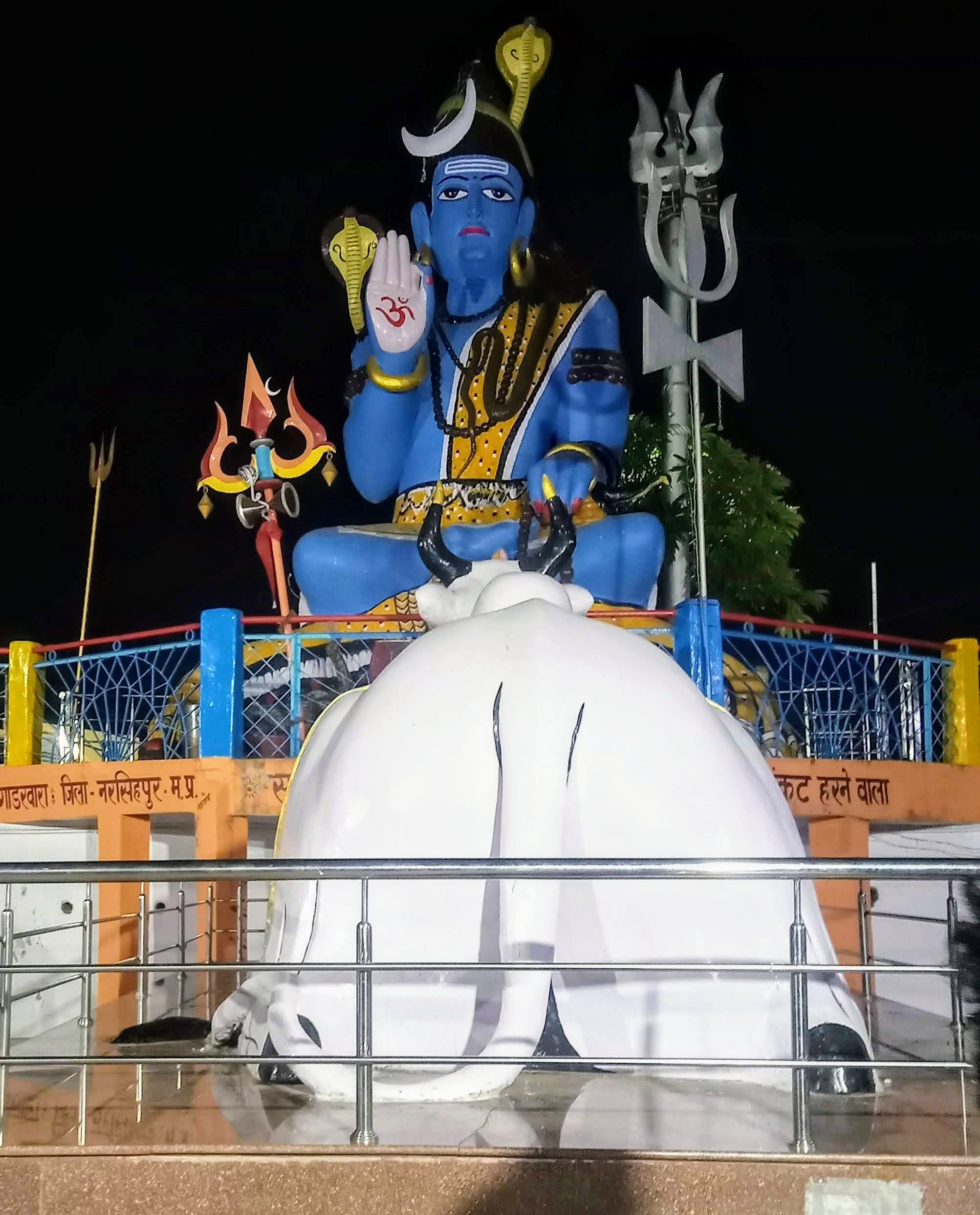
- Statues of Lord Shiva and Nandi at Damaru Ghati

Religion
- Affiliation: Hinduism
- District: Narsinghpur
- Deity: Lord Shiva
- Festival: Mahashivratri

Location
- State: Madhya Pradesh
- Country: India
- Interactive map of Damaru Ghati

Damaru Ghati is a Shiva temple in Madhya Pradesh, India. It is built in a valley shaped like a Damaru. It is located near the Gadarwara city. A shivalinga is established inside a temple shaped like a shivalinga. Statues of Lord Shiva, Nandi and Lord Hanuman are also present in the temple. Every year, thousands of tourists and devotees visit the temple to worship Lord Shiva during Mahashivaratri.

== History ==
The construction of the temple began 2 decades ago. The shape of the sand dunes on the banks of Shakkar River in Gadarwara was similar to a Damaru. People started calling it 'Damaru Ghati'. The construction of the temple was started by SDOP BS Parihar, who was posted in Gadarwara, in collaboration with the local citizens.

== Structure ==
A foundation of 15 ft (4.6 m) has been given to the temple. 10 ft (3.0 m) below the statue of Lord Shiva, a 7 ft (2.1 m). high statue of Nandi is built. Nandi faces towards Lord Shiva. A huge Shivalinga is built of approximately 100 ft (30 m). The total height of the shivalinga from the ground to the top is 51 ft (16 m). 15 ft (4.6 m) high stairs are built for people's convenience. The length inside the shivalinga is 21 ft (6.4 m) and the diameter is 65 ft (20 m). 2 decorated gates have been built to enter the temple.

== Gallery ==
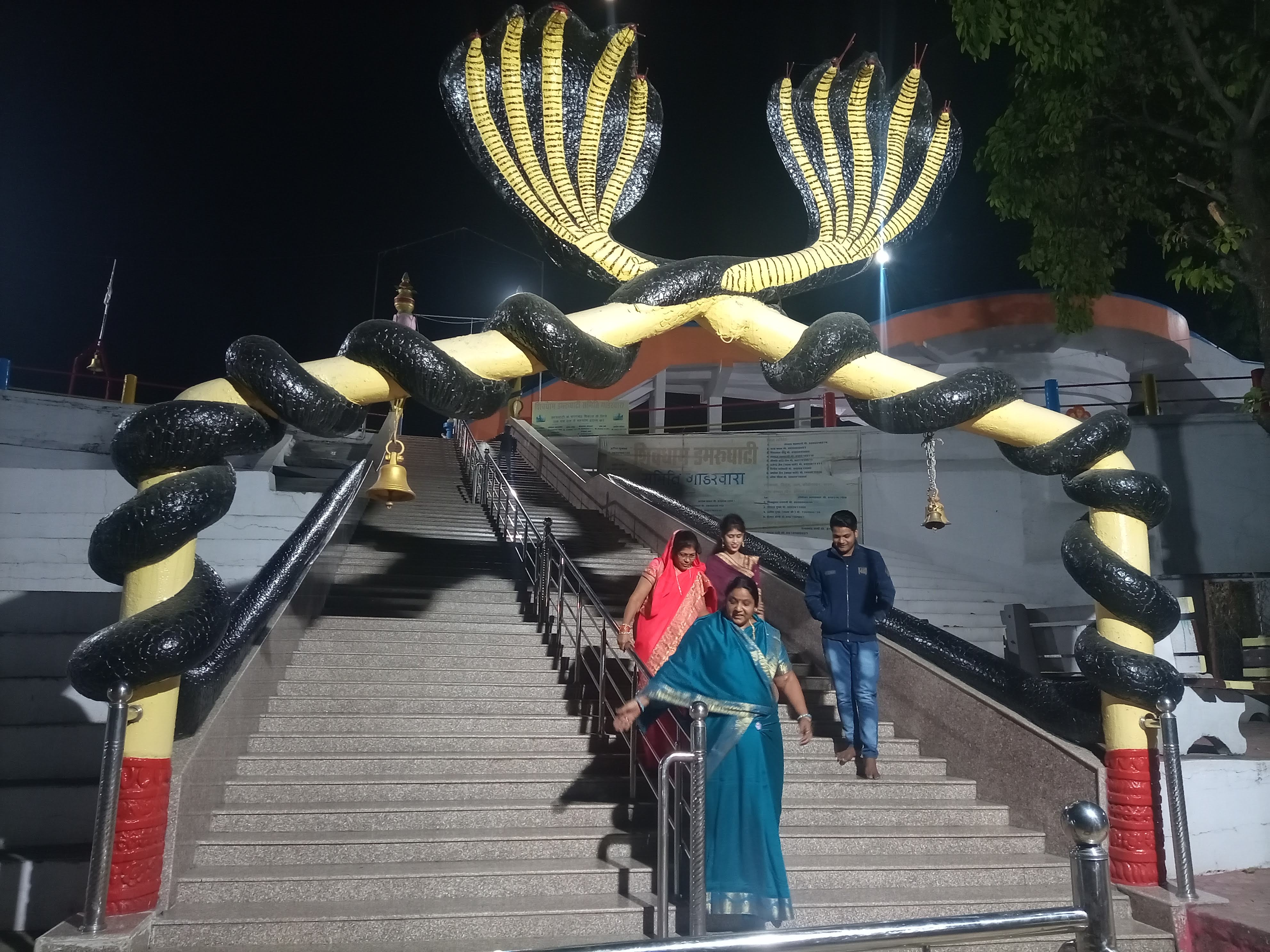
Entrance of the Damru Ghati temple

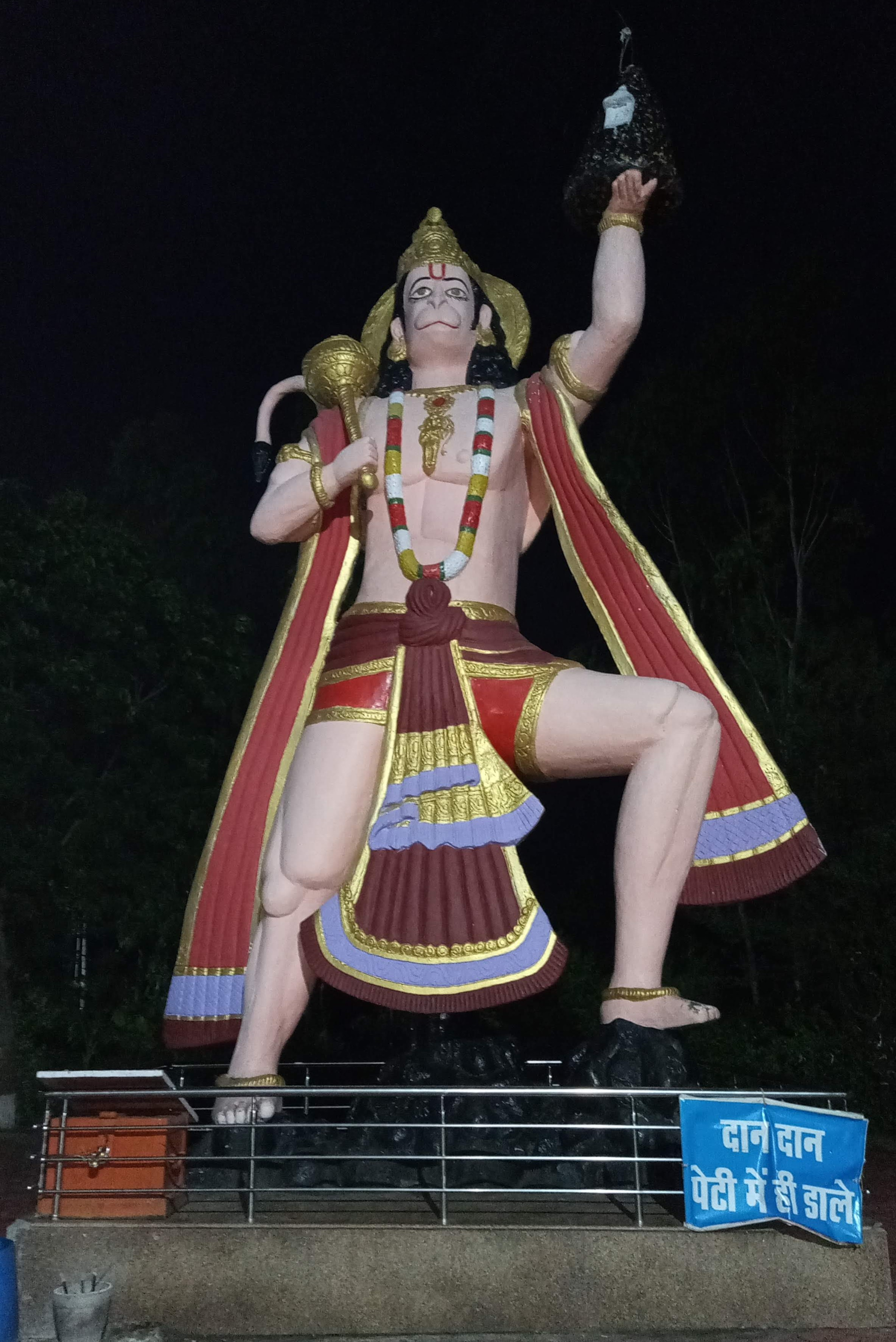
Statue of Lord Hanuman present in Damaru Ghati

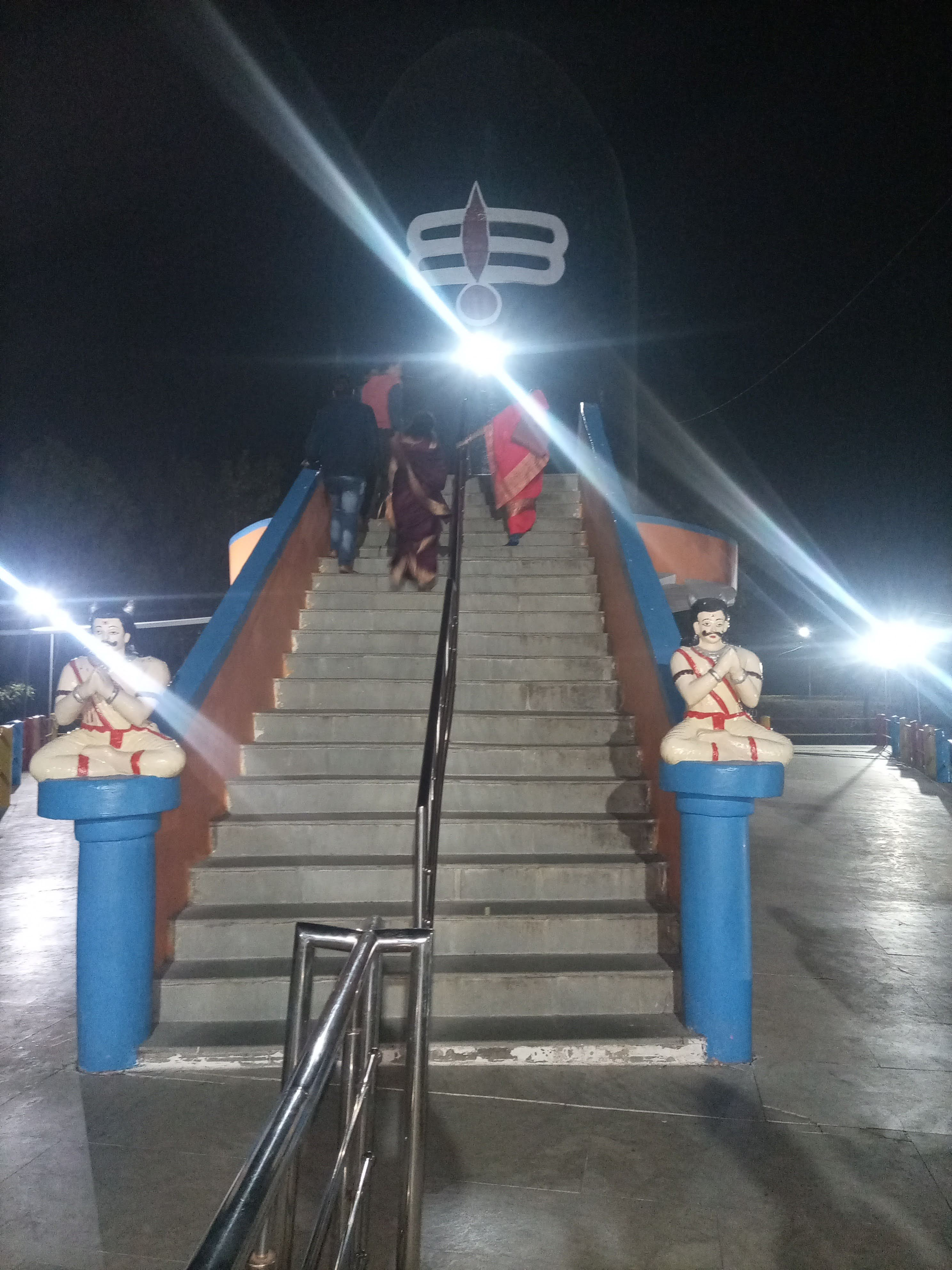
Shivalinga-shaped temple inside the Damaru Ghati temple

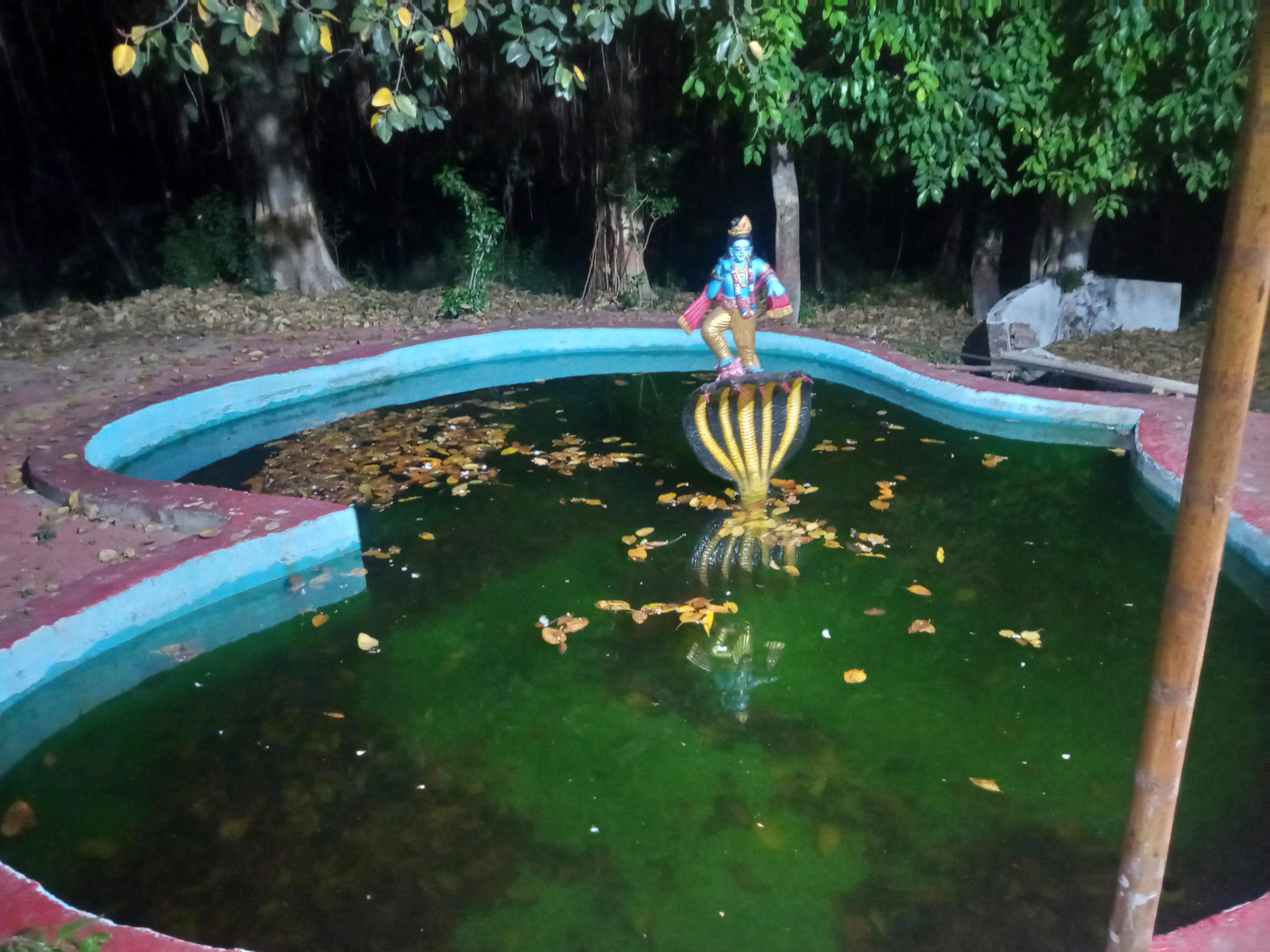
Pond inside the Damaru Ghati temple
