= Kareli, Madhya Pradesh =

Kareli
- City
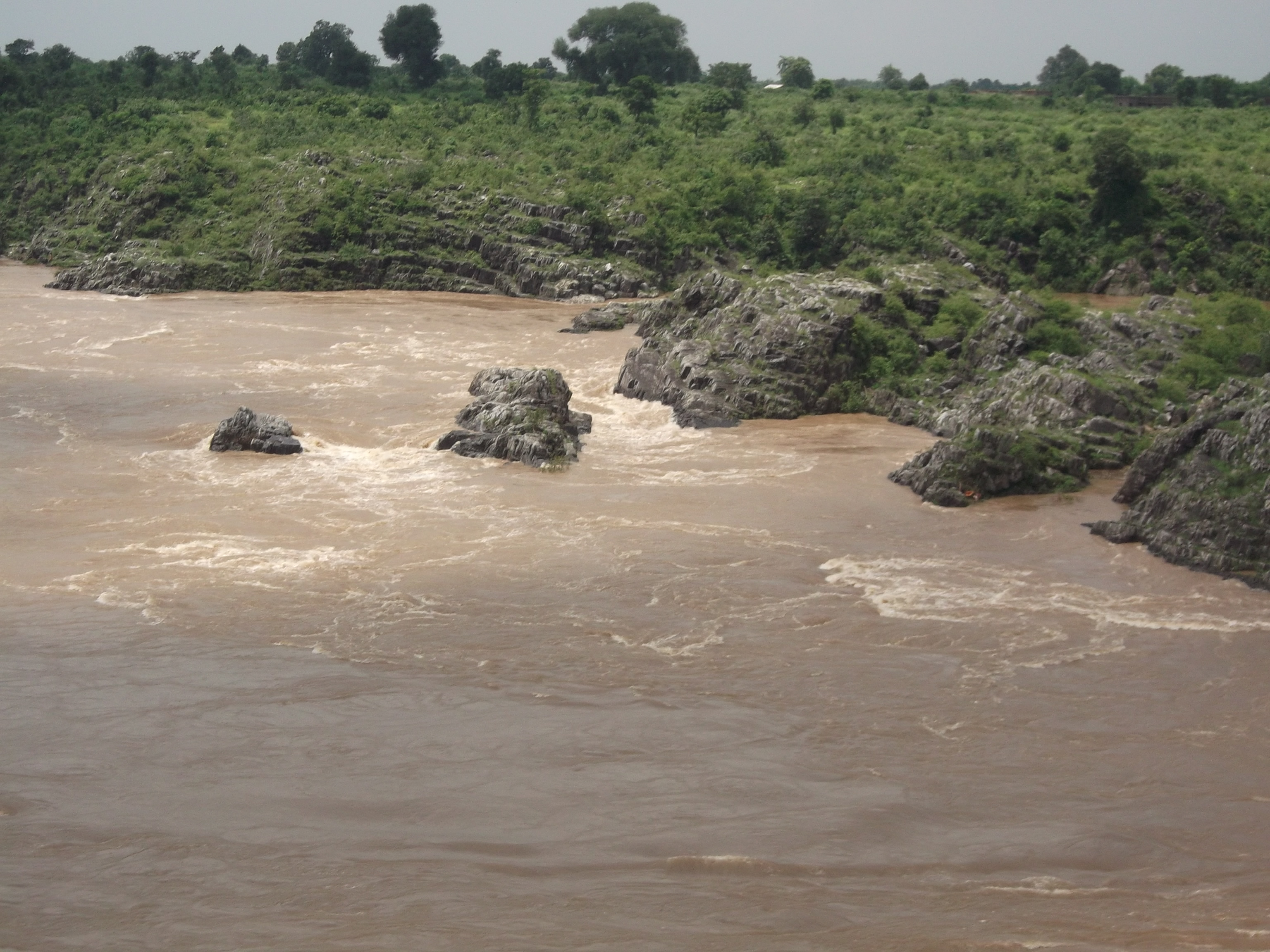
- Narmada River flows Near Kareli

- Location in Madhya Pradesh, India Kareli (India)
- Coordinates: 22.9336171°N 79.0622162°E
- Country: India
- State: Madhya Pradesh
- District: Narsinghpur

Government
  - Type: Local government
  - Body: Municipality

Area
  - Total: 6.25 km^{2} (2.41 sq mi)
- Elevation: 348 m (1,142 ft)

Population (2011)
  - Total: 29,929
  - Density: 4,790/km^{2} (12,400/sq mi)
- Demonym: 920

Languages
  - Official: Hindi
- Time zone: UTC+5:30 (IST)
- PIN: 487221
- Telephone code: 07793
- Vehicle registration: MP-49

Kareli is a city and a Municipality in the Indian state of Madhya Pradesh. Kareli is financial capital of the district Narsinghpur. Kareli is considered as best production town for Jaggery in India. Jaggery produced in Kareli is a single kadhai Jaggery which is highly demanded in many parts of India. It is well connected by transportation. Near Kareli, an ancient fair called Barmaan Mela is organised every year in the month of January on the bank of the river Narmada. There are many historic and religious places in Kareli like Chougan Quila, Deepeshwar Temple Barmaan, Deepeshwar temple is dedicated to lord Shiva. It is also taposthali (worship place) of lord Bramha. India's longest highway NH-44 (Old Name-NH-26) passes through Kareli and also connected to almost every part of the country by rail network. Before the construction of the Bina-Katni branch of the Indian Midland Railway, the metaled road from Saugor crossing the Nerbudda at Barmhan brought the bulk of the produce of the Sagar District to Kareli station. A mail cart ran from Kareli to Sagar, a distance of 122 km (76 mi). The trade of Kareli has now considerably declined, but it is still the exporting station for the southern parts of the Rehli tahsil of Sagar and the north of Narsinghpur. A cotton-ginning factory, the property of Raja Gokul Das, was opened in 1904. This is the nearest rail station and market for towns of Sagar district. Kareli is also educational hub for nearby area Schools like Govt. C.M.Rise School, Carmel School, Maharana Pratap School, Mahatma Gandhi College and many coaching institutes are situated. Agriculture based business are still doing well in the area like Kareli Sugar Mills, Dal Mills, there are many Tuar dal Mills in the city like Chacha Dal Mill, Oil plants like Shubham industries, Flour Mills like Malviya Mills, Jaggery Factories.

== Local administration ==
Kareli is a Tehsil Headquarter and a Development Block in Narsinghpur District. Kareli was formerly a municipality but its municipal constitution was abolished in 1897, and the provisions of the Village Sanitation Act were introduced.

=== Local governance ===
There are 15 wards in Kareli municipality and the Nagar Palika Adhyaksha (Mayor) is the chief of the municipality.

=== Civil administration ===
There are Sub-Divisional Magistrate and Tehsildar office.

=== Law and order ===
Kareli Police Station/ Thana with the office of the Deputy Superintendent of Police (DSP). In addition, nearest Railway police Chowky of Railway Protection Force is at Kareli.

=== Judiciary ===
There is an office of the Civil Judge.

== Geography ==
Kareli is located at 22.9336171°N 79.0622162°E. It has an average elevation of 348 metres (1,142 ft).

Main villages: Dilheri, Umariya, Amgoan, Mohad, Amhenta, Jowa, Bhugwara, Pipariya, and Khiriya.

== Demographics ==
Kareli is a Municipality city in the district of Narsimhapur, Madhya Pradesh. Kareli city is divided into 15 wards for which elections are held every five years. The Kareli Municipality has population of 29,929 of which 15,592 are males while 14,337 are females as per report released by Census India 2011.

The population of children aged 0–6 is 3415 which is 11.41% of total population of Kareli (M). In Kareli Municipality, the female sex ratio is 920 against state average of 931. Moreover, the child sex ratio in Kareli is around 873 compared to the Madhya Pradesh state average of 918. The literacy rate of Kareli is 86.28% higher than the state average of 69.32%. In Kareli, male literacy is around 90.60% while the female literacy rate is 81.62%.

Kareli Municipality has total administration over 6,490 houses to which it supplies basic amenities like water and sewerage. It is also authorized to build roads within municipality limits and impose taxes on properties coming under its jurisdiction.

Population rise of Kareli as a municipality is 18,791 in 1991, 25,043 in 2001 and 29,929 in 2011.

The sub district is home to about 1.6 lakh people, among them about 83 thousand (52%) are male and about 77 thousand (48%) are female. 72% of the whole population are from general caste, 15% are from schedule caste and 13% are schedule tribes. Child (aged under 6 years) population of Kareli tahsil is 13%, among them 52% are boys and 48% are girls. There are about 37 thousand households in the sub district and an average 4 persons live in every family. The majority of the population, nearly 76% (about 1.2 lakh) live in Kareli Sub District rural part and 24% (about 38 thousand) population live in the Kareli Sub District urban part.

== Agriculture ==
Kareli is biggest Gur Mandi (Market of JAGGERY) of Madhya Pradesh. Sugar industry has seen a significant progress in the last decade. It is also well known for its fertile land. The black soil is suited for any kind of cultivation and there are adequate irrigation facilities. It is famous for its rich agricultural production. It is situated in the upper part of Narmada Valley, which is of much important for agriculture. The production of grains is more than the local requirement. For agriculture both old and new techniques are equally in practice. For old equipment, there are ploughs, bullock carts, bakhar, hansiya, and various types of knives and khurpi. In new methods or techniques, there are: thrashers, tractors, harvesters, electric pumps and sprinklers. Along with these better quality seeds and the best quality pesticides are used.

== Crops ==
Mainly crops are cultivated in two seasons, Rabi and Kharif. This is based on the climate and the conditions prevails in the district by the time.

During Rabi, crops are cultivated in October–November, with cutting in April/May. The major Rabi crops are wheat, pulses, peas, alsi and masoor.

During Kharif, the farming period is June–July with cutting in October. The major Kharif crops are: paddy, jowar, bajra, makka, kondo and kutki.

The major commercial crops are soybeans and sugarcane, which is produced in large quantity and a major source of income. Soybean is used for oil extraction, and sugarcane for sugar and gur.

== Industry ==
Being an agricultural land, large industries are rare in the area. Also most of the industrial institutions are agricultural-oriented.

Gur/sugar from sugarcane: In many places, gur has been prepared from sugarcane all over the district.

Daal Mills: Tuwar (arhar) pulses are prepared here.

Oil Mills: There are many oil mills where soybean and groundnut are extracted.

There are number of oil franchises like Madhuri, Kriti, Satyam pvt.ltd.

Other industries include cement pipes, paper mills, plastic and rubber, leather goods, earthen utensils and pots. Poultry farms, goat farming, and fish farming.

== Climate ==
The climate is generally pleasant except in summer. Waves move slowly except during the south-west monsoon. The usual minimum temperature rests around 25–26 degrees Celsius (77–79 °F), and the maximum temperature rises up to 40–45 °C (104–113 °F). May is the hottest month of the year. It is very excessively hot during summer, and in the end of this season dust storms come. When the monsoon arrives, the hygrometer mercury goes very low. The 90% rainfall is observed during monsoon months only; i.e., June to September. The average rainfall is of 60 days per year, and measures approximately 40 inches (1,016 mm). During December–January it is cold, and the average temperature during day time is around 9 °C (48 °F) and 3.2 °C (38 °F) at night. Sometimes cold waves also occur, and heavy fog is also observed.

== Tourism ==
=== Bramhan Ghat ===
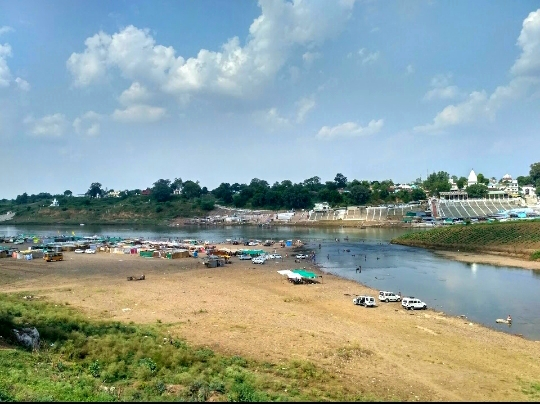
Barman Ghat Bank of Narmada River

Barman is situated at NH 44 (Srinagar-Kanyakumari Highway) and 12 kilometres (7 mi) away from Kareli railway station, and the bank of river Narmada. Lord Brahma's Yagya Shala, Deepeshwar Temple, Rani Durgawati Temple, Elephant Gate and Varahas Statue are places of tourist interest there. The Narmada River flows in seven strains. It flows on the occasions of Makar Sankranti to Basant Panchami. Mela has been arranged in which District Administration also takes part. Also organized are different stalls of the district Govt. Depot. This exhibition has the display of the Agriculture Depot, co-operative, education, and health. Different beneficial schemes information and achievement have shown throes which people get benefit out of this exhibition, and also avail the district out of 20% on different sale items.

=== Fort of Chougan/Chauragharh ===
The fort is 30 km (19 mi) from Kareli railway station. The station is of a very ancient time and not much remains of this fort which was built by Genha dynasty's King, Gond, Sangram Shah in the 15th century. One Narsinghpur district near Barheta village Nonia is also a place having archaeological importance. Here six large statues are inside Parkota, which is known as Pandav, math statue.

== Literature ==
Kalidas Baghel (श्री प्रेम माते) is Senior Poet and well known philosopher of Kareli.

== Transportation ==
=== Airways ===
The nearest airports are Dumna Airport (Jabalpur Airport), Jabalpur (117 km) and Raja Bhoj Airport, Bhopal (220 km).

=== Roadways ===
Kareli is located on the NH 44 North-South Corridor (Srinagar-Kanyakumari) and MP-SH 22 (Sandalpur–Hoshangabad-Piparia-Narsinghpur–Jabalpur-Dindori) The buses from and to Jabalpur, Bhopal, Indore, Chhindwara, Narsinghpur, Gadarwara, Sagar, Pipariya, Hoshangabad are available.

=== Railways ===
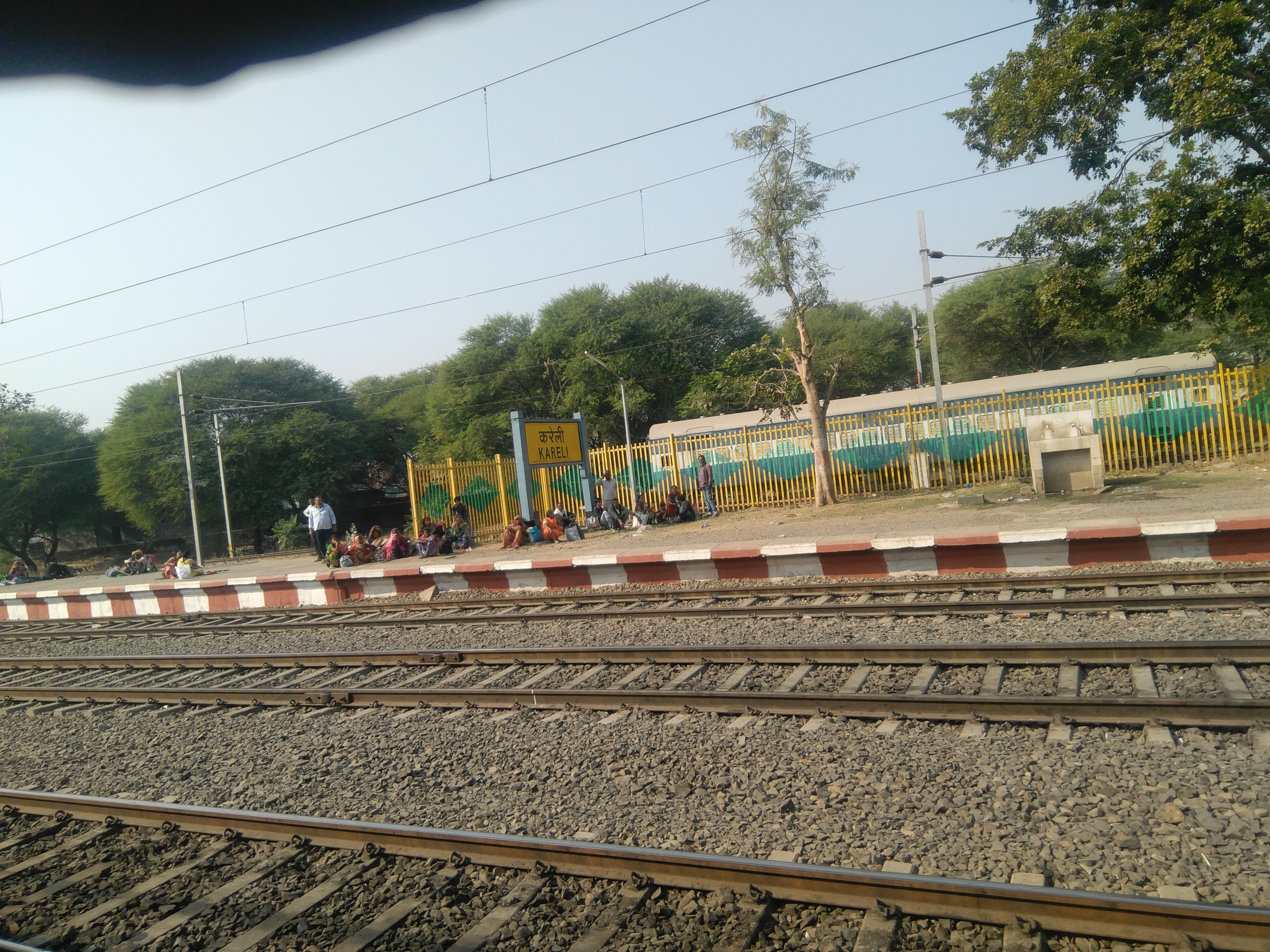
Kareli Railway Station

Kareli has a well connectivity with the rail network of India, located between Mumbai-Allahabad-Kolkata Rail Route, Many trains running between Mumbai, Jabalpur, Allahabad has stoppage at Kareli Railway Station.

Kareli railway station is under the Jabalpur railway division of West Central Railway zone. In 1869–71, brothers Ladhha Bharmal Chawda and Ramji Bharmal Chawda of Chandiya were the main contractors for Great Indian Peninsula Railway. The railway built 153 miles long railway track from Itarsi to Jabalpur. The station of Kareli along with Bagra Tawa, Sohagpur, Pipariya, Gadarwara were also built by them. With completion of this line on 7 March 1870, the Great Indian Peninsula Railway got connected with East Indian Railway network with Jubbulpore (Jabalpur) as the Junction.

Kareli has daily running trains for New Delhi, Mumbai, Kolkata, Bhopal, Indore, Jabalpur, Itarsi, Gwalior, Allahabad, Varanasi, Patna and several other places in India. The nearest junction is Itarsi (145 km), one of the biggest junctions in India. Another near junction is Jabalpur (100 km) which is also the zonal office of the west central rail zone.
