= Shridham railway station =

Railway station in Madhya Pradesh, India

Shridham / Gotegaon (श्रीधाम, सृधम/ गोटेगांव)

General information
- Location: Chhota Chhindwara, Narsinghpur district, Madhya Pradesh; India
- Coordinates: 23°02′04″N 79°29′06″E
- Elevation: 372 metres (1,220 ft)
- System: Indian Railways station
- Owner: Indian Railways
- Operator: West Central Railway
- Line: Jabalpur–Bhusaval section
- Platforms: 3
- Tracks: 3

Construction
- Structure type: Standard (on ground)
- Parking: No
- Cycle facilities: No

Other information
- Status: Functioning
- Station code: SRID
- Zone(s): West Central Railway
- Division(s): Jabalpur
Location
- Location within India Location within Madhya Pradesh

Shridham railway station is a railway station in Narsinghpur district, Madhya Pradesh. Its code is SRID. It serves Chhota Chhindwara town. The station consists of three platforms. Passenger, MEMU, Express, and Superfast trains halt here.
