= Chichli =

Chichli Pital Nagri Chichli
- Census town
- Location in Madhya Pradesh, India Chichli (India)
- Coordinates: 22.83°N 78.82°E
- Country: India
- State: Madhya Pradesh
- District: Narsimhapur
- Elevation: 349 m (1,145 ft)

Population (2011)
  - Total: 14,225

Languages
  - Official: Hindi
- Time zone: UTC+5:30 (IST)
- Postal code: 487770

Chichli is a census town in Narsimhapur district in the state of Madhya Pradesh, India.

== Geography ==
Chichli is located at 22.83°N 78.82°E. It has an average elevation of 349 metres (1,145 feet). Chichli is located at about 200 km from Bhopal the capital of the state of Madhya Pradesh and 9 km from Gadarwara. The Sakkar and Seeta Reva rivers flow through it rendering the surrounding farmland fertile. The larger Narmada River is 26 km away. Gadarwara lies on the main road from Jabalpur to Mumbai 30 miles west of Narsinghpur civil station.

== History ==
This area was not too active in the Indian struggle for independence. There are a few notable cases. During the mass demonstration of satyagraha at Chichli in 1932, Mansharam and Gauradevi lost their lives during a police firing.

== Industry ==
Chichli is famous for making brass pots, also called Brass Township because all types of metal pots are made here.

== Places of interest ==
- Chougan Kila Historical destination. From Chichli 20 km/2 hours journey.
- Rani Dahar Nature destination. From Chichli 10 km/2 hours journey.
- Luck Mahadev Religious destination. From Chichli 18 km/2 hours journey.
- Chota Jabalpur Nature destination. From Chichli 10 km/2 hours journey.
- Damru ghati Gadarwada Mandir destination. From Chichli 15 km/2 hours journey

== Transport ==
=== Rail ===
A distance of 9 km away is the Gadarwara Railway Station.

=== Local transport ===
Chichli has a public transport system. Local transport also includes auto rickshaw, van and local city buses called Nagar Seva. Many cab services have recently started serving the town.

== Sport ==
Kabaddi is known game of Chichli, Every year an organized Dolgyaras fair in Rajmahal takes place.

== Demographics ==
As of 2001 India census, Chichli had a population of 9250. Males constitute 53% of the population and females 47%. Chichli has an average literacy rate of 66%, higher than the national average of 59.5%; with male literacy of 71% and female literacy of 59%. 15% of the population is under 6 years of age.
