= Salichauka Babai =

Town in Madhya Pradesh, India

Salichauka babai
- Town
- Location in Madhya Pradesh, India Salichauka babai (India)
- Coordinates: 22.83°N 78.67°E
- Country: India
- State: Madhya Pradesh
- District: Narsinghpur District

Government
  - Type: Nagar panchayat

Population (2011)
  - Total: 8,008

Languages
  - Official: Hindi
- Time zone: UTC+5:30 (IST)
- Postal code: 470226
- ISO 3166 code: IN-MP
- Vehicle registration: MP-49

Salichauka Babai is a town and a nagar panchayat in Narsinghpur district of madhya Pradesh in India.

== Geography ==
Babai is Located on 22.83°N 78.67°E. This town is 65 km away from the district headquarter, it's situated on Jabalpur–Bhusaval section. The region is predominantly agrarian.

== Demographics ==
The Babai Kalan village has population of 8008 of which 4154 are males while 3854 are females as per Population Census 2011.literacy rate of Babai Kalan village was 79.99%

== Transportation ==
Babai is situated on Jabalpur–Bhusaval section rail line, with its own Railway Station which connects it to major cities of Madhya Pradesh.

It is connected to Pipariya and Gadarwara through road.
