= Barman, Madhya Pradesh =

Barbhan Bramhand Ghat
- town
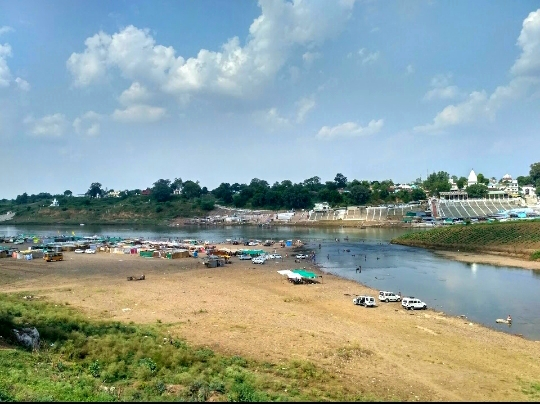
- Narmada Barman Ghat

- Location in Madhya Pradesh, India
- Coordinates: 23°2′7″N 79°1′36″E
- Country: India
- State: Madhya Pradesh
- District: Narsinghpur

Population (2011)
  - Total: 8,133

Languages
  - Official: Hindi
- Time zone: UTC+5:30 (IST)
- PIN: 487330
- Telephone code: 07793
- ISO 3166 code: IN-MP
- Vehicle registration: MP-49
- Nearest city: Narsinghpur
- Literacy: 60%%
- Climate: Normal as per season (Köppen)

Barman is a town on the banks of the Narmada River in the Narsinghpur district of Madhya Pradesh, India. It is in the Mahakoshal region in the geographic center of India.Many ancient temples can be found here. Near to Barman town is Rajmarg national highway. Barman is surrounded by Bitli Ki Pahadi, one of the major hills in Narsinghpur district. Barman is a center of education for its surrounding villages.

== Etymology ==
The name Barman is derived from the Sanskrit word Brahman. Its origin is the Brahman Ghat on the nearby Narmada River, where Brahmin caste people performed their religious rituals. An alternate spelling of Barman village is Barbhan or Barmhan.

== Physiography ==
Barman is situated 15 km from a small Town called Kareli. A square has been named as "Barman Chowk" in Kareli.

== Society and culture ==
Barman is a holy place for Hindus with two main ghat- one is the bramhan ghat and other is retghat. In Retghat every year a fair is organised in which thousands of people come from all over India""cn"". The junction of the Narmada and Warahi rivers at Brahman is a sacred place and a large fair is held here in January. A number of temples have been constructed at Barmhan, and fine flights of steps leading up from the Narmada on the northern bank.The large temple on the southern bank of the river is called Rani Durgavati's, as it is supposed to have been built by the famous queen of the Gond-Rajput dynasty of Mandla. Another temple on this side is called the Pisanhari's, as it is supposed to have been built by a corn-grinder out of her small earnings. Another important temple is that of Lakshmi Narayan. At the top of the steps on the northern bank is a great gateway called the Hathi Darwaza, as elephants can pass through it. This was built by the Lodhi malguzar of Umaria. There are several temples on this side, the principal ones being the Bairagi's temple, built by a well-known Bairagi of Indore, and a temple of Rama and Lakshman with a large pillar of stone in front, on which are depicted the past and future Avatars of Vishnu. Nearly opposite to Barmhan there is an island in the Nerbudda, and at this place five kunds or small tanks are shown which are supposed to have been used by the Pandava brothers during their sojourn at Barmhan. There is also a foot-print of Bhima.

== Administration and economy ==
The island contains a copper mine which was formerly worked by the Nerbudda Coal and Iron Company, but was abandoned as unprofitable. The fair is held in January and lasts for a month, the shops and booths being located in the bed of the Nerbudda. The attendance is heavy on the principal day of the festival of Til Sankrant. It is a very old fair and was formerly of great importance, as it was the annual occasion for the purchase of cloth, household utensils and other important commodities for the whole District. The merchandise brought to Barmhan in 1864 was estimated by the Deputy Commissioner to be worth more than 6 lakhs of rupees, of which more than half found a sale. The principal article of trade was English cloth of which two lakhs worth were received. Next to this lac ornaments and brass and copper utensils were the commonest goods. In 1892 the value of goods brought was Rs. 2-37 lakhs and that of the sales Rs. 1-57 lakhs. The total attendance is said to have been 450,000. In 1903-04 the total number of shops was 253, most of them being for the sale of cloth, metal vessels and utensils, and provisions. Statistics of the sales of produce are not available. An agricultural and cattle show is now also held and prizes are distributed by the District authorities. The village of Barmhan is held revenue-free for the support of the temple of Lakshmi Narayan.

== Places of interest ==
- Satdhara :- A religious place on Narmada river bank, where the river has split into seven streams.
