= Harr =

Harr is a surname. Notable people with the surname include:

- Burke Harr (born 1971), American politician
- Harry R. Harr (1921–1945), United States army soldier and Medal of Honor recipient
- Jonathan Harr, American writer
- Karl Erik Harr (born 1940), Norwegian artist and writer
- Karl G. Harr, Jr. (1922–2002), United States National Security Advisor
- L. T. Harr, American football coach
- Thorbjørn Harr (born 1974), Norwegian actor

== See also ==
- Haar (fog)
- Hárr, alternative name for Odin
- Haarr, people named Haarr
