= Pipariya, Jabalpur =

Pipariya
- Census town
- Location in Madhya Pradesh, India Pipariya (India)
- Coordinates: 23°13′10″N 79°33′32″E
- Country: India
- State: Madhya Pradesh
- District: Jabalpur

Population (2001)
  - Total: 4,483

Languages
  - Official: Hindi
- Time zone: UTC+5:30 (IST)
- ISO 3166 code: IN-MP
- Vehicle registration: MP

Pipariya is a census town in Jabalpur district in the Indian state of Madhya Pradesh.

== Demographics ==
As of 2001 India census, Pipariya had a population of 4483. Males constitute 52% of the population and females 48%. Pipariya has an average literacy rate of 68%, higher than the national average of 59.5%: male literacy is 77%, and female literacy is 59%. In Pipariya, 13% of the population is under 6 years of age.
