= Khairi =

Coordinates: 32°50′N 74°42′E

Khairi is a village of Tehsil Mirpur, Pakistan. It is split into Upper Khairi and Lower Khairi and has the population of around 300. The surrounding villages are called Sarthalla, Mehra and Muri.
