= Gotegaon =

Chhota Chhindwara Gotegaon
- city
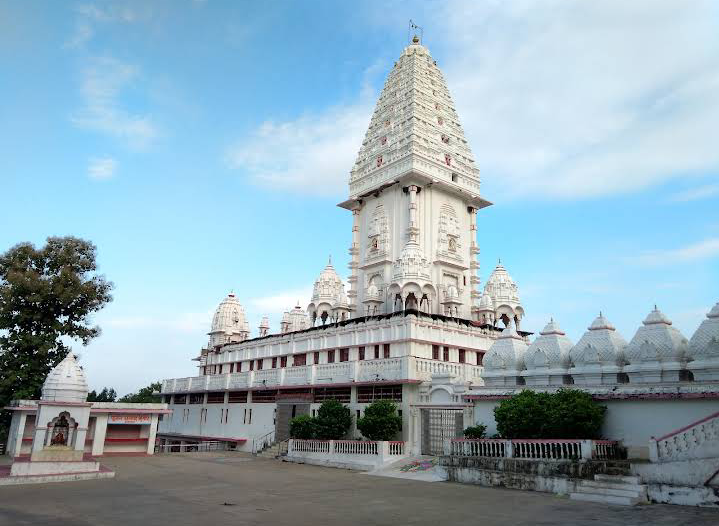
- Jhoteshawar, Gotegaon
- Nickname: Shridham
- Location in Madhya Pradesh, India Chhota Chhindwara (India)
- Coordinates: 23°2′38″N 79°29′19″E
- Country: India
- State: Madhya Pradesh
- District: Narsinghpur

Area
  - Total: 6.68 km^{2} (2.58 sq mi)

Population (01-03-2011)
  - Total: 27,068
  - Density: 4,050/km^{2} (10,500/sq mi)

Languages
  - Official: Hindi
- Time zone: UTC+5:30 (IST)
- PIN: 487118 vehicle_code_range =
- Vehicle registration: MP49

Gotegaon (Also Known Chhota Chhindwara) is a city and a municipality in Narsinghpur District of Madhya Pradesh. It is the tehsil headquarters of Narsinghpur district in Jabalpur division of Madhya Pradesh state. The district panchayat headquarters of the Panchayat and Rural Development Department of the state of Madhya Pradesh are located in Gotegaon. There are 90 panchayats under this Janpad panchayat.

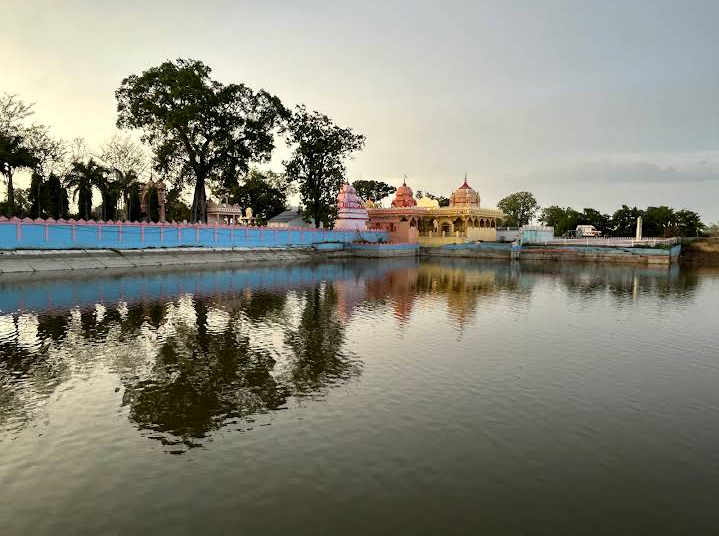
Satya sarovar, Shree baba Shree Ji aashram

Gotegaon, Narsinghpur district is located almost in the central part of the state of Madhya Pradesh, The boundary of Gotegaon Tehsil touches Jabalpur district in the north-east and Seoni district in the south.

In the local administration unit Gotegaon ( Chhota Chhindwara ) is located municipality under which there are 15 wards.

== Etymology ==
Gotegaon Tehsil headquarter is Gotegaon which was earlier named Chhota Chhindwara. This name was used in some old government institutions of the city. Then it was named Gotegaon. The reason for the name Gotegaon being applicable to the whole city is the railway station of the city, the name of the nearest village is Gotegaon Kheda. But with time, all the townspeople started using this name. The name Gotegaon is used in every government and non-government places. The name of the railway station of Gotegaon is Shridham. The temple of Maa Rajrajeswari Tripura Sundari Devi is 15 km away from Gotegaon Tehsil Headquarter. It is also a sightseeing place.

== Geography ==
Geographically Gotegaon Tehsil is situated in the east of the district. It is situated in the latitude 23°14' North Latitude 22°88' North Latitude 79°5' East Longitude 79°59' East Longitude. The extension is 33.60 from north to south and 32.65 from east to west. Tehsil headquarter is situated 44.50 km north of Tropic of Cancer. The total area of Gotegaon Tehsil is about 187 Sq.Km. Is. Narsinghpur occupies 19 percent of the area of the district. This is the second big tehsil.

In the north, Narmada river passes through about 45 km and separates Gotegaon tehsil and the border of Narsinghpur district from Jabalpur district. In the south, the border of Gotegaon tehsil and Narsinghpur district separates it from Seoni district by the Satpura mountain range. In the west, Sher river forms the boundary of Gotegaon tehsil through Narsinghpur tehsil.

== Government and politics ==
Gotegaon is the Vidhan Sabha constituency of the Madhya Pradesh Legislative Assembly, which covers the entire tehsil. Its state assembly constituency number is 118. This assembly constituency is reserved for Scheduled Castes. Mandla is the parliamentary constituency for the Lok Sabha of the country. It is noteworthy that only Gotegaon Tehsil is under the other parliamentary constituency.

Gotegaon city is Nagar Palika Parishad. There are 14 wards under the municipality.

== Economy ==
The economy of the tehsil is based on agriculture. There are some small-scale industries in the Tehsil that contribute to the primary activity.

== transportation ==
=== Air ===
Nearest airport is Dumna airport Jabalpur which is 68 km away from Gotegaon tehsil headquarter.

=== Rail ===
There are four railway stations under Gotegaon Tehsil which are Shridham, Karakbel, Vikrampur Belkhedi. The total length of the railway is 39 km. The length of the platform of Shridham Railway Station is 575 m. There are a total of 16 train stoppages at Shridham Railway Station including superfast trains, express trains and passenger trains.

It is situated on the Howrah-Mumbai railway line, whose station name is Shridham.

=== Road ===
Here State Highway No. 22 passes through here. Whose total length in Tehsil is 33.2 km

== Demographics ==
The population of Gotegaon Tehsil is around 2 lakhs. Gotegaon is the most populous city. As of 2011 India census, Gotegaon has a population of 27,068.

== Culture ==
Gotegaon has several Hindu temples, including Raj-Rajeshwari Tripur Sundari, Jhoteshwar Temple, Lodheshwar Temple and Hanuman Tekari. A seven-day mela is held during Basant Panchami.

The Kalash was installed at the top of the temple by the Late Shri Indira Gandhi, the former Prime Minister of India. Two Prime Ministers and one President of India have arrived in Jhoteshwar. The arrival of film personalities is also normal.

The family deity of the city is Thakur Baba whose temple is worth visiting. The main festival of this temple is Kajalia Parva. Which is celebrated with great pomp by the people of the city.

=== Cuisine ===
The Aalu Banda of Shridham railway station is world-famous, which is known for its spices and chutney. Potatoes have been the pride of the city for many decades. Kalakand, and khoya jalebi are very famous for sweets. The food prepared on the main occasion is Gakad-Bharta (Bharta-Bati). The taste of which people take after Narmada bath. There are many shops of chaat and gol gappas. Gotegaon city has few restaurants for North Indian food

== Education ==
There are many primary, secondary and higher secondary schools in the tehsil by the state education department. Parallel to these there are also private educational institutions. There are colleges in Tehsil Karakbel, Gotegaon and Srinagar.

== Sports ==
There is a sports stadium at the tehsil headquarters. Gotegaon has a national competition in the weather in winter. In which there are many games. This national competition is organized by Sahyog Krida Mandal (SKMG).

== See also ==
- Bagaspur
