= Gadarwara =

City in Madhya Pradesh, India

- Municipality
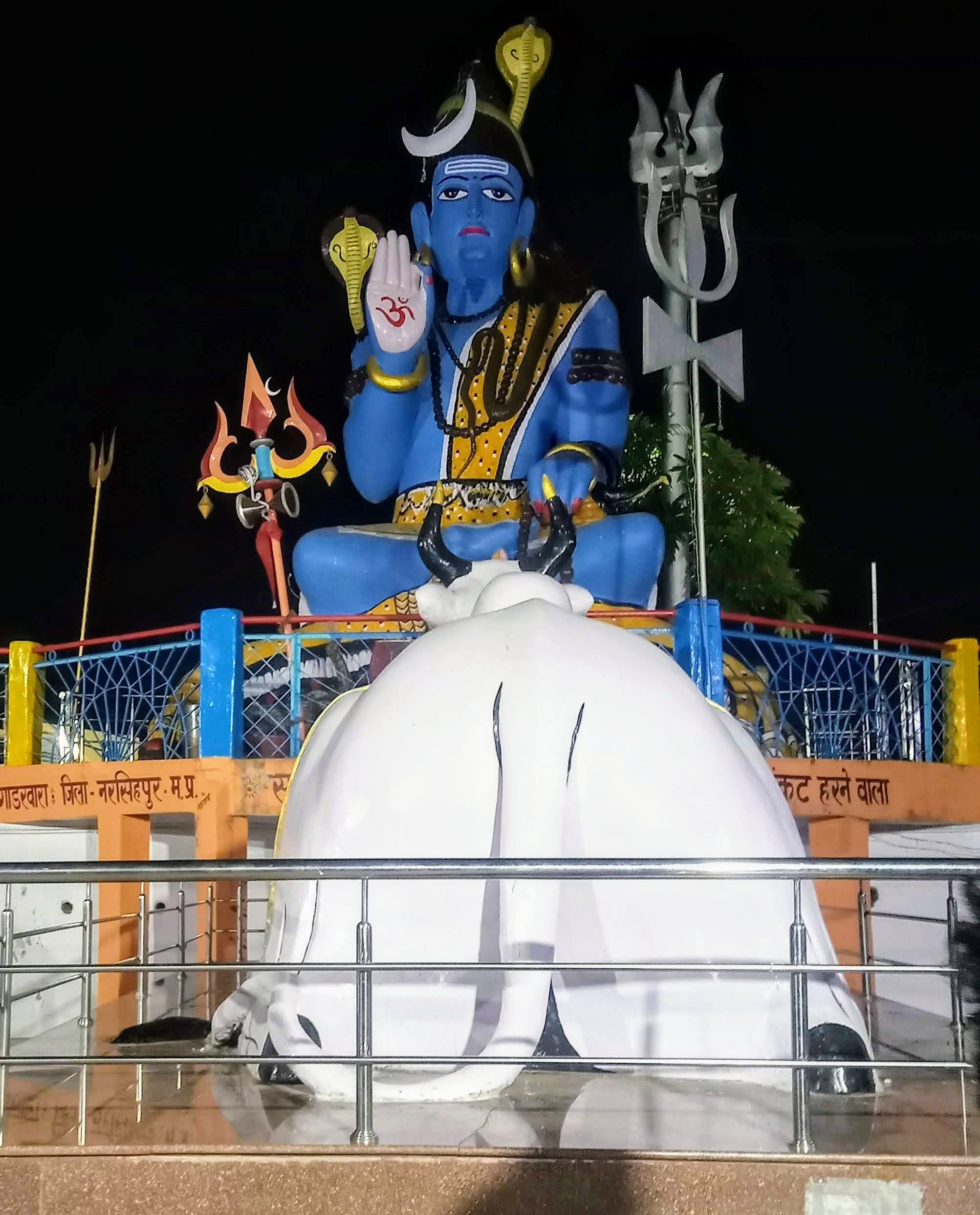
- Damaru Ghati (Shiva temple) at Gadarwara

- Location in Madhya Pradesh, India
- Coordinates: 22.92°N 78.78°E
- Country: India
- State: Madhya Pradesh
- Administrative Division: Jabalpur Division

Government
  - Type: Mayor–Council
  - Body: Gadarwara Municipalality

Area
  - Total: 100 km^{2} (39 sq mi)
- Elevation: 342 m (1,122 ft)

Population (2019*)
  - Total: 125,068
  - Density: 1,300/km^{2} (3,200/sq mi)

Languages
  - Official: Hindi
- Time zone: UTC+5:30 (IST)
- PIN: 487551
- Telephone code: 07791
- Vehicle registration: MP-49
- Website: www.gadarwaranagarpalika.org = nagarpalikagadarwara.in

Gadarwara is a city and municipality since 1867 in Narsinghpur district in the state of Madhya Pradesh, India. Gadarwara's Toor Dal brand has a unique identity in the country.

== History ==
The city of Gadarwara and its district Gadariya-kheda (now Narsinghpur) derive their names from the Gadariya caste, who are considered to be among the earliest settlers in the Narmada (Nerbudda) Valley. The Gadariya caste is also credited with constructing one of the oldest temples in India, the Gadarmal Temple, located in Vidisha, Madhya Pradesh, which dates back to the 7th century AD (approximately 1,400 years ago).

== Geography ==
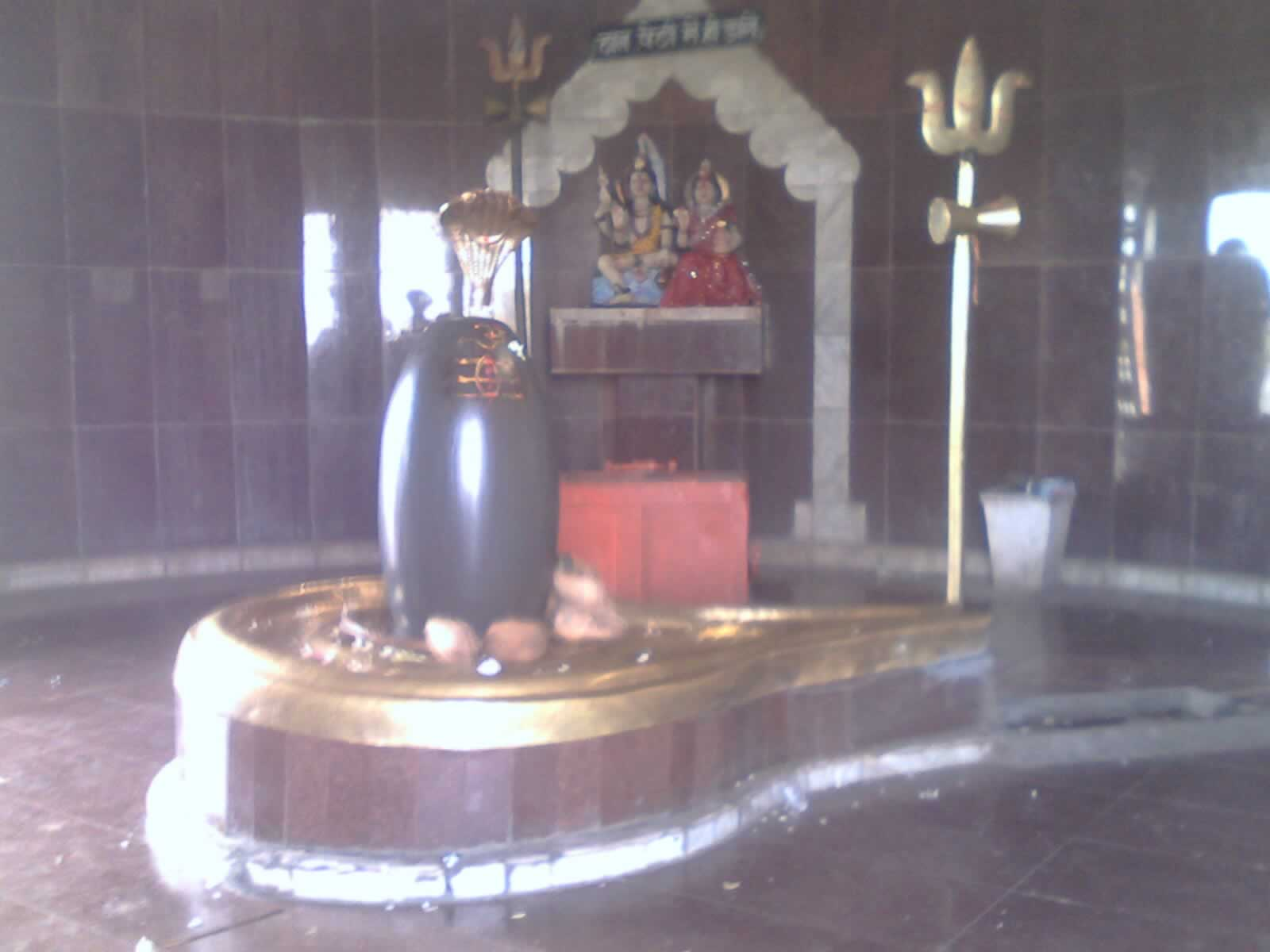
Gadarwara Damaru Ghati Inner Shiv Ling

Gadarwara is located at 22.92°N 78.78°E. It has an average elevation of 354.77 metres (1,163 feet). City has a monsoon climate. Gadarwara is 58 km from the Tropic of Cancer and is located in the south on the map of the state. The town is situated 4.5 km from the banks of the Shakkar River.

== Climate ==
Gadarwara has a humid subtropical climate typical of north-central India (Madhya Pradesh and southern Uttar Pradesh). Summer begins in late March, lasting until June. May is the hottest month, with the average temperature exceeding 45 °C (113 °F). Summer is followed by the southwest monsoon, which lasts until early October and produces 35 inches (889 mm) of rain from July to September. Average annual precipitation is nearly 55 in (1386 mm). Winter begins in late November, and lasts until early March. January is the coldest month, with an average daily temperature near 15 °C (59 °F).

Climate data for Gadarwara
Month	Jan	Feb	Mar	Apr	May	Jun	Jul	Aug	Sep	Oct	Nov	Dec	Year
Mean daily maximum °C (°F)	24.5 (76.1)	28.8 (83.8)	34.3 (93.7)	38.7 (101.7)	42.4 (108.3)	39.2 (102.6)	30.3 (86.5)	28.2 (82.8)	30.9 (87.6)	32.4 (90.3)	29.7 (85.5)	22.5 (72.5)	31.8 (89.3)
Mean daily minimum °C (°F)	5.1 (41.2)	11.4 (52.5)	16.2 (61.2)	21.2 (70.2)	24.4 (75.9)	24.1 (75.4)	22.6 (72.7)	21.9 (71.4)	21.1 (70.0)	18.1 (64.6)	13.9 (57.0)	9.6 (49.3)	17.5 (63.5)
Average precipitation mm (inches)	22.2 (0.87)	23.4 (0.92)	15.5 (0.61)	7.7 (0.30)	12.9 (0.51)	167.3 (6.59)	421.9 (16.61)	422.9 (16.65)	200.1 (7.88)	39.9 (1.57)	15.0 (0.59)	9.9 (0.39)	1,358.7 (53.49)
Average precipitation days	0.8	0.8	0.3	0.3	1.8	8.6	15.9	18.3	8.6	3.1	1.4	0.6	60.5
Mean monthly sunshine hours	288.3	274.4	288.3	306.0	325.5	210.0	105.4	80.6	180.0	269.7	273.0	282.1	2,883.3
Source: HKO IMD

== Demography ==
In 1901, town population was 6,198 under the Maratha Empire. Population rose to 25,529 in 1991, 47,304 in 2001, 1,05,726 in 2011 and 1,25,068 in 2019.

== Civic administration ==
For the convenience of urban administrative work, the municipality has been divided into 24 wards - Gandhi Ward, Rajendra Babu Ward, Indira Ward, Azad Ward, Maharana Pratap Ward, Kamath Ward, Bhama Ward, Hanuman Ward, Rani Laxmibai Ward, Subhash Ward, Shaheed Bhagat Singh Ward, Mata Ward, Chawri Ward, Radha Ballabh Ward, Rajeev Ward, Jawahar Ward, Jagdish Ward, Vivekananda Ward, Niranjan Ward, Shivaji Ward, Shastri Ward, Patel Ward, Narsingh Ward.

== Economy ==
The economy of Gadarwara is mainly based on agriculture. There is adequate irrigation facility available here from the water of rivers like Narmada and Shakkar. The soil here is fertile in which mainly sugarcane, pigeon pea and wheat crops are grown.

The main industries here are dal, rice, and sugar milling. There is also a thermal plant near Gadarwara which is operated by the NTPC.

== Notable people ==
- Mohit Daga, Indian Actor
- Ashutosh Rana, Indian Actor
- Rameshwar Neekhra, Indian Politician
- Osho Rajneesh, Indian Philosopher

== Transportation ==
Gadarwara railway station connected from major city of India, Many trains stop on the Station. It's Situated on Jabalpur Bhusawal section.

Gadarwara is well connected with neighboring major Cities like Jabalpur, Narsinghpur, Pipariya, Hoshangabad, Itarsi, Bareli and Sagar by roads, Gadarwara is connected by private bus services to all nearest major cities.

== See also ==
- Damaru Ghati
- Sainkheda
- Salichauka babai
