= Narsinghpur district =

Coordinates: 22°55′N 79°10′E

- District of Madhya Pradesh
- नरसिंहपुर
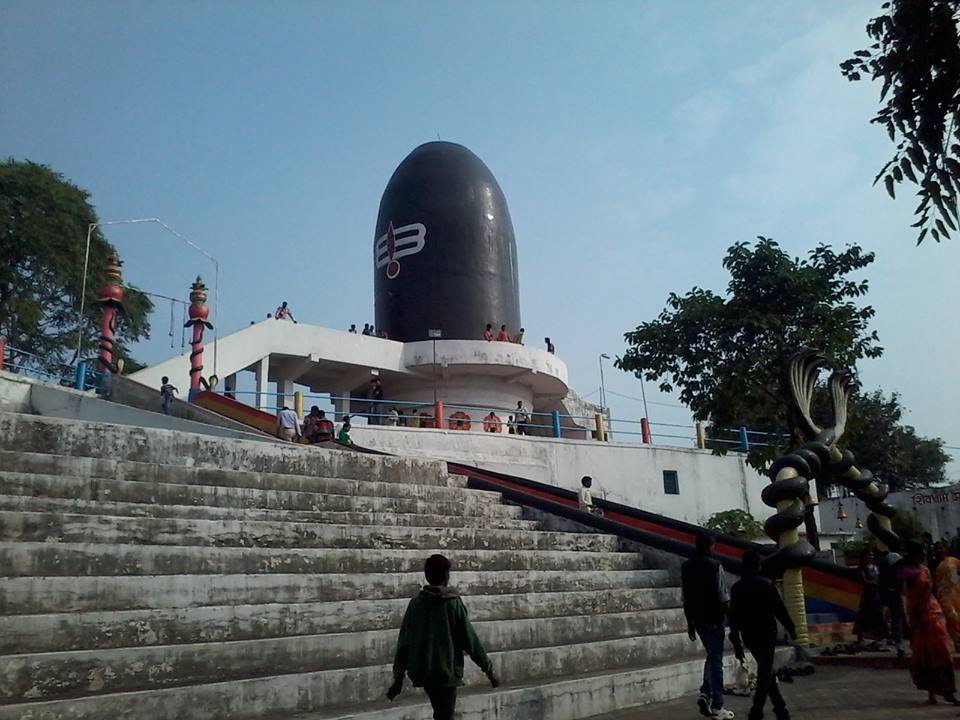
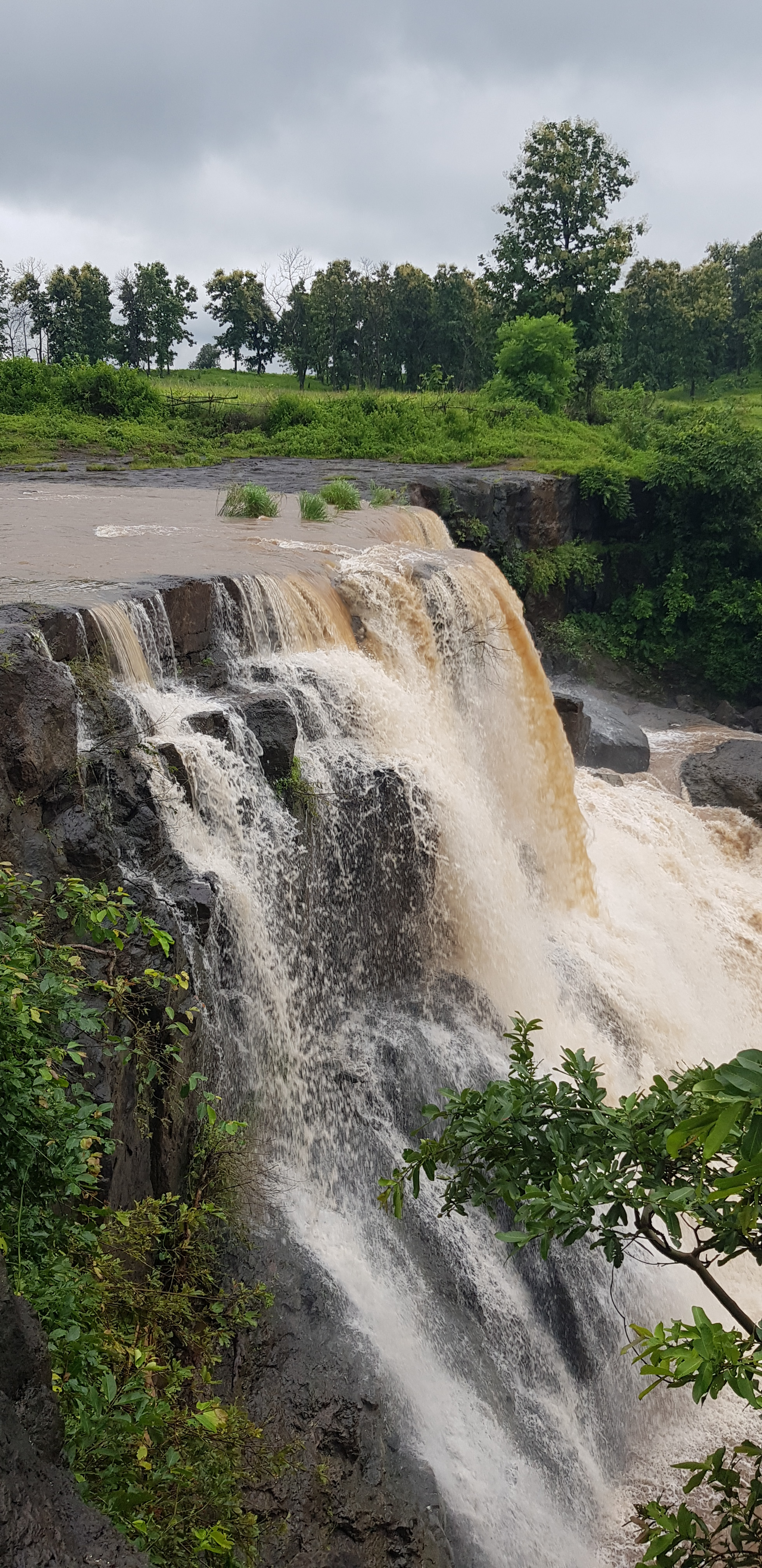
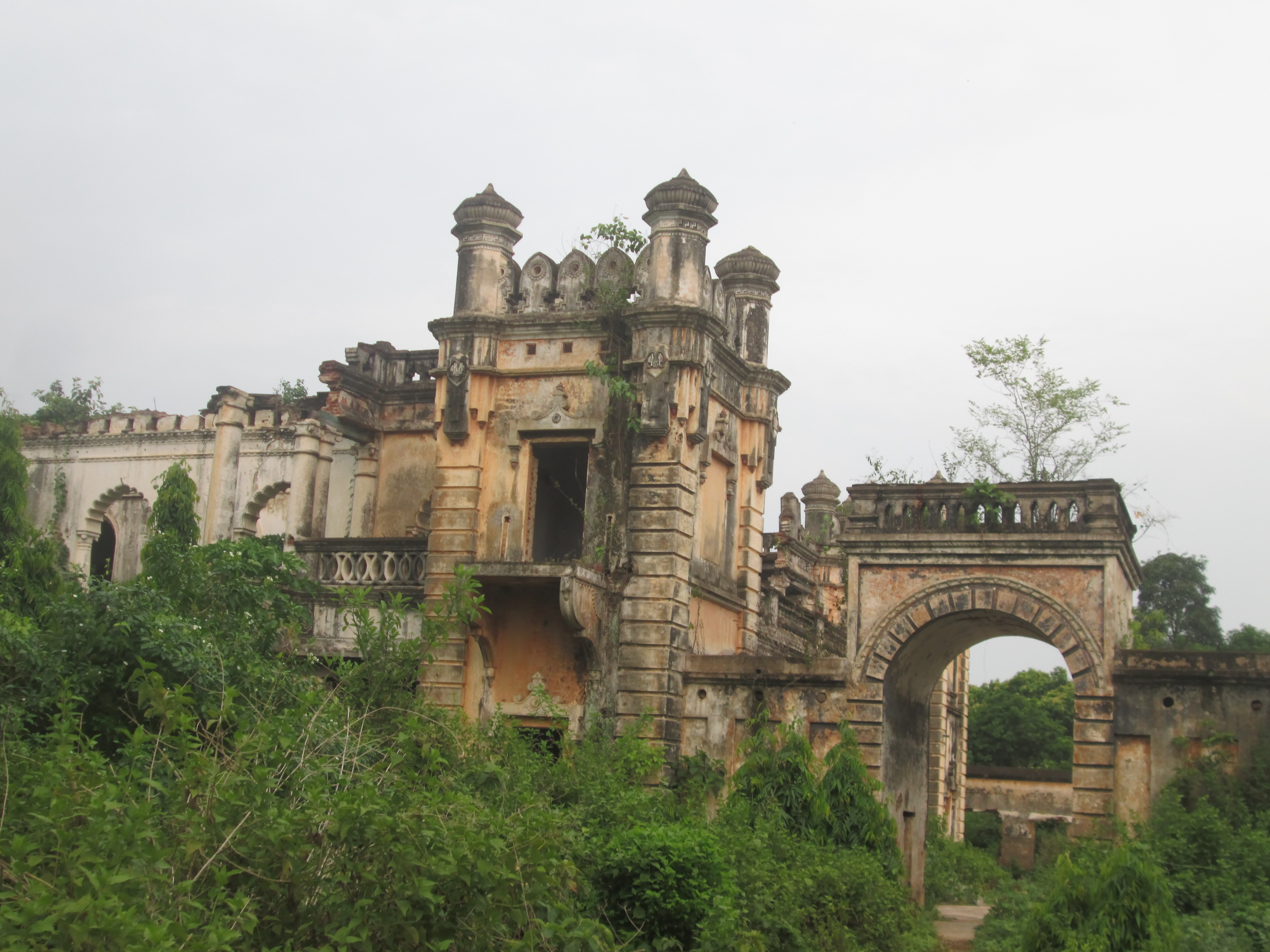
- Damru Ghati, Usri Water fall, Chauragarh Fort

- Location of Narsinghpur district in Madhya Pradesh
- Country: India
- State: Madhya Pradesh
- Division: Jabalpur
- Headquarters: Narsinghpur

Government
  - Collector: Shrimati.Rajani Singh IAS
  - Lok Sabha constituencies: Hoshangabad
  - SP: Mr. Vipul Srivastava IPS

Area
  - Total: 5,125.55 km^{2} (1,978.99 sq mi)

Population (2011)
  - Total: 1,091,854
  - Density: 213.022/km^{2} (551.724/sq mi)

Demographics
  - Literacy: 76.79%
  - Sex ratio: 917
- Time zone: UTC+05:30 (IST)
- Website: narsinghpur.nic.in

Narsinghpur district (Hindi pronunciation: [nəɾsɪŋgʱpʊɾ]; also referred to Narsimhapur district) is a district of Madhya Pradesh state in central India. Vindhyachal is on its northern border and the Satpura range extends along its entire length on the southern border. In the northern part, the Narmada river flows from east to west. Latitude 22º.45N 23º.15N, Longitude 78º.38E 79º.38E, Area 5125.55 Square Kilometers, 359.8 meters above sea level. The city of Narsinghpur is administrative headquarters of the district. As of 2001 Narsinghpur is the most literate district of MP.

== History ==
Narsinghpur district is located almost in the central part of the state of Madhya Pradesh. The position of state of Madhya Pradesh is also in the central part of the country, that is why it is named Madhya Pradesh, that is, the state of the central part. The position of Narsinghpur district is considered unique according to the equation that it is located in the middle of both the country and the state. Narsinghpur district also attracts attention due to its special natural condition. Vindhyachal is on its northern border and the Satpura range extends along its entire length on the southern border. In the northern part, the Narmada River flows from east to west. Which is considered sacred like the river Ganga. Narsinghpur district has got many natural gifts in the form of the alluvium of Narmada. In the past, this area has been under the rule of historical heroine Durgavati after being under many dynasties. In that period it is mentioned by other names. In the 18th century, the Jat Sardars built a grand temple here and installed the idol of Lord Narasimha. Since then it became the headquarters of the district and this village named Gadariya Kheda became famous as "Narsinghpur".

=== Historical background ===
Narsinghpur district area has hidden the oldest proofs of its existence within itself. Which have been exposed from time to time by various archaeological discoveries. According to the archaeological evidence mentioned in the District Gazetteer, stone age fossil animals and tools made of sandstone have been found in 1872 in a village named Bhatra, away from Gadarwara in the district. In other search campaigns, prehistoric remains have been found in places like Devakchhar, Dhuvghat, Kumhari, Ratikarar, and Brahman Ghat. Marked rocky and carved rock caves near Bijauri village also link the existence of the district to ancient times. The remains of mammalian fossils and archaeological tools found in the exploration campaigns on the banks of Narmada between Bramhan Ghat to Jhansi Ghat connect the district with prehistoric history.

According to legends, this area has been related to the events of the Ramayana and Mahabharata period. According to mythological references, Brahman Ghat is the place where Brahma, the creator of the universe, performed a yajna on the banks of the holy Narmada. The ancient name of Bilthari village of Chanwarpatha development block is called “Bali Sthali”. It is considered to be the abode of King Bali.

In the Puranas, the attempt of the Pandavas to tie the river Narmada in a single night on the Satdhara of Barman Ghat in the Mahabharata period has been mentioned. Bhim Kund, Arjun Kund, etc. near Satdhara indicate this. It is said that the Pandavas spent some period of their exile here. The cave of Sankal Ghat is associated with the study and meditation of Gurudev of Adi Guru Shankaracharya.

Barhata village of the district is considered to be the remains of Virat Nagar of the Mahabharata period. This legend is strengthened by the stone sculptures and artistic remains found here at every step. The human-shaped rock lying near Bachai is associated with “Kichak”. The Bohani region of the district is considered to be the stronghold of Prithviraj's heroic heroes Alha-Udal's father Jasraj and uncle Bachraj. There is an abundance of facts and imitations connecting the reference of the district to ancient times from the ancient objects and mentions found in the excavation of many historical evidences. But through history books and historical records, the series of authentic history of the district meets the history of the second century.

=== Satavahana period ===
In the 2nd century, this area was dominated by the Satavahana rulers. It remained under the Gupta Empire in the 4th century when Samudra Gupta succeeded in establishing the boundaries of his empire in the Central India region and up to the south. There are some indications of Pedirajya in the sixth century. But the period of about 300 years is again lost in darkness. There is mention of the establishment of the Kshetra Kalchuri rule (Haihay) in the ninth century. The capital of the Kalchuri dynasty was Mahishmati city on the banks of Narmada, which later became established in Tripuri. The details of the spread of Kalchuri state from Gomti to Narmada Ghat are preserved in the history books. After the decline of the Kalchuri power, there is mention of the patronage of Alha-Udal's father and uncle in this area. After those who made Bohani their royal center, this area remained a part of the Rajgaud dynasty's empire for four centuries.

=== Rajgaud dynasty ===
With the establishment of this administration, a new orderly, peaceful, and prosperous period begins in the district. The credit for the rise of this dynasty is given to Yadav Rao (Yadurao). Who established Garha in Katanga in the last years of the fourteenth century and laid the foundation of an important governance order. Sangram Shah (1400-1541), the famous ruler of this dynasty, strengthened his empire by establishing 52 forts. He also built the Chauragarh (Chaugan) fort in Narsinghpur district, which is a silent witness to the valor of Veeranarayan, the son of Queen Durgavati. Among the successors of Sangram Shah, Dalpati Shah ruled peacefully for seven years. After that, his heroic queen Durgavati took over the kingdom and ruled for 16 years (1540-1564) with indomitable courage and bravery. In 1564, while fighting Akbar's warlord Ataf Khan, the queen died; Chauragarh situated in Narsinghpur district was in the form of a strong hill fort where Ataf Khan surrounded Prince Virnarayan and finally killed him by devious moves. Gadha Katanga state was captured by the Mughals in 1564. Gonds, Mughals, and after them, this area remained divided between administrative and military officers and hereditary chieftains during the rule of Marathas. According to whose influence and power the boundaries of the areas used to change from time to time. Chanwarpatha, Barha, Santhdyarkheda, Shahpur, Singhpur, Srinagar, and Tendukheda of the district were famous as the headquarters of the Parganas throughout this period.

=== Bhonsle Ruler ===
In 1785, Madhoji Bhosle acquired Mandla and Narmada Valley for 27 lakh rupees, which kept sinking under the tussle of Radhoji Bhosle/Bhopal Nawab/Pindori chieftains, etc., and the brutal pressure of military rule. It can be called a cauldron of crisis and instability. In which there was tremendous exploitation of the people of the area along with looting. Finally came under British rule in 1817.

=== Independence movement ===
Despite being under the harsh clutches of British rule, the yearning for freedom always kept burning in the minds of the people in the district. In 1857, the rebel fighters captured the Chanwarpatha and Tendukheda police stations. Under the leadership of Gaur chief Delon Shah of Madanpur, there was a conch shell for independence. In 1858, Delan Shah was captured and hanged. By crushing the first freedom struggle of 1857, the British emperor continued to establish its roots.

=== Congress movement ===
After the establishment of the Indian National Congress in 1885, the spark of the movement for independence in the district has always been lit – Lokmanya Tilak, Mahatma Gandhi, Pt. Jawaharlal Nehru, Subhash Chandra Vose Prabhuti led the movement for independence in the district under the inspiration and leadership The atmosphere was full of enthusiasm. A large number of agitators from the district remained active under the leadership of Gayadat, Manikchand Kochar, Chaudhary Shankar Lal, Thakur Niranjan Singh, Shyam Sunder Narayan Mushran, etc. among the leaders of the district. In order to destroy this unity and enthusiasm, the British government again divided the district in 1932 and merged it with the Hoshangabad district. But this did not bring any relaxation in the enthusiasm of the movement and Satyagraha. In 1942, Mansharam and Gauradevi were martyred in the firing on the Satyagrahi procession in Chichi. Hundreds of agitators tolerated the cycle of repression with a smile and established a unique tradition of sacrifice and sacrifice against British rule.

== Geography ==
The district has an area 5,125.55 km^{2}. The district is part of the Jabalpur Division. It is bounded on the north by Sagar and Damoh districts, on the east by Jabalpur District, on the southeast by Seoni District, on the south by Chhindwara District, on the west by Hoshangabad District, and on the northwest by Raisen District. The administrative seat is Narsinghpur.

The district sits in the basin of the Narmada River. The Vindhya Range skirts the northern end of the district. The Satpura Range forms the district's southern boundary. It is located between 22°55' and 23°15' north latitude, and 78°38' and 79°38' east longitudes. It has an average elevation of 359.8 m above mean sea level. Narmada is the Main river in Narsinghpur district. Shakkar River, Dudhi River and Sher River are other river flows in district.

== Tehsils ==
1. Kareli
2. Gadarwara
3. Sainkheda
4. Gotegaon
5. Narsinghpur
6. Tendukheda

== Demographics ==
Historical population
Year	Pop.	±% p.a.
1901	315,518	—
1911	325,677	+0.32%
1921	315,162	−0.33%
1931	321,481	+0.20%
1941	334,991	+0.41%
1951	339,110	+0.12%
1961	412,406	+1.98%
1971	519,270	+2.33%
1981	650,445	+2.28%
1991	785,496	+1.90%
2001	957,646	+2.00%
2011	2,099,900	+8.17%

Religions in Narsinghpur district (2011)
Religion	Percent
Hinduism	95.13%
Islam	3.58%
Jainism	0.74%
Other or not stated	0.55%

According to the 2011 census Narsinghpur District has a population of 1,091,854, roughly equal to the nation of Cyprus or the US state of Rhode Island. This gives it a ranking of 418th in India (out of a total of 640). The district has a population density of 213 inhabitants per square kilometre (550/sq mi). Its population growth rate over the decade 2001-2011 was 14.04%. Narsimhapur has a sex ratio of 917 females for every 1000 males, and a literacy rate of 76.79%. 18.64% of the population lives in urban areas. Scheduled Castes and Tribes make up 16.87% and 13.36% of the population respectively.

Hindi is the predominant language, spoken by 99.06% of the population.

== Transport ==
The main rail line from Mumbai- Prayagraj- Howrah, which follows the Narmada River valley, runs through the district from west to east.

There is a bus stand located near the station. Previously it was at the city center. The town is around the National Highway - 26.

== Tourist Attractions ==
- Narsingh Temple
- Dada Maharaj Temple
- Barman Narmada Ghat
- Damru Ghati, Gadarwara
- Dhuni Wale Dada Tample, Gadarwara
- Jhoteshawar Param Hans Aashram
- Osho Ashram Gadarwara
- Chaugan Fort, Gadarwara

== Notable personalities ==
- Maharshi Mahesh Yogi
- Shyam Sundar Rawat
- Ashutosh Rana
- Bhawani Prasad Mishra
- S H Raza
- Mohit Daga
- Chandra Mohan (Hindi actor)

== See also ==
- Bagaspur
