= Biosphere reserves of India =

There are 18 biosphere reserves in India. They protect larger areas of natural habitat than a typical national park or animal sanctuary, and often include one or more national parks or reserves, along with buffer zones that are open to some economic uses. Protection is granted not only to the flora and fauna of the protected region, but also to the human communities who inhabit these regions, and their ways of life. In total there are 18 biosphere reserves in India.

== World network ==
Thirteen of the eighteen biosphere reserves are a part of the World Network of Biosphere Reserves, based on the UNESCO Man and the Biosphere (MAB) Programme list.

#	Name	States/ UT	Year
1	Nilgiri Biosphere Reserve	Tamil Nadu, Kerala and Karnataka	2000
2	Gulf of Mannar Biosphere Reserve	Tamil Nadu	2001
3	Sundarbans Biosphere Reserve	West Bengal	2001
4	Nanda Devi Biosphere Reserve	Uttarakhand	2004
5	Nokrek Biosphere Reserve	Meghalaya	2009
6	Pachmarhi Biosphere Reserve	Madhya Pradesh	2009
7	Simlipal Biosphere Reserve	Odisha	2009
8	Achanakmar-Amarkantak Biosphere Reserve	Chhattisgarh and Madhya Pradesh	2012
9	Great Nicobar Biosphere Reserve	Andaman & Nicobar Islands	2013
10	Agasthyamalai Biosphere Reserve	Kerala and Tamil Nadu	2016
11	Khangchendzonga National Park	Sikkim	2018
12	Panna Biosphere Reserve	Madhya Pradesh	2020
13	Cold Desert	Himachal Pradesh	2025

== List of biosphere reserves in India ==
Biosphere reserves of India
	Year	Name	Location	State/UT	Type	Key fauna	Area (km^{2})
1	1986	Nilgiri Biosphere Reserve	Part of Waynad, Nagarhole, Bandipur and Mudumalai, Mukurthi, Sathyamangalam, Nilambur, Silent Valley	Karnataka, Tamil Nadu and Kerala	Western Ghats	Nilgiri tahr, tiger, Asian elephant lion-tailed macaque	5520
2	1988	Nanda Devi Biosphere Reserve	Parts of Chamoli District, Pithoragarh District & Bageshwar District	Uttarakhand	Western Himalayas	Snow leopard, Himalayan black bear	5860
3	1988	Nokrek	In West Garo Hills	Meghalaya	Eastern hills	Red panda	820.00
4	1989	Gulf of Mannar Biosphere Reserve	Indian part of Gulf of Mannar extending from Rameswaram island in the north to Kanyakumari in the south of Tamil Nadu and Sri Lanka	Tamil Nadu	Coasts	Dugong	10500
5	1989	Sundarbans	Part of delta of Ganges and Brahmaputra river system	West Bengal	Gangetic Delta	Royal Bengal tiger	9630
6	1989	Manas	Part of Kokrajhar, Bongaigaon, Barpeta, Nalbari, Kamrup and Darrang Districts	Assam	Eastern Hills	Asiatic elephant, tiger, Assam roofed turtle, hispid hare, golden langur, pygmy hog	2837
7	1989	Great Nicobar Biosphere Reserve	Southernmost of the Andaman and Nicobar Islands	Andaman and Nicobar Islands	Islands	Saltwater crocodile	885
8	1994	Simlipal	Part of Mayurbhanj district	Odisha	Deccan Peninsula	Gaur, royal Bengal tiger, Asian elephant	4374
9	1997	Dibru-Saikhowa	Part of Dibrugarh and Tinsukia districts	Assam	Eastern Hills	White-winged wood duck, water buffalo, black-breasted parrotbill, tiger, capped langur	765
10	1998	Dihang-Dibang	Part of Siang and Dibang Valley	Arunachal Pradesh	Eastern Himalaya	Mishmi takin, musk deer	5112
11	1999	Pachmarhi Biosphere Reserve	Parts of Betul District, Hoshangabad District and Chhindwara District	Madhya Pradesh	Semi-Arid	Giant squirrel, flying squirrel	4981.72
12	2000	Khangchendzonga National Park	Parts of Kangchenjunga	Sikkim	Eastern Himalayas	Snow leopard, red panda	2620
13	2001	Agasthyamalai Biosphere Reserve	Neyyar, Peppara and Shenduruny Wildlife Sanctuary, Kalakkad Mundanthurai Tiger Reserve and their adjoining areas	Kerala and Tamil Nadu	Western Ghats	Nilgiri tahr, Bengal tiger, Asian elephant	3500.08
14	2005	Achanakmar-Amarkantak Biosphere Reserve	Part of Annupur, Dindori and Bilaspur districts	Madhya Pradesh and Chhattisgarh	Maikal Hills	Four-horned antelope, Indian wild dog, sarus crane, white-rumped vulture, sacred grove bush frog	3835.51
15	2008	Great Rann of Kutch	Part of Kutch, Morbi, Surendranagar and Patan districts; the largest biosphere reserve in India.	Gujarat	Desert	Indian wild ass	12454
16	2009	Cold Desert	Pin Valley National Park and surroundings; Chandratal and Sarchu & Kibber Wildlife Sanctuary	Himachal Pradesh	Western Himalayas	Snow leopard	7770
17	2010	Seshachalam Hills biosphere	Seshachalam Hill Ranges covering parts of Chittoor and Kadapa districts	Andhra Pradesh	Eastern Ghats	Slender loris	4755.997
18	2011	Panna	Part of Panna and Chhattarpur districts in Madhya Pradesh	Madhya Pradesh	Moist deciduous forest	Bengal tiger, Chinkara, Nilgai, sambar deer, and Sloth bear	2998.98

== Key fauna ==
Name	Key Fauna
Nilgiri Biosphere Reserve	Lion Tailed Macaque (EN), Nilgiri Tahr (EN), Malabar Giant Squirrel (LC), Nilgiri Langur (VU)
Nanda Devi	Snow Leopard (VU), Musk Deer (EN), Bharal Or Blue Sheep (LC)
Nokrek	Red Panda (EN), Hoolock Gibbons (EN), Red Giant Flying Squirrel (LC)
Great Nicobar	Dugong (VU), Saltwater Crocodile (LC)
Gulf of Mannar	Dugong (VU), Olive Ridley turtles (VU)
Manas	Assam Roofed Turtle (EN), Hispid Hare (EN), Golden Langur (EN), Pygmy Hog (EN), Wild Water Buffalo (EN), Bengal florican (CR)
Sunderbans	Royal Bengal Tiger (EN)
Simlipal	Royal Bengal Tigers, Wild Elephants (EN), Gaurs (VU – Indian Bison), Chausingha (VU)
Dibru-Saikhowa	Bengal Tiger, Clouded Leopard (VU), Gangetic Dolphin (EN)
Dehang-Debang	Takin (VU), Red Panda (EN)
Pachmarhi	Tiger, Gaur, Indian Giant Flying Squirrels (LC)
Khangchendzonga	Red Panda (EN), Snow Leopard (VU), Musk Deer (EN), Great Tibetan Sheep (Argali – NT)
Agasthyamalai	Nilgiri Tahr (EN)
Achanakamar - Amarkantak	Four Horned Antelope (Chausingha (VU)), Indian Wild Dog (VU)
Great Rann of Kutch (Kachchh)	Great Indian Bustard (CR), Indian Wild Ass (NT)
Cold Desert	Snow Leopard (VU), Himalayan Ibex (also referred to as Siberian Ibex – LC)
Seshachalam Hills	Red Sanders (NT), Golden Gecko (LC – Endemic To Tirumala Hills)
Panna	Tiger (EN), Chital (LC), Chinkara (LC), Sambar (VU)

== Potential sites ==
The following is a list of potential sites for Biosphere Reserves as selected by Ministry of Forests and Environment:

- Abujmarh, Chhattisgarh
- Andaman and Nicobar, North Islands
- Chintapalli, Visakhapatnam Andhra Pradesh
- Kanha, Madhya Pradesh
- Kovalam, Kerala
- Lakshadweep Islands, Lakshadweep
- Little Rann of Kutch, Gujarat
- Phawngpui (Blue Mountain), Mizoram
- Namdapha, Arunachal Pradesh
- Singhbhum, Jharkhand
- Tawang and West Kameng, Arunachal Pradesh
- Thar Desert, Rajasthan
- Tadoba National Park and Sanjay Gandhi National Park,

Maharashtra

- Bhitarkanika,Kendrapara,Odisha

== See also ==
- Bodhi Tree
- List of Banyan trees in India
- List of national parks of India
- Sacred groves of India
- Sacred trees
- Wildlife sanctuaries of India
