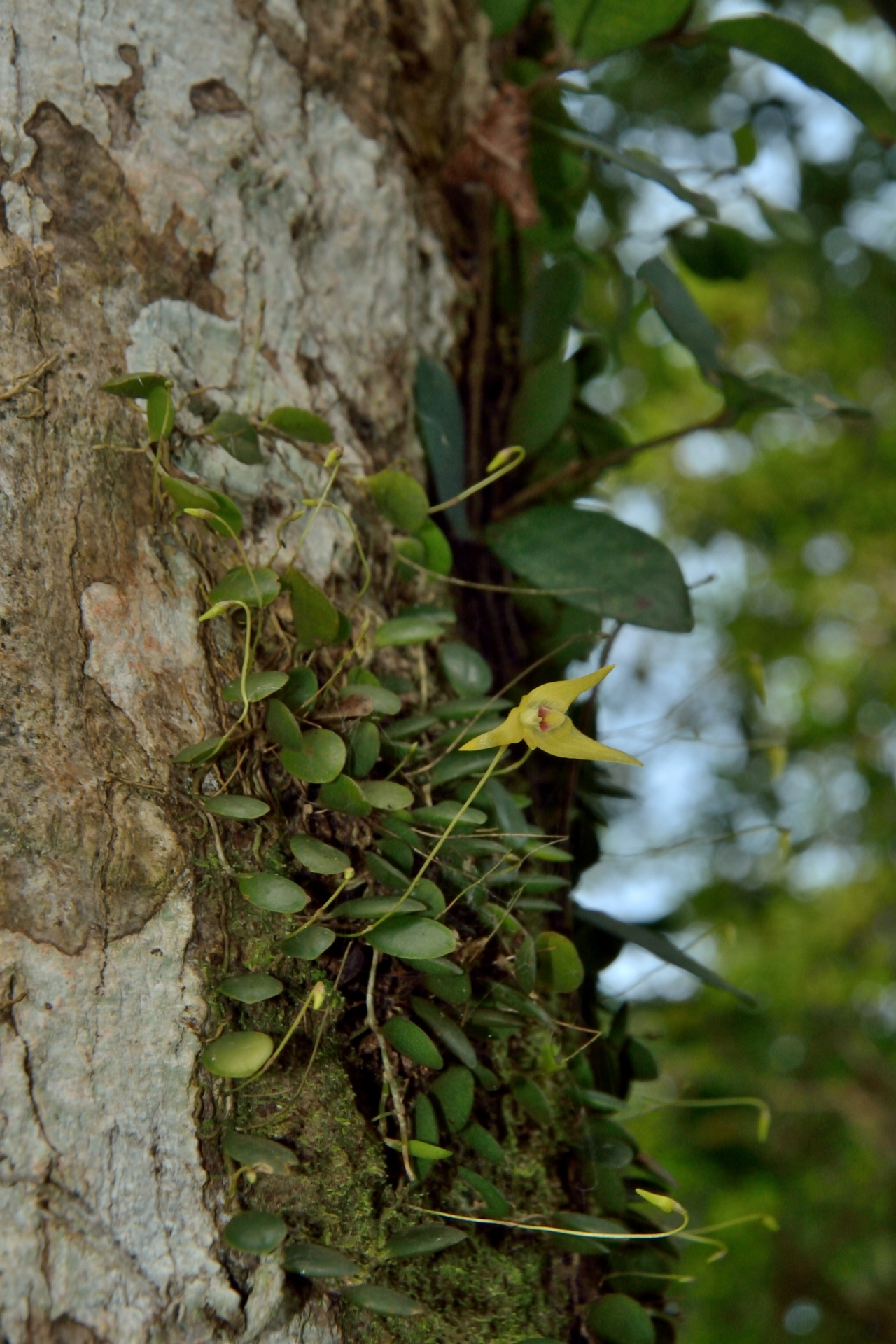
- Bulbophyllum drymoglossum

Scientific classification
- Kingdom: Plantae
- Clade: Tracheophytes
- Clade: Angiosperms
- Clade: Monocots
- Order: Asparagales
- Family: Orchidaceae
- Subfamily: Epidendroideae
- Genus: Bulbophyllum
- Section: Bulbophyllum sect. Aeschynanthoides; Carr 1930

Type species
- Bulbophyllum dryas Ridl. 1915

Species
- See text

= Bulbophyllum sect. Aeschynanthoides =

Section of flowering plants

Bulbophyllum sect. Aeschynanthoides is a section of the genus Bulbophyllum.

== Description ==
Species in this section have small pseudobulbs with the rhizome being thicker than the pseudobulbs

== Distribution ==
Plants from this section are found from China to Southeast Asia.

== Species ==
Bulbophyllum section Aeschynanthoides comprises the following species:

Image	Name	Distribution	Elevation (m)
	Bulbophyllum curranii Ames 1912	Philippines	3,000 metres (9,800 ft)
	Bulbophyllum dryas Ridl. 1915	Peninsular Malaysia, Borneo and Sumatra	1,300–2,200 metres (4,300–7,200 ft)
	Bulbophyllum drymoglossum Maxim. 1887	China and Taiwan	300–2,000 metres (980–6,560 ft)
	Bulbophyllum hainanense Z.H.Tsi 1981	China	500 metres (1,600 ft)
	Bulbophyllum hymenanthum Hook.f. 1890	Eastern Himalayas, Assam, Thailand, Vietnam and Borneo	1,300–2,600 metres (4,300–8,500 ft)
	Bulbophyllum stellulamontis J.J.Verm. & A.L.Lamb 2013	Sarawak, Brunei and Sabah Borneo	
