= Pachmarhi Biosphere Reserve =

Biosphere reserve in India, designated in 2009

Coordinates: 22.47°N 78.41°E

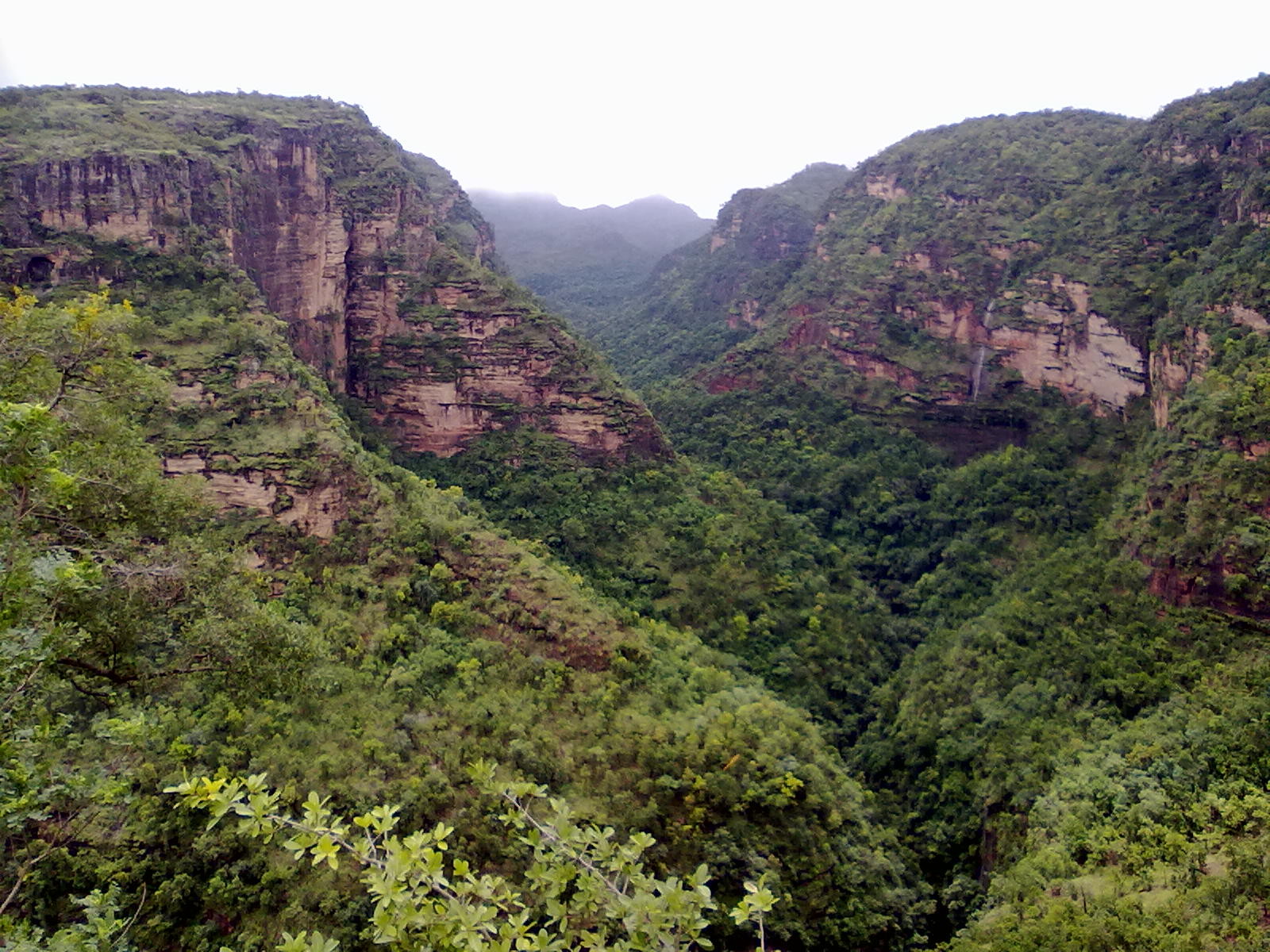
Pachmarhi Valley, in Pachmarhi Biosphere Reserve.

The Pachmarhi Biosphere Reserve is a non-use conservation area and as a biosphere reserve in the Satpura Range of Madhya Pradesh state in Central India.

The conservation area was created in 1999 by the Indian government. It also contains animals from the Himalayan mountains and from the lower Western Ghats. UNESCO designated it a biosphere reserve in 2009.

== Geography ==
The Pachmarhi Biosphere Reserve is located within areas of Narmadapuram, Betul, and Chhindwara Districts in Madhya Pradesh.

Satpura National Park is designated as the core zone and the remaining area of 4401.91 km^{2}, including the Bori and Pachmarhi sanctuaries, serves as the buffer zone.

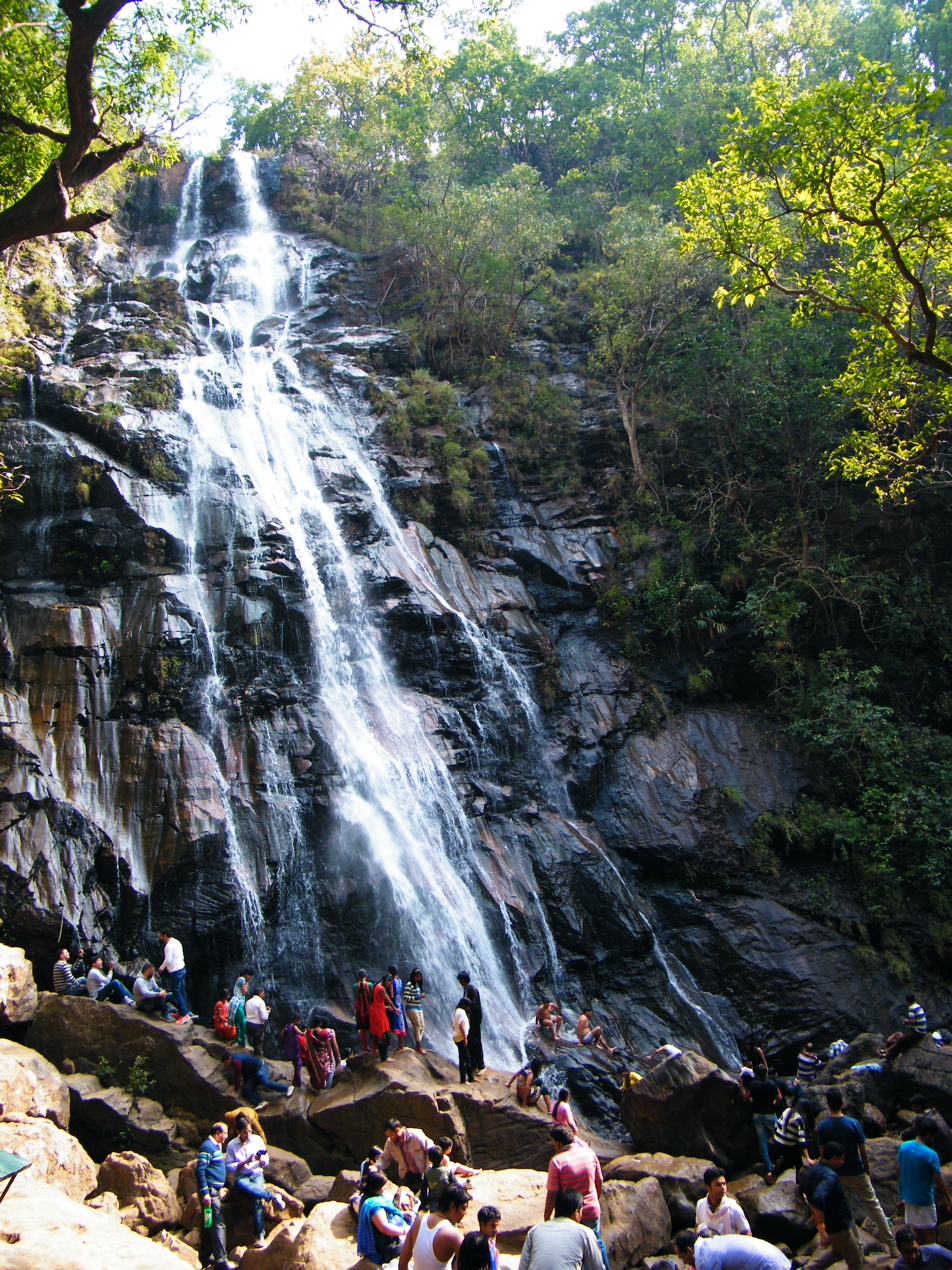
A waterfall in Pachmarhi Biosphere Reserve

== Ecology ==
The reserve is composed primarily of forest habitats, and is a critical transition zone between the forest species of western and eastern India.

=== Flora ===
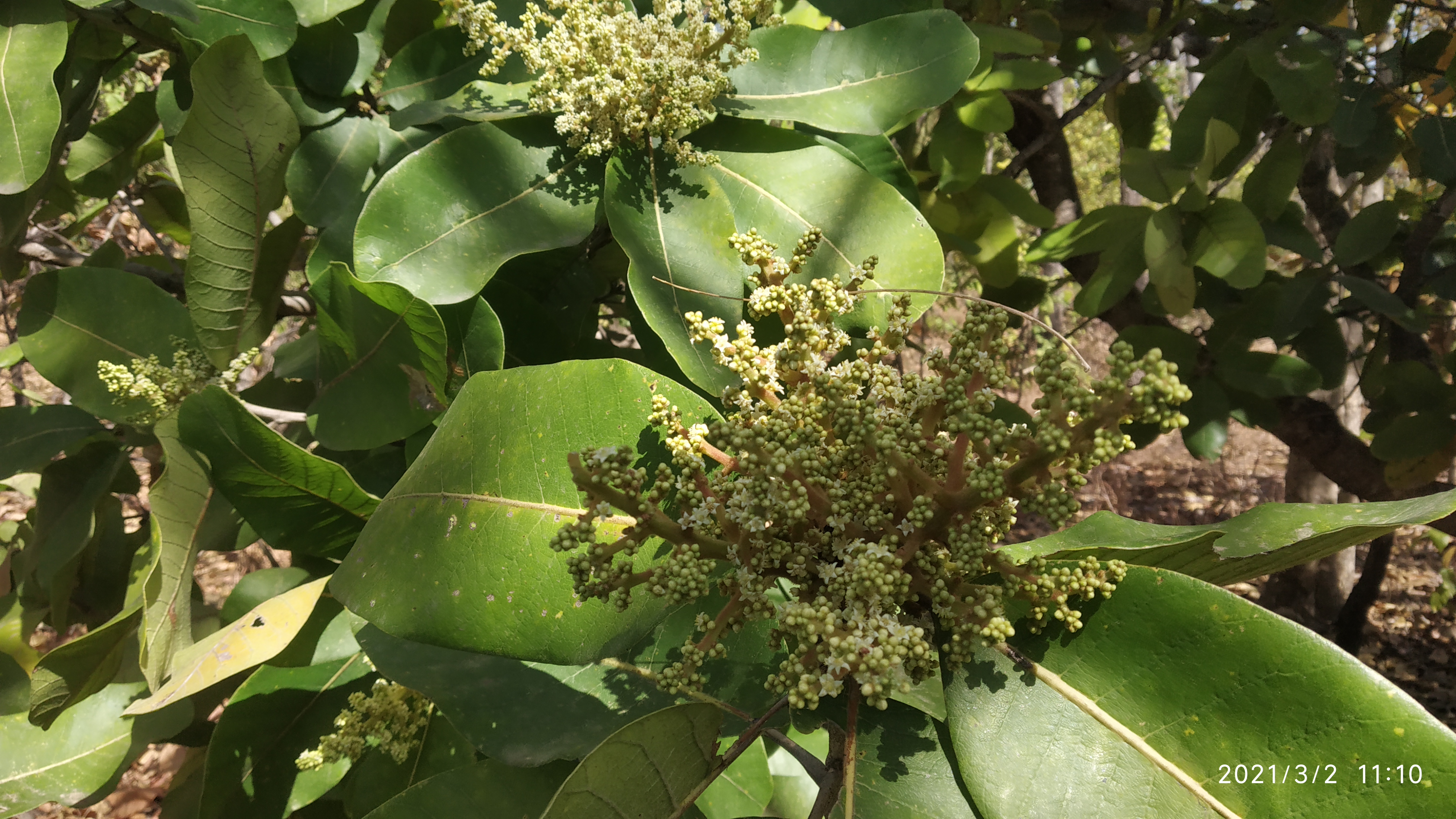
Flowering twigs of Chironji (Buchanania lanzan) at Pachmarchi hill

The forests are dominated by teak (Tectona grandis). They include the westernmost groves of sal (Shorea robusta), which is the dominant tree of eastern India's forests. Other endemic vegetation includes wild mango, silver fern, jamun and arjun. The Cuddapah almond trees are abundantly found over the hills of Pachmarchi.

Fourteen ethno-botanical plant species that occur in PBR have been studied, which are traded from the selected villages of the buffer zone area of PBR. Different plant parts of these important species are collected by the local people for their own consumption and trade. A part of the reserve vegetation has been studied by Prof. Chandra Prakash Kala, especially with respect to the indigenous uses of the plants.

=== Fauna ===
Large mammal species include tigers, leopard, wild bear, gaur (Bos gaurus), chital deer (Axis axis), muntjac deer, sambar deer (Cervus multicolor), and rhesus macaque live in the Pachmarhi Biosphere Reserve.

The endemic fauna includes chinkara, nilgai, Asian wild dogs, the Indian wolf, gaur, Indian giant squirrels, and flying squirrels.

== See also ==
- Biosphere reserves of India
- Wildlife sanctuaries in Madhya Pradesh
- Indian Council of Forestry Research and Education
