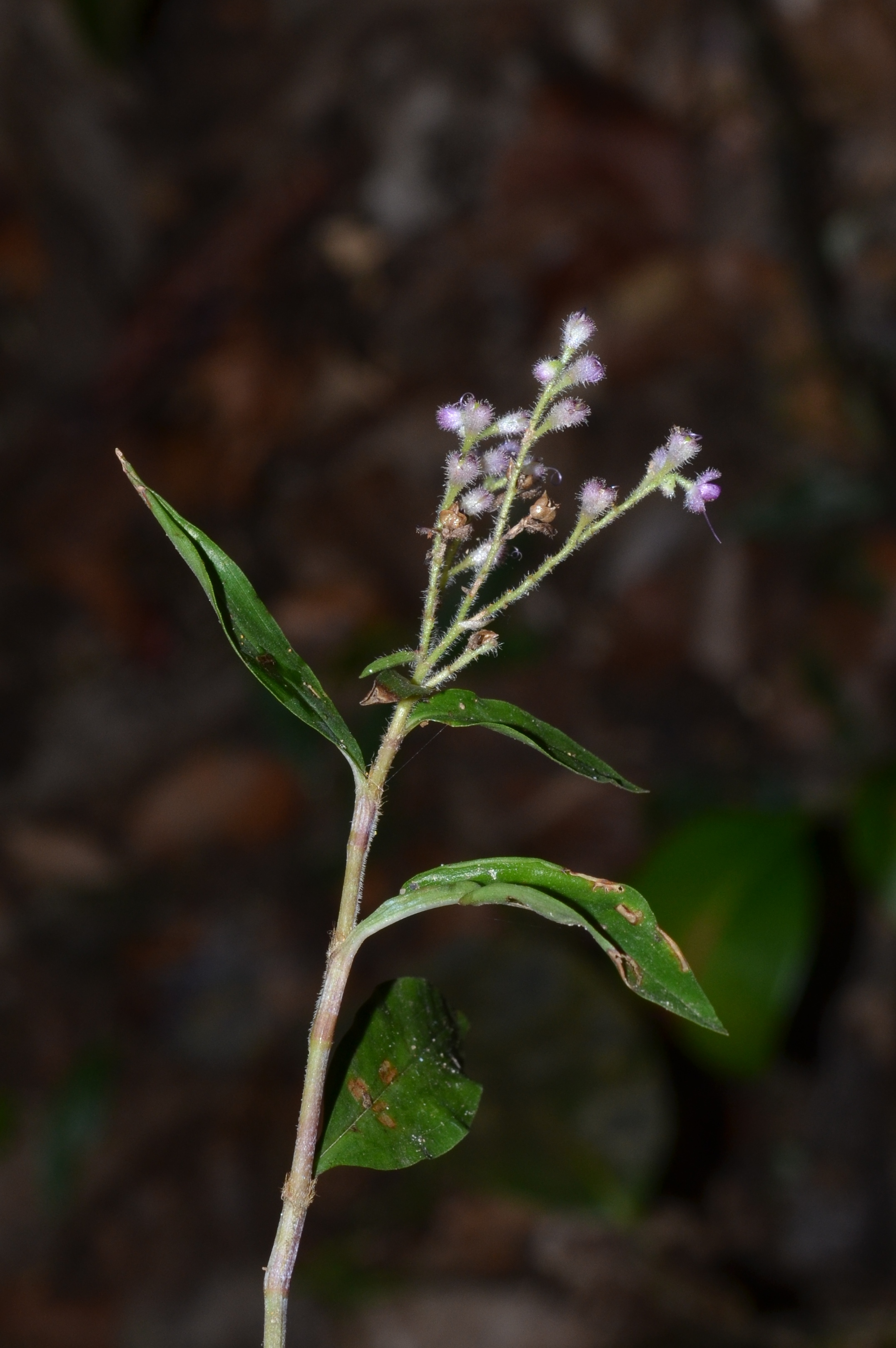

Conservation status
- Least Concern (IUCN 3.1)

Scientific classification
- Kingdom: Plantae
- Clade: Embryophytes
- Clade: Tracheophytes
- Clade: Spermatophytes
- Clade: Angiosperms
- Clade: Monocots
- Clade: Commelinids
- Order: Commelinales
- Family: Commelinaceae
- Genus: Floscopa
- Species: F. scandens

Binomial name
- Floscopa scandens Lour.

Synonyms
- List: Aneilema asperum Buch.-Ham. ex Wall.; Aneilema cymosum (Blume) Kunth; Aneilema densiflorum (Blume) Kunth; Aneilema hispidum D.Don; Commelina cymosa Blume; Commelina densiflora Blume; Commelina hamiltonii Spreng.; Commelina hispida (D.Don) Ham. ex Spreng.; Dithyrocarpus meyenianus Kunth; Dithyrocarpus paniculatus (Roxb.) Kunth; Dithyrocarpus petiolatus Wight; Dithyrocarpus rothii Wight; Dithyrocarpus rufus (C.Presl) Kunth; Dithyrocarpus undulatus Wight; Floscopa hamiltonii (Spreng.) Hassk.; Floscopa meyeniana (Kunth) Hassk.; Floscopa paniculata (Roxb.) Hassk.; Floscopa petiolata (Wight) Hassk.; Floscopa rufa (C.Presl) Hassk.; Floscopa scandens var. vaginivillosa R.H.Miau; Floscopa undulata (Wight) Hassk.; Lamprodithyros paniculatus (Roxb.) Hassk.; Tradescantia geniculata Blanco; Tradescantia paniculata Roxb.; Tradescantia paniculata B.Heyne ex Roth; Tradescantia rufa C.Presl

= Floscopa scandens =

Species of plant

Floscopa scandens is a species of flowering plant in the family Commelinaceae. It is sometimes referred to by the common name climbing flower cup. It is a subscandent herb native to the Andaman Islands, Assam, Bangladesh, Borneo, Cambodia, China, East Himalaya, India, Java, Laos, Malaysia, Myanmar, Nepal, the Nicobar Islands, the Philippines, Queensland (Australia), Sri Lanka, Taiwan, Thailand, Tibet, and Vietnam.

In Western Ghats it is commonly found near streams and marshy localities in the forests of Western Ghats.
