= Lalldhwojia =

Scientific classification
- Kingdom: Plantae
- Clade: Tracheophytes
- Clade: Angiosperms
- Clade: Eudicots
- Clade: Asterids
- Order: Apiales
- Family: Apiaceae
- Subfamily: Apioideae
- Tribe: Tordylieae
- Subtribe: Tordyliinae
- Genus: Lalldhwojia; Farille

Genus of plants

Lalldhwojia is a genus of flowering plants belonging to the family Apiaceae. It is also within the tribe Tordylieae and subtribe Tordyliinae.

It is native to the Himalayas mainly the regions of East Himalayas and Nepal.

The genus name of Lalldhwojia is in honour of Lall Dhwoj (fl. 1927–1930), plant collector. It was first described and published in Rev. Gén. Bot. Vol.91 on page 27 in 1984.

== Known species ==
According to Kew:

- Lalldhwojia acronemifolia (H.Wolff) M.F.Watson ex D.G.Long
- Lalldhwojia cooperi Farille
- Lalldhwojia pastinacifolia Pimenov & Kljuykov
- Lalldhwojia staintonii Farille
