= Seshachalam Hills biosphere =

Protected area in Andhra Pradesh, India

Seshachalam Biosphere Reserve
- IUCN category V (protected landscape/seascape)
- Location: Eastern Ghats, Andhra Pradesh, India
- Nearest city: Tirupati
- Established: 20 September 2010
- Governing body: Ministry of Environment, Forest and Climate Change (MoEFCC)

Seshachalam Biosphere Reserve is located in the Eastern Ghats of Andhra Pradesh, India, encompassing parts of Chittoor and Kadapa districts. It is distinguished as the first biosphere reserve in Andhra Pradesh, recognized for its rich biodiversity and designated under UNESCO's Man and Biosphere (MAB) Programme on 20 September 2010.

== Biodiversity ==
The reserve is a floristic hotspot, home to many endemic and rare plants, including the endangered species like the golden gecko (Calodactylodes aureus). It also harbors a diverse range of fauna, including 12 species of lizard, 22 species of snake, and notable mammals such as the Indian giant squirrel and slender loris.

== Conservation Efforts ==
The Seshachalam Biosphere Reserve aims to fulfill three main functions: conservation of the region's biodiversity; development that is ecologically sustainable; and logistic support for research, education, and awareness. The reserve's establishment has been pivotal in protecting several endangered species and their habitats.

== Challenges ==
The reserve faces several challenges, including habitat destruction and the impacts of climate change, which have forced wildlife to venture into human-populated areas in search of water and food.

== See also ==
- Wildlife of India
- Biosphere reserves of India
- Eastern Ghats
