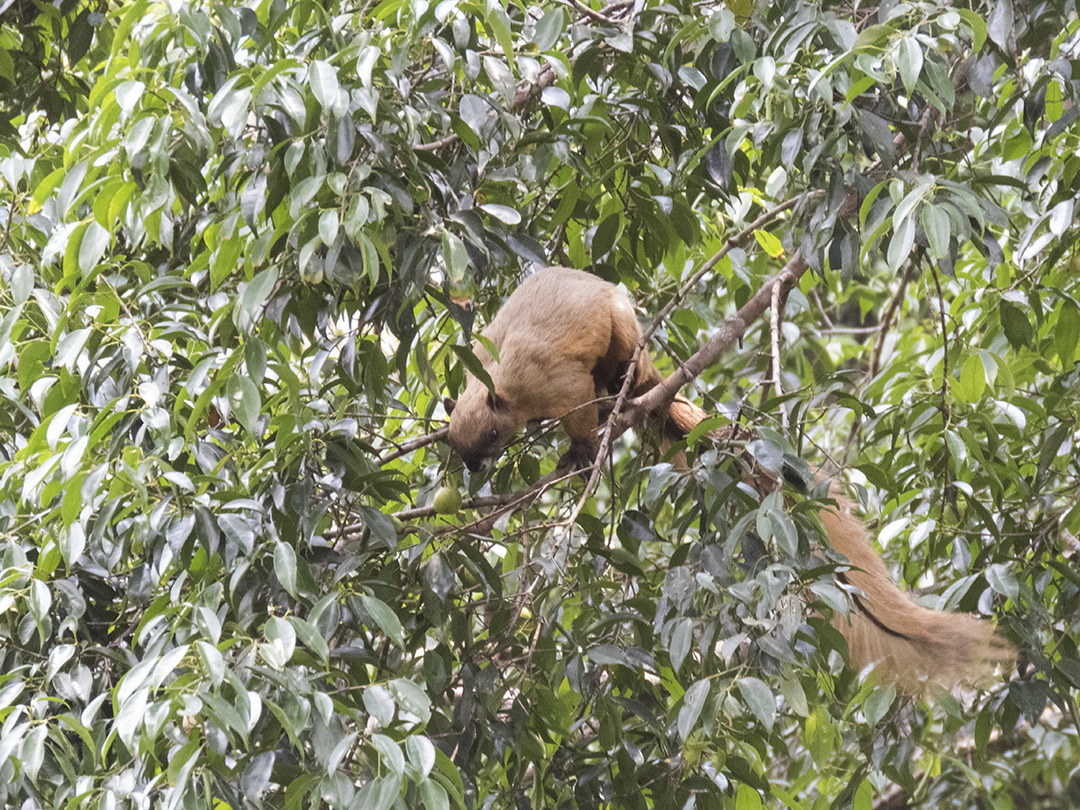

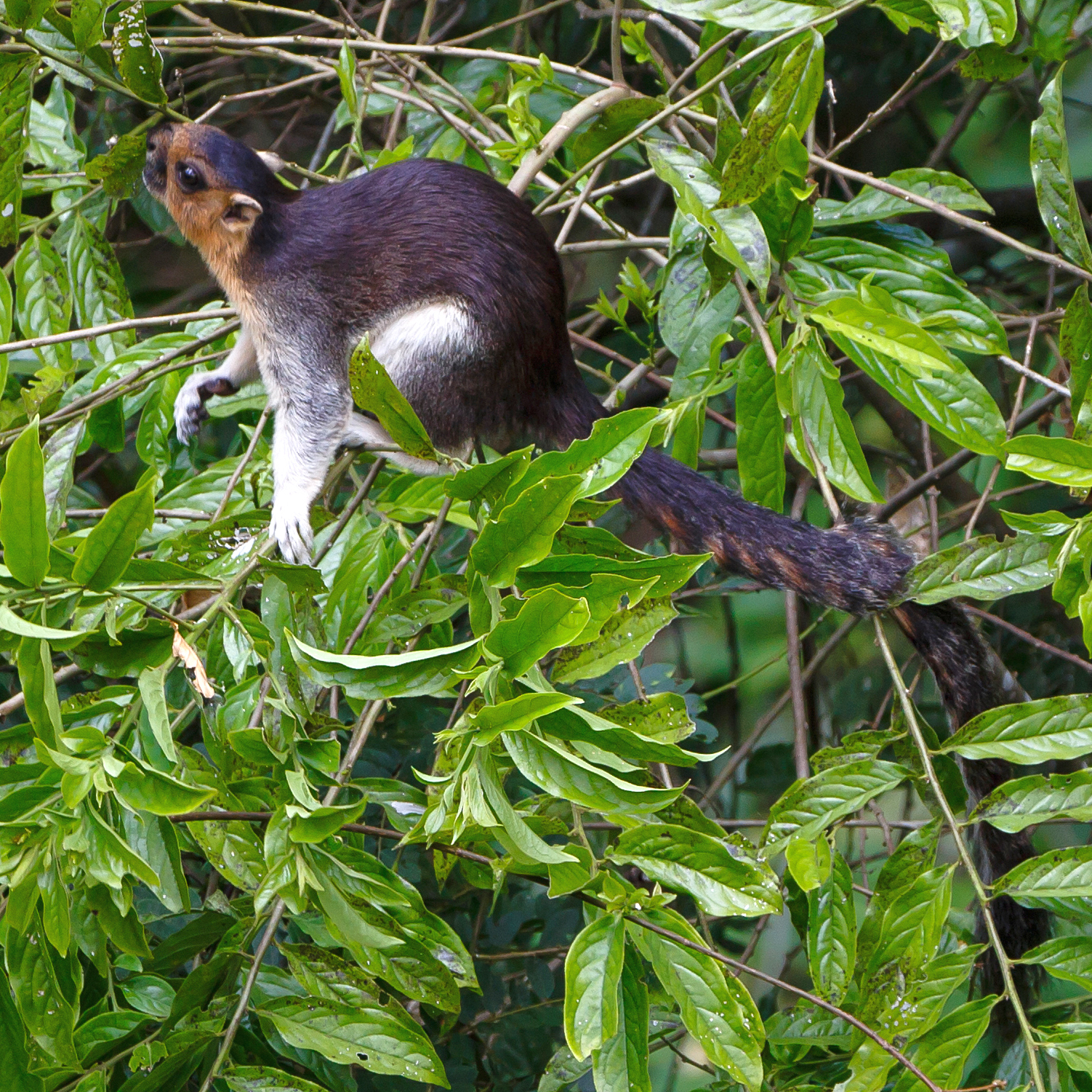
- Jerantut, Peninsular Malaysia (above) and Sepilok, Malaysian Borneo (below). Bornean populations often are much darker than those elsewhere

Conservation status
- Near Threatened (IUCN 3.1)
- CITES Appendix II

Scientific classification
- Kingdom: Animalia
- Phylum: Chordata
- Class: Mammalia
- Order: Rodentia
- Family: Sciuridae
- Genus: Ratufa
- Species: R. affinis

Binomial name
- Ratufa affinis (Raffles, 1821)

Subspecies
- R. a. affinis; R. a. bancana; R. a. baramensis; R. a. bunguranensis; R. a. cothurnata; R. a. ephippium; R. a. hypoleucos; R. a. insignis; R. a. polia
- Cream-coloured giant squirrel range

= Cream-coloured giant squirrel =

Species of rodent

The cream-coloured giant squirrel or pale giant squirrel (Ratufa affinis) is a large tree squirrel in the genus Ratufa found in forests in the Thai-Malay Peninsula, Sumatra (Indonesia), Borneo (Brunei, Indonesia and Malaysia) and nearby small islands. The species is near threatened and vulnerable to habitat degradation, and it has probably been extirpated in Singapore where the last sighting was in 1995. Reported sightings in Vietnam in 1984 are considered to be dubious.

== Description ==
The cream-coloured giant squirrel is one of the largest squirrels. It has a head–and–body length of 31–38 cm (1 ft 0 in – 1 ft 3 in), a tail length of 37–44 cm (1 ft 3 in – 1 ft 5 in) and weighs 875–1,500 g (1.929–3.307 lb). On average, adults of both sexes have a head–and–body length of about 34 cm (1 ft 1 in) and tail length of 42 cm (1 ft 5 in), while females weight about 1,250 g (2.76 lb) and males 1,050 g (2.31 lb).

As suggested by its name, the cream-coloured giant squirrel is typically overall cream to very light orangish-brown, while the underparts are whitish-cream. In Borneo and nearby small islands where it is the only Ratufa giant squirrel, some populations resemble cream-coloured giant squirrels from elsewhere, but most have upperparts that are medium-dark grey, sometimes almost black (contrasting strongly with the whitish-cream underparts), the flanks and thighs can have a reddish-buff tinge and the cheeks are orangish.

== Habitat ==
The cream-coloured giant squirrel makes its home in lower montane and secondary forests, frequenting dipterocarp trees. It rarely enters plantations or settlements, preferring the forest. Although this squirrel primarily inhabits the upper canopy of the forest, it will at times come to ground to find food, or to cross gaps in the trees.

== Behaviour ==
This species is diurnal, active from morning to evening. They live either in pairs or alone. When it is angry or shocked, it will give a loud sound that can be heard from afar.

Although this squirrel often will make holes in trees for shelter, during the breeding season it constructs a large globular drey (or nest) in tree branches, roughly the size of an eagle's aerie. The young are born and raised in this nest.

The main dietary habits of Ratufa affinis are seeds, which it supplements with leaves, fruits, nuts, bark, insects, and eggs. The squirrel has a very short thumb that it uses to hold and control its food while feeding.

Unlike other tree squirrels, the cream-coloured giant squirrel does not sit upright with its tail arched over its back while feeding; instead, it balances itself with its hind feet on a branch so that its hands are free to control its food. In this position the axis of the squirrels body is held at right angles to the support, with its head and forequarters on one side of the branch, and the tail as a counterweight on the other side.

== Taxonomy ==
The table below lists the nine recognized subspecies of Ratufa affinis, along with any synonyms associated with each subspecies:

Ratufa affinis taxonomy
Subspecies	Authority	Synonyms
R. a. affinis	Raffles (1821)	albiceps, aureiventer, frontalis, interposita, johorensis, klossi, pyrsonota
R. a. bancana	Lyon (1906)	none
R. a. baramensis	Bonhote (1900)	banguei, dulitensis, lumholtzi, sandakanensis
R. a. bunguranensis	Thomas and Hartert (1894)	confinis, nanogigas, notabilis, sirhassenensis
R. a. cothurnata	Lyon (1911)	griseicollis
R. a. ephippium	Müller (1838)	vittata, vittatula
R. a. hypoleucos	Horsfield (1823)	arusinus, balae, catemana, femoralis, masae, nigrescens, piniensis
R. a. insignis	Miller (1903)	bulana, carimonensis, condurensis, conspicua
R. a. polia	Lyon (1906)	none

== Bibliography ==
- Nowak, Ronald M. Walker's mammals of the world. Baltimore: Johns Hopkins University Press, 1999. ISBN 978-0-8018-5789-8, OCLC: 39045218. Chapter: "Sciuridae: squirrels, chipmunks, marmots, and prairie dogs" in volume two.
