= Cold Desert (biosphere reserve) =

Biosphere reserve in Himachal Pradesh, India

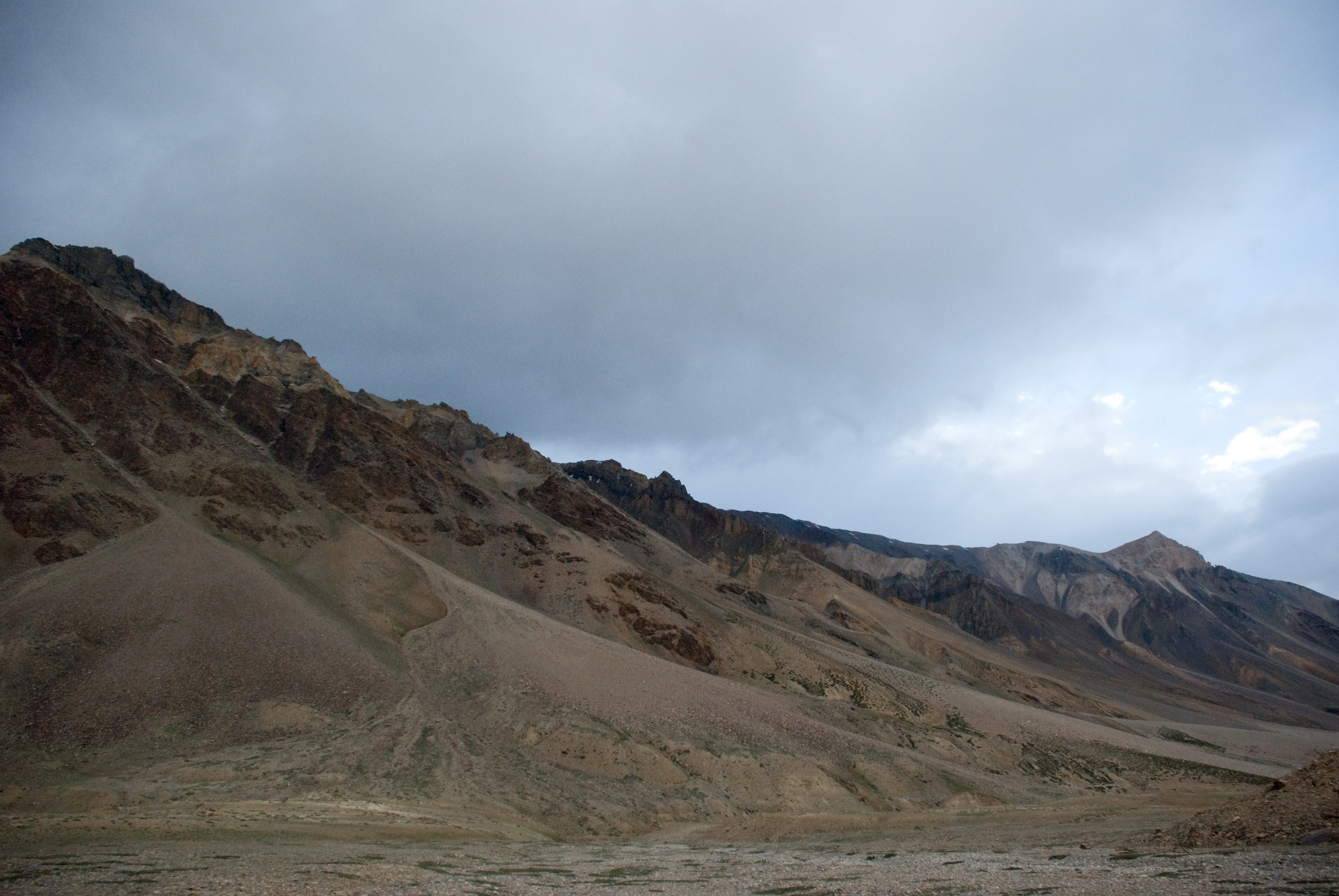
Sarchu, Ladakh

Cold Desert Biosphere Reserve is a biosphere reserve located in the Western Himalayas, within Himachal Pradesh in North India. It was established as a biosphere reserve in August 2009. Biosphere reserves are the areas of terrestrial and coastal ecosystems which promote the conservation of biodiversity with its sustainable use. There are over 738 biosphere reserves around the world in over 134 countries . The ministry of environment and forest provides financial assistance to the respective state governments for conservation of landscape, biological diversity and the cultural heritage. This region has the status of a Cold Desert biome, for two reasons, one is the leeward part of the Himalayas which is spared from monsoon winds and the other is its position at high altitude, on average 3000–5000 metres.

At the 5th World Congress of Biosphere Reserves held in Hangzhou (China), the Cold Desert Biosphere Reserve was included in the World Network of Biosphere Reserves. With this new addition, India now has 13 Biospheres listed in the World Network of Biosphere Reserves.

== Geography ==
Cold Desert has an area of 7,770 square kilometres (1,920,000 acres). The biosphere reserve encompasses the Chandratal Wildlife Sanctuary, Kibber Wildlife Sanctuary, Pin Valley National Park and Sarchu.

== Location ==
The cold deserts of India are located adjacent to the Himalayan Mountains. They are not affected by the Indian monsoons because they lie in the rain shadow of the Himalayas.

== Flora and fauna ==
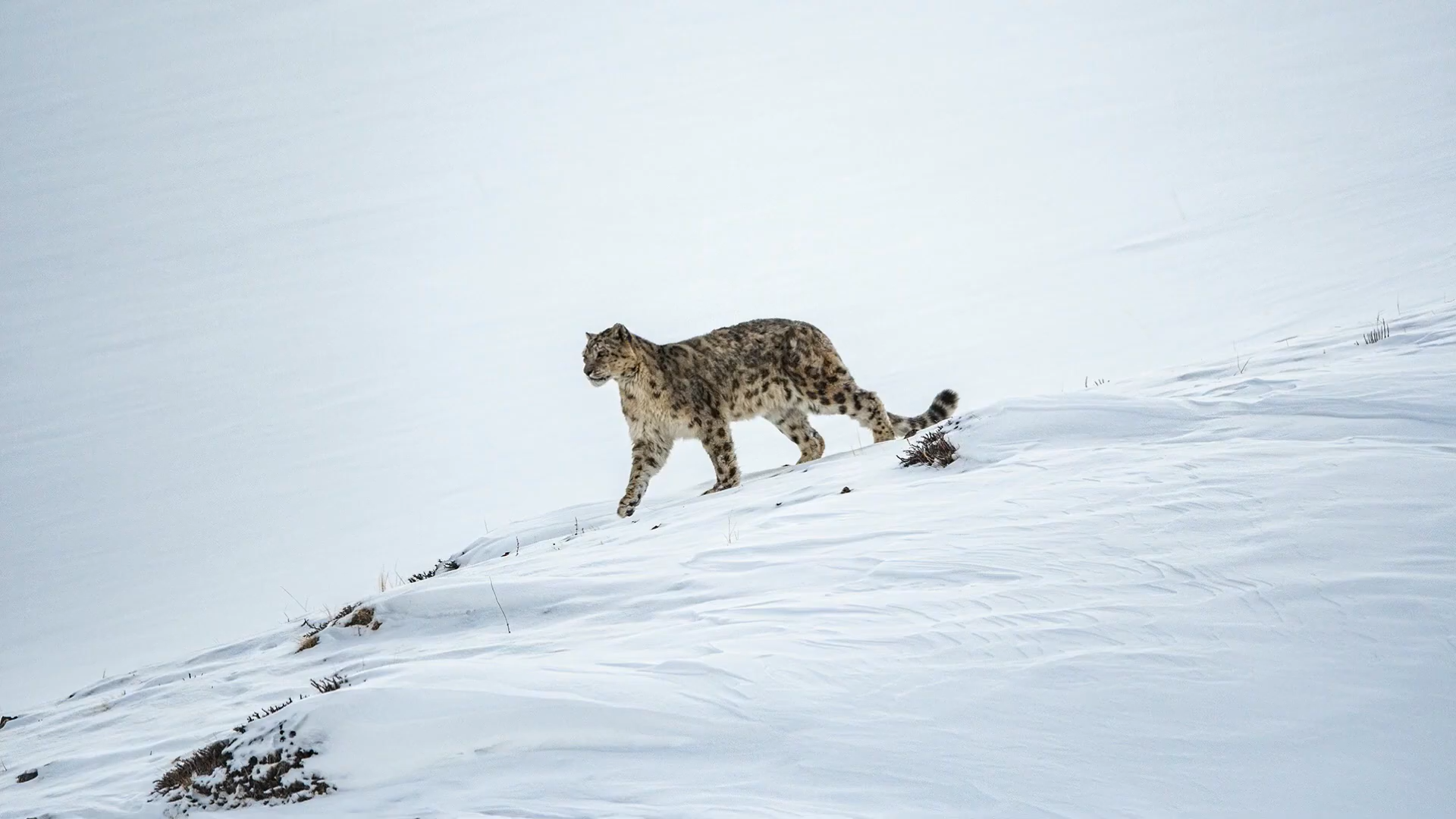
Snow leopard in Kibber Wildlife Sanctuary

Given the climatic conditions, there is significant biodiversity here. The Cold Desert is home to more than 500 species of plants, of which 118 species are medicinal plants. Some of the medicinal plants include Aconitum rotundifolium, Arnebia euchroma, Ephedra gerardiana, and Ferula jaeschkeanaKala, C.P. 2005. Several species of fauna that are on the Red List of IUCN as Critically Endangered Species are found here such as the snow leopard, Tibetan antelope and Himalayan wolf. Other species of fauna include woolly hare, Himalayan black bear, Himalayan brown bear, red fox, Himalayan ibex, Himalayan marmot, Himalayan blue sheep, red billed chough, Chukar partridge, snow partridge, blue rock pigeon, snow pigeon, Himalayan snowcock, lammergeier, Himalayan griffon, golden eagle, and rosefinch.

== See also ==
- Deserts of India
- Ecology of the Himalayas
- List of ecoregions in India
