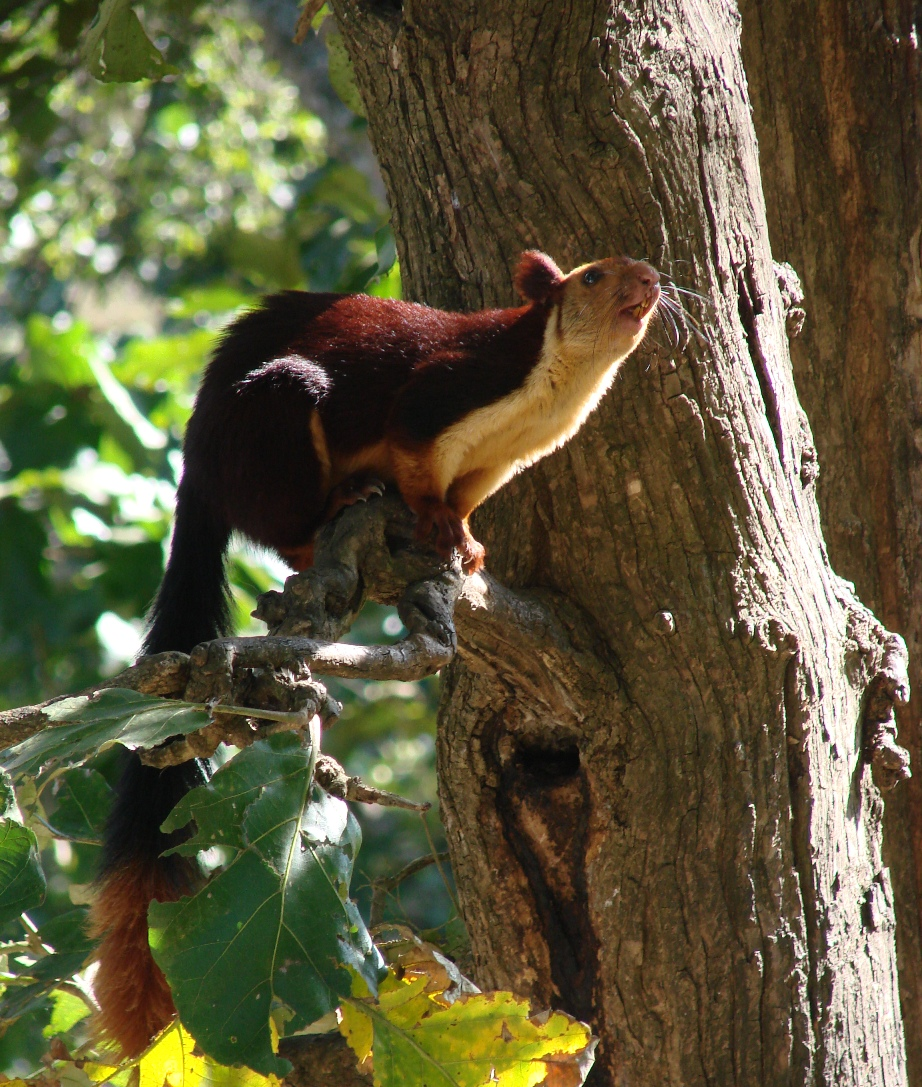
- Indian giant squirrel (Ratufa indica)

Scientific classification
- Kingdom: Animalia
- Phylum: Chordata
- Class: Mammalia
- Order: Rodentia
- Family: Sciuridae
- Subfamily: Ratufinae; Moore, 1959
- Genus: Ratufa; J. E. Gray, 1867

Type species
- Sciurus indicus Erxleben, 1777

Species
- Ratufa affinis Ratufa bicolor Ratufa indica Ratufa macroura

Synonyms
- Eoscuirus; Rukaia

= Oriental giant squirrel =

Oriental giant squirrels Temporal range: Middle Miocene to Recent

Genus of rodents

Oriental giant squirrels are cat-sized tree squirrels from the genus Ratufa in the subfamily Ratufinae. They are a distinctive element of the fauna of south and southeast Asia.

== Species ==
There are four living species of oriental giant squirrels:

Image	Common name	Scientific name	Distribution
	Cream-coloured giant squirrel	Ratufa affinis	Thai-Malay Peninsula, Sumatra (Indonesia), Borneo (Brunei, Indonesia and Malaysia)
	Black giant squirrel	Ratufa bicolor	Northern Bangladesh, northeast India, eastern Nepal, Bhutan, southern China, Myanmar, Laos, Thailand, Malaysia, Cambodia, Vietnam, and western Indonesia (Java, Sumatra, Bali and nearby small islands)
	Indian giant squirrel	Ratufa indica	India
	Grizzled giant squirrel	Ratufa macroura	Southern India, Sri Lanka

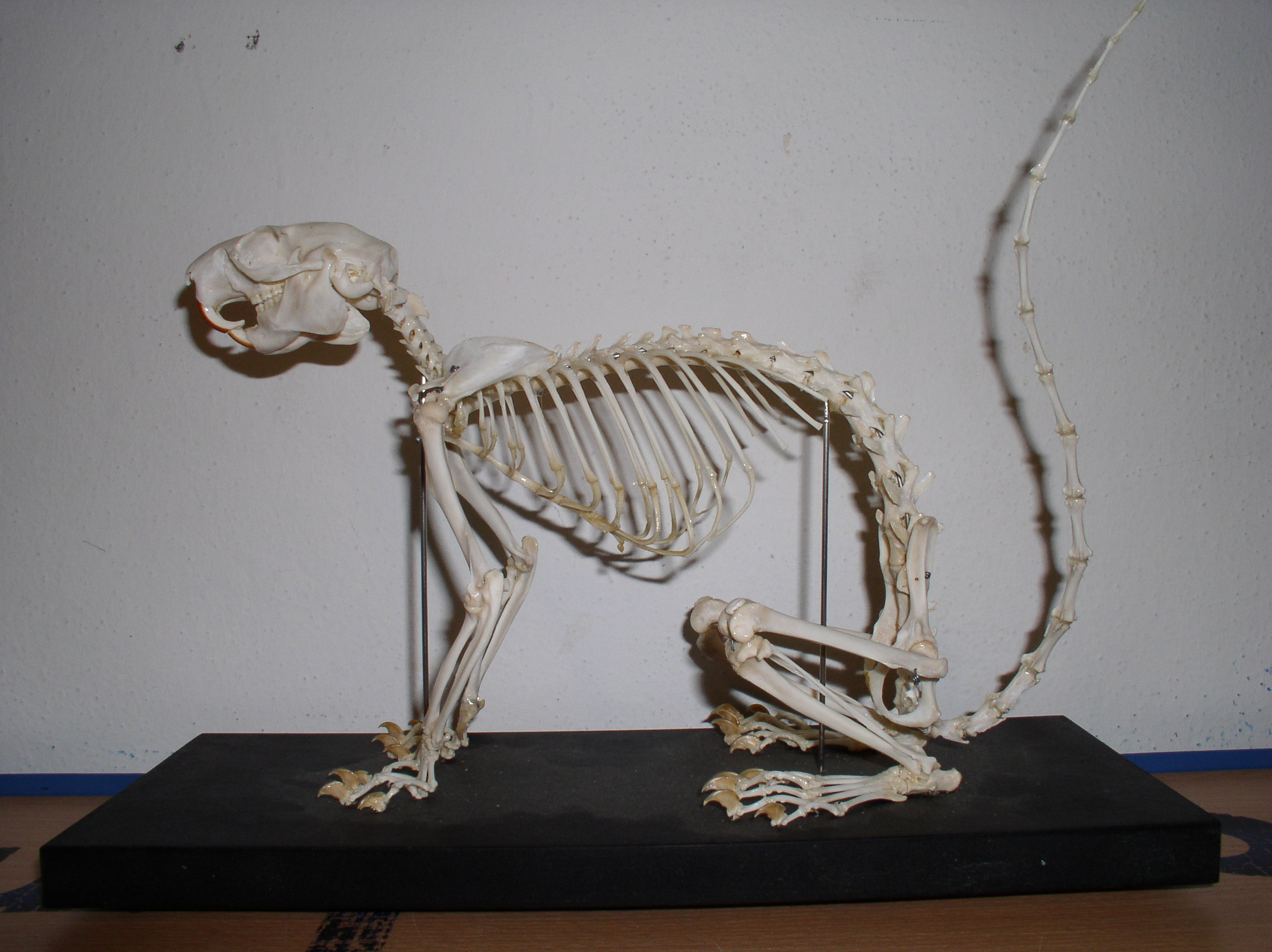
Skeleton of a Ratufa species

In prehistoric times this lineage was more widespread. For example, animals very similar to Ratufa and possibly belonging to this genus, at least belonging to the Ratufinae, were part of the early Langhian (Middle Miocene, some 16–15.2 million years ago) Hambach fauna of Germany.
