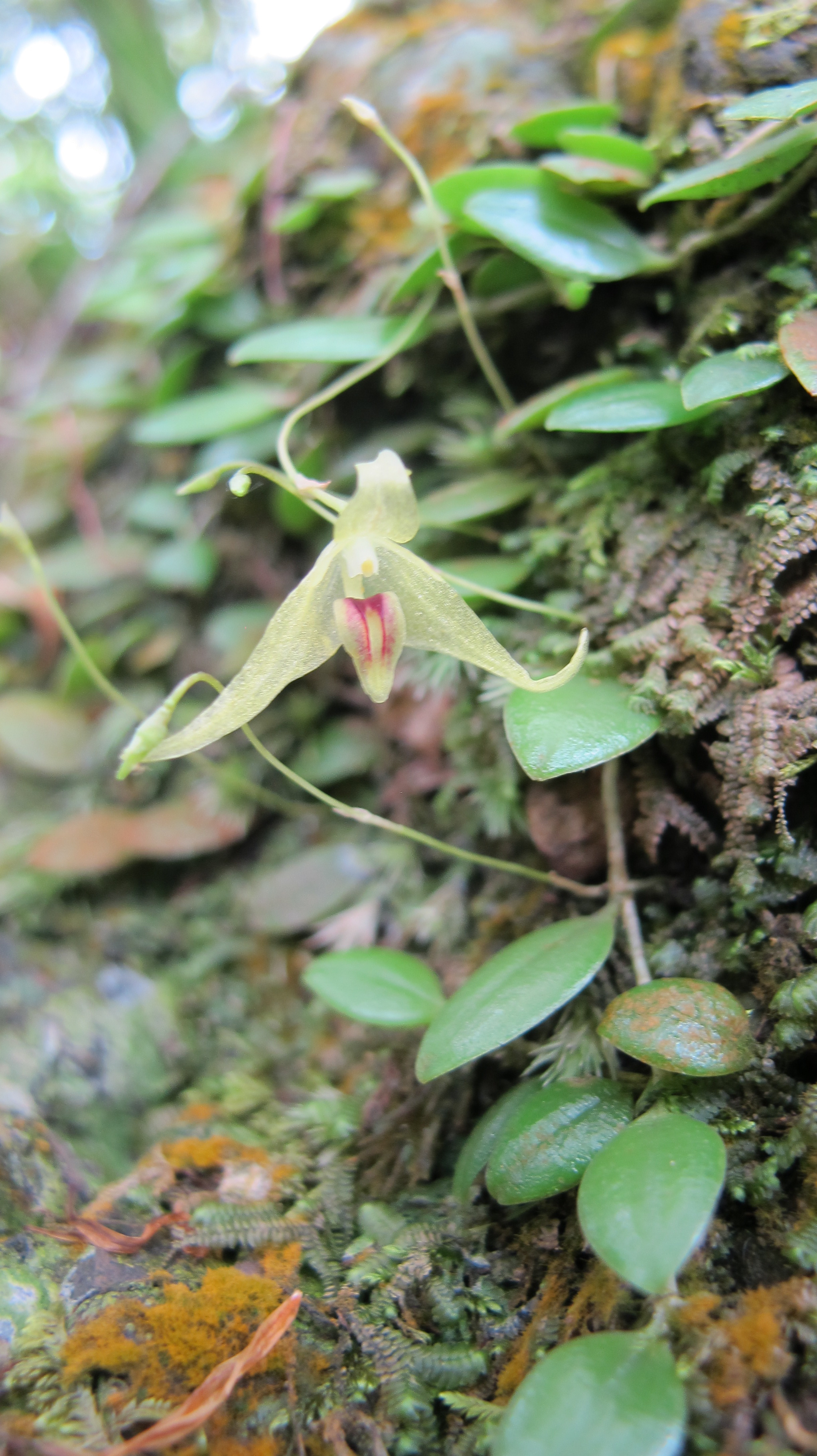

Scientific classification
- Kingdom: Plantae
- Clade: Tracheophytes
- Clade: Angiosperms
- Clade: Monocots
- Order: Asparagales
- Family: Orchidaceae
- Subfamily: Epidendroideae
- Genus: Bulbophyllum
- Species: B. drymoglossum

Binomial name
- Bulbophyllum drymoglossum Maxim.

Synonyms
- Bulbophyllum drymoglossum f. atrosanguiflorum Masam. & Satomi

= Bulbophyllum drymoglossum =

Species of orchid

Bulbophyllum drymoglossum is a species of orchid in the family Orchidaceae. This species is native to southern China, Japan, Korea, Myanmar, and Taiwan.
