= Raorchestes sanctisilvaticus =

Conservation status
- Critically Endangered (IUCN 3.1)

Scientific classification
- Kingdom: Animalia
- Phylum: Chordata
- Class: Amphibia
- Order: Anura
- Family: Rhacophoridae
- Genus: Raorchestes
- Species: R. sanctisilvaticus

Binomial name
- Raorchestes sanctisilvaticus (Das and Chanda, 1997

Synonyms
- Philautus sanctisilvaticus Das and Chanda, 1997; Philautus sanctipalustris Das and Chanda, 1997 [lapsus]; Philautus similipalensis Dutta, 2003; Philautus terebrans Das & Chanda, 1998; Raorchestes terebrans (Das & Chanda, 1998)

Species of amphibian

Raorchestes sanctisilvaticus, also known as the sacred grove bushfrog, sacred grove bush frog or Similipal bush frog, is a critically endangered species of frog in the family Rhacophoridae.

== Distribution and habitat ==
It is endemic to India and only known from the Kapildhara Falls near Amarkantak, in the Madhya Pradesh state and Gurguria, in the Similipal Biosphere Reserve (near or in the Simlipal National Park), Odisha state in south-eastern India.

Its natural habitat is old growth tropical moist, semi-evergreen and mesic forest. It has been found underneath rotten sal (Shorea robusta) leaves, and in loose leaf-covered soil and inside rotten logs, close to riverbanks, and likely in tropical dry forest. It is threatened by habitat loss caused by harvesting of wood for subsistence purposes, infrastructure development for tourism, and fires.
