= Wild mango =

Wild mango may refer to

- Wild growing forms of the mango, Mangifera indica
- Some other plants of Mangifera genus, especially Mangifera pajang, a wild mango native to Borneo, in the family Anacardiaceae
- Buchanania obovata, a medium sized tree native to Australia, in the family Anacardiaceae
- Cordyla africana, a large tree native to eastern Africa, in the family Fabaceae
- Irvingia gabonensis, a large tree native to western Africa, in the family Irvingiaceae
- Spondias pinnata, an Asian tree with sour fruits
