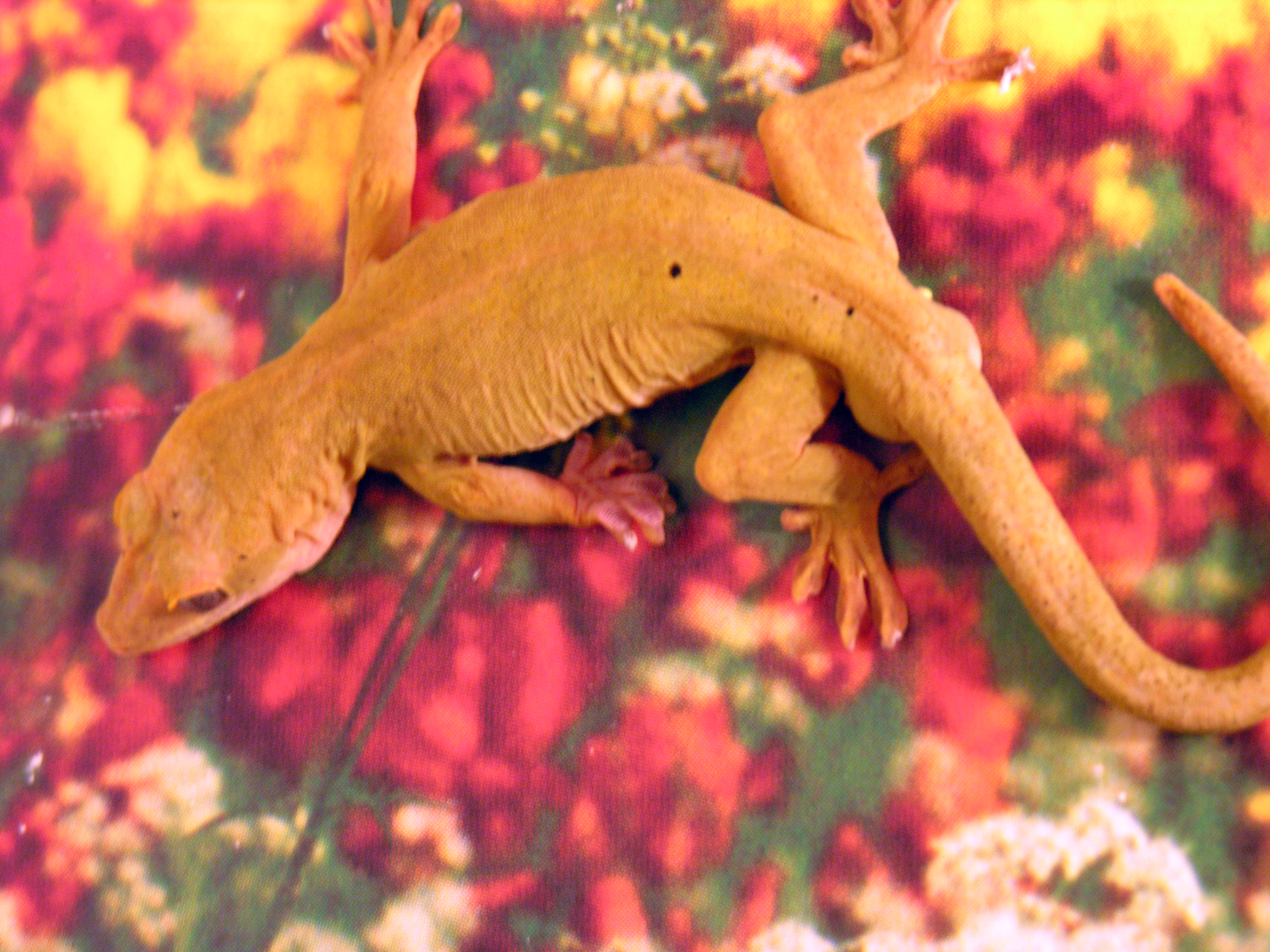

Conservation status
- Endangered (IUCN 3.1)

Scientific classification
- Kingdom: Animalia
- Phylum: Chordata
- Class: Reptilia
- Order: Squamata
- Suborder: Gekkota
- Family: Gekkonidae
- Genus: Gekko
- Species: G. badenii

Binomial name
- Gekko badenii Szczerbak & Nekrasova, 1994
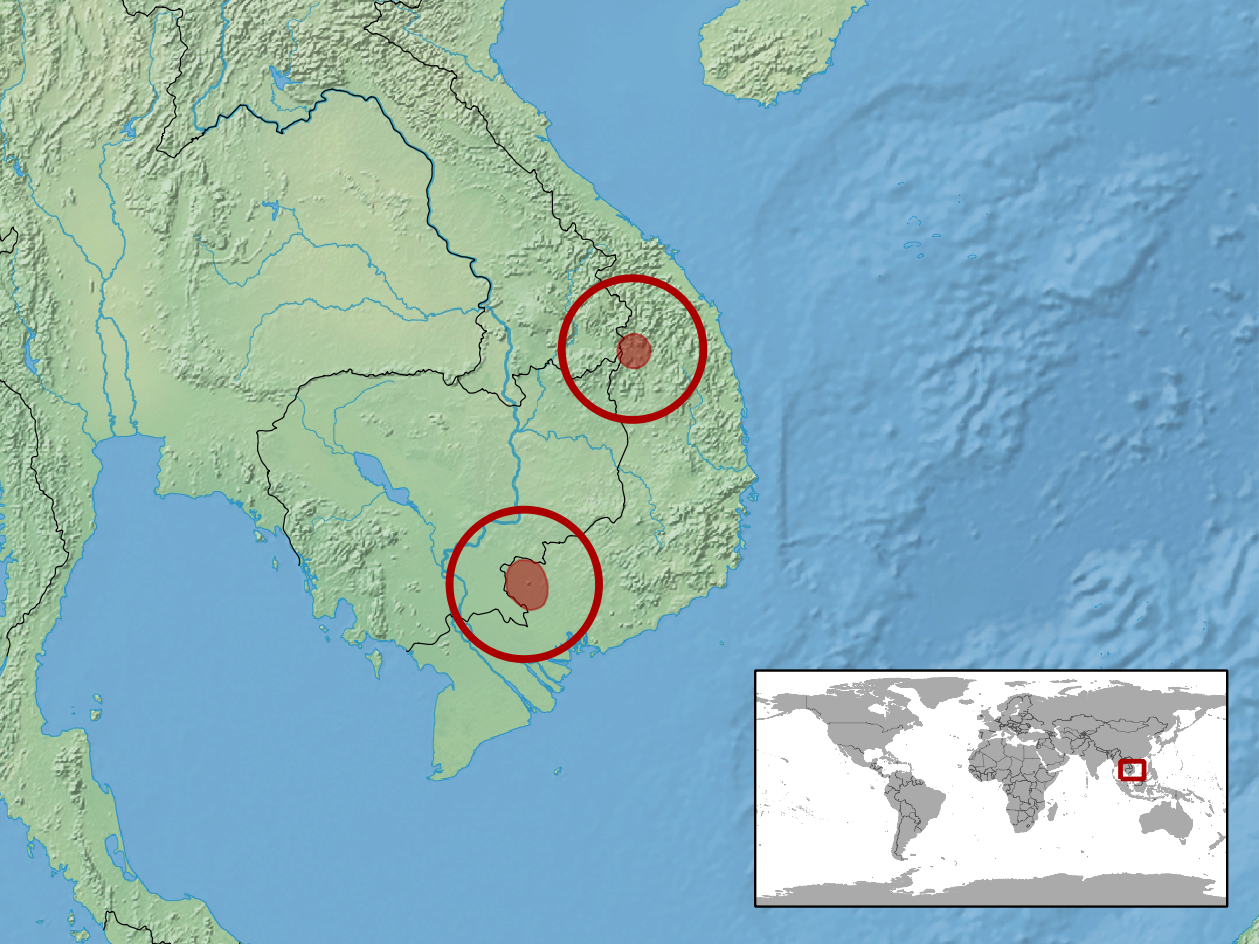

Synonyms
- Gekko ulikovskii Darevsky & Orlov, 1994

= Golden gecko =

Species of lizard

The golden gecko (Gekko badenii), also known commonly as Baden's Pacific gecko, is a species of lizard in the family Gekkonidae. The species is native to Vietnam.

== Etymology ==
The specific name, badenii, refers to Núi Bà Đen (Black Lady Mountain where Bà Đen is Black Lady), to which this species is indigenous.

== Description ==
The golden gecko gets its common name from the gold-colored scales on its body. Males grow to around 7 to 8 inches (18 to 20 cm) in total length (including tail), while females stay around 5 to 6 inches (13 to 15 cm). Males have a longer tail base, with fleshy knobs at the base of the tail. Pores appear on the insides of the legs, while females have none of these.

== Geographic range ==
G. badenii has been reported from the Tây Ninh Province and Kon Tum Province of southern Vietnam (the latter following the recognition of Gekko ulikovskii as a synonym of this species).

== Habitat ==
The preferred natural habitat of G. badenii is granite rocky areas including those in lowland rainforest, at altitudes from sea level to 986 m (3,235 ft).

== Diet ==
The golden gecko is primarily lives on bugs, but will also take some fruit. The golden gecko hydrates by drinking water from rainfall collecting on leaves.

== Reproduction ==
G. badenii is oviparous.

== As a pet ==
The golden gecko is not very popular in the pet trade, so most specimens are wild caught. It requires a terrarium of a minimum of 20 US gallons (about 80 litres) for an adult, though a vertical 18 in x 18 in x 24 in (about 45 cm x 45 cm x 60 cm) Exo Terra tank could accommodate an adult due to the greater space. Two golden geckos of the same sex should not be housed together because they will fight. Captive hatchlings feed daily, and adults only need food every 5–6 days. Juveniles and adults will eat crickets and meal worms, wax worms, and fruits, such as bananas and mangos, which are rich in calcium.
