= Ecology of the Himalayas =

The ecology of the Himalayas varies with climate, rainfall, altitude, and soils. The climate ranges from tropical at the base of the mountains to permanent ice and snow at the highest elevations. The amount of yearly rainfall increases from west to east along the southern front of the range. This diversity of climate, altitude, rainfall and soil conditions supports a variety of distinct plant and animal species, such as the Nepal gray langur (Semnopithecus schistaceus)

== Lowland forests ==
On the Indo-Gangetic Plain at the base of the mountains, an alluvial plain drained by the Indus and Ganges-Brahmaputra river systems, vegetation varies from west to east with rainfall. The xeric Northwestern thorn scrub forests occupy the plains of Pakistani and the Indian Punjab. Further east lie the Upper Gangetic Plains moist deciduous forests of Uttarakhand and Uttar Pradesh and the Lower Gangetic Plains moist deciduous forests of Bihar and West Bengal. These are monsoon forests, with drought-deciduous trees that lose their leaves during the dry season. The moister Brahmaputra Valley semi-evergreen forests occupy the plains of Assam and the subtropical moist forests in lower valleys of Margalla hills.

== The Terai belt ==
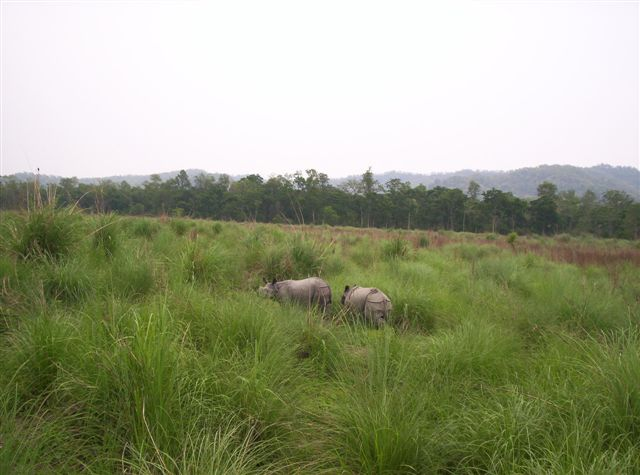
Indian rhinoceros in the Terai

Above the alluvial plain lies the Terai strip, a seasonally marshy zone of sand and clay soils. The Terai has higher rainfall than the plains, and the downward-rushing rivers of the Himalaya slow down and spread out in the flatter Terai zone, depositing fertile silt during the monsoon season and receding in the dry season. The Terai has a high water table due to groundwater percolating down from the adjacent zone. The central part of the Terai belt is occupied by the Terai-Duar savanna and grasslands, a mosaic of grasslands, savannas, deciduous and evergreen forests that includes some of the world's tallest grasslands. The grasslands of the Terai belt are home to the Indian rhinoceros (Rhinoceros unicornis).

== Bhabhar belt ==
Above the Terai belt is an upland zone known as the Bhabhar, a zone of porous and rocky soils made up of debris washed down from the higher ranges. The belt lies at the foot of the Himalayas where the Himalayan streams descend on to the plains. The Bhabhar and the lower Shiwalik ranges have a subtropical climate. The Himalayan subtropical pine forests occupy the western end of the subtropical belt, with forests dominated by Chir Pine (Pinus roxburghii). The central part of the range is home to the Himalayan subtropical broadleaf forests, an ecoregion that has many different kinds of forest. One kind of forest is dominated by the sal tree (Shorea robusta).

== Siwalik Hills ==
Also called Churia or Margalla Hills, Sivalik Hills is an intermittent outermost range of foothills extending across the Himalayan region through Pakistan, India, Nepal and Bhutan. This region consists of many sub-ranges. Summits are generally 1,500 to 2,000 meters (4,900 to 6,600 ft). Steeper southern slopes form along a fault zone called Himalayan Frontal Thrust (HFT); northern slopes are gentler. Permeable conglomerates and other rocks allow rainwater to percolate downslope into the Bhabhar and Terai, supporting only scrubby forests upslope. The Himalayan subtropical moist broadleaf forests continue here.

== Inner Terai or Dun Valleys ==
The Inner Terai valleys are open valleys north of Shiwalik Hills or nestled between Shiwalik subranges. Examples include Dehra Dun in India and Chitwan in Nepal. Himalayan subtropical moist broadleaf forests grow here.

== Lesser Himalaya ==
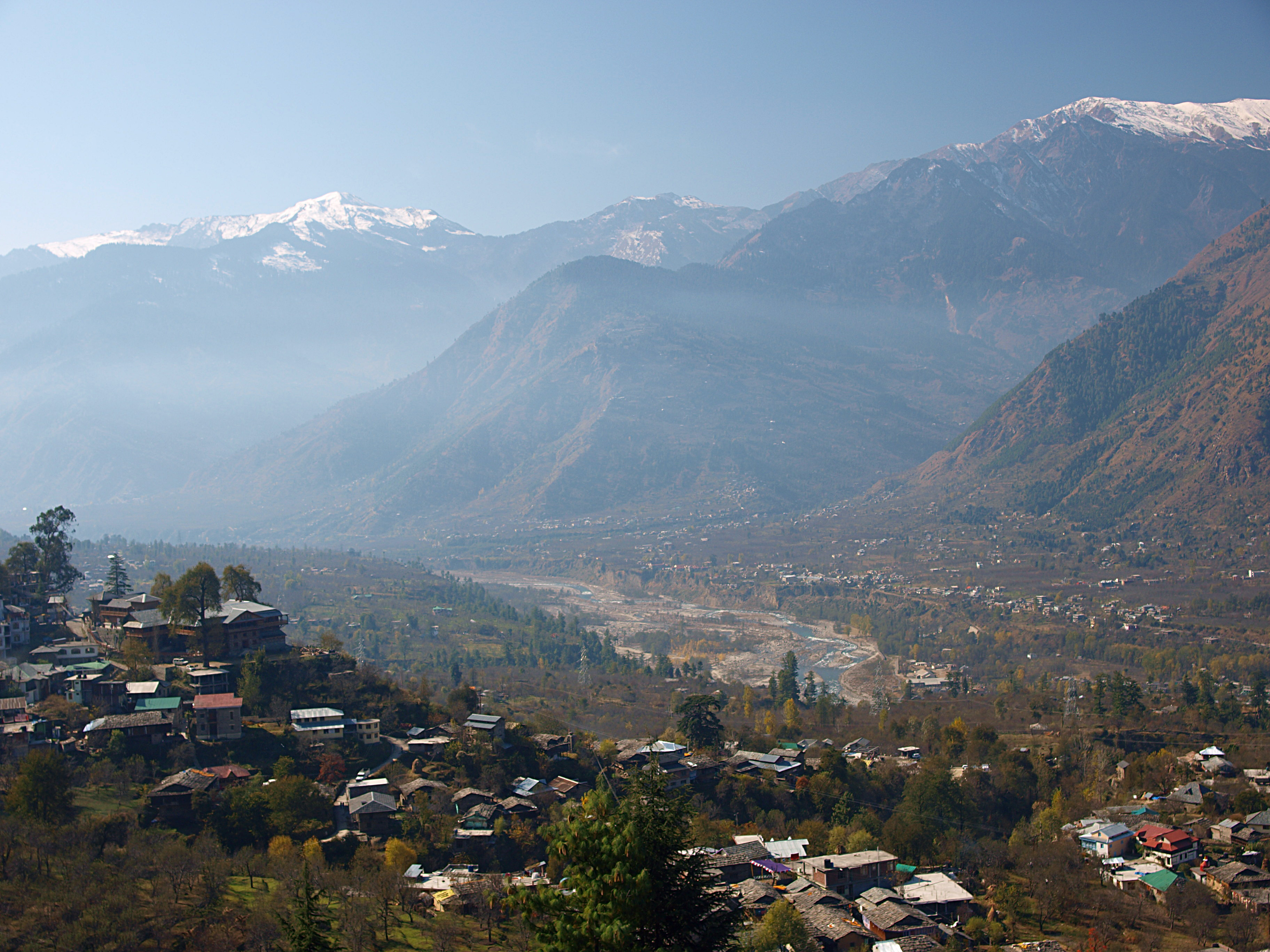
Himalayas from Kullu Valley, Himachal Pradesh.

Also called the Mahabharat Range, the Lesser Himalayas is a prominent range 2,000 to 3,000 meters (6,600 to 9,800 ft) high formed along the Main Boundary Thrust fault zone, with a steep southern face and gentler northern slopes. The range is nearly continuous except for river gorges, where groups of rivers from the north gather like candelabra in a handful of places to break through the range.

At these elevations and above, the biogeography of the Himalayas is generally divided by the Kali Gandaki Gorge in central Nepal, one of the deepest canyons in the world.

At the middle elevations of the range, the subtropical forests yield to a belt of temperate broadleaf and mixed forests growing between 1,500 and 3,000 meters (4,900 and 9,800 ft), with the western Himalayan broadleaf forests to the west of the Gandaki River, and the eastern Himalayan broadleaf forests to the east. The western broadleaf forests stretch from the Kashmir Valley, across Himachal Pradesh and Uttarakhand, and through western Nepal. The eastern broadleaf forests stretch across eastern Nepal, through Sikkim and Bhutan, and through much of Arunachal Pradesh.

== Midlands ==
This 'hilly' region (Pahad), averaging about 1,000 meters (3,300 ft) immediately north of the Mahabharat Range, rises to about 4,000 meters (13,000 ft) over a distance of 100 kilometres (62 mi) at the Main Central Thrust fault zone, where the Greater Himalaya begin.

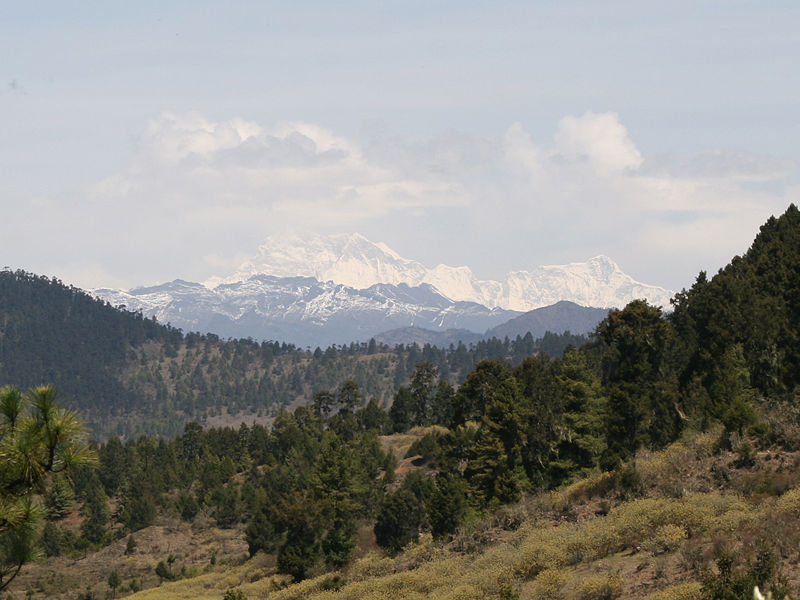
Subalpine forest at Cher-tang La, Bhutan

Above the broadleaf forests, between 3,000 and 4,000 meters (9,800 and 13,100 ft), are temperate coniferous forests, likewise split by the Gandaki River. The western Himalayan subalpine conifer forests are found below treeline in northern Pakistan, Jammu and Kashmir, Himachal Pradesh, Uttarakhand, and western Nepal. The eastern Himalayan subalpine conifer forests are found in eastern Nepal, Sikkim, Bhutan, and Arunachal Pradesh. Along the border between Arunachal Pradesh and Tibet, the eastern subalpine conifer forests mix with the northeastern Himalayan subalpine conifer forests. East Himalayan Fir, West Himalayan Spruce, and Himalayan Hemlock are some important trees of these forests. Rhododendrons are exceptionally diverse here, with over 60 species recorded in the northeastern Himalayan subalpine conifer forests.

== Greater Himalaya ==
North of the Main Central Thrust, the highest ranges rise abruptly as much as 4,000 meters (13,000 ft) into the realm of perpetual snow and ice. As the Himalayan system becomes wider from east to west, the number of parallel high ranges increases. For example, the Kagmara and Kanjiroba ranges both reach well over 6,000 meters (20,000 ft) north of the Dhaulagiri Himalaya in central Nepal.

Valley of the Flowers

- Alpine tundra lies above treeline. The areas above natural treeline is chiefly composed of annuals, which is differentiated into alpine grasslands and meadows. The steep slopes are mainly predominated by grasses whereas the meadows are dominated by herbaceous species. The northwestern Himalayan alpine shrub and meadows are found in the high elevations of northern Pakistan, Jammu and Kashmir, and Himachal Pradesh. To the east, the western Himalayan alpine shrub and meadows cover extensive areas along the Tibetan border with Uttarakhand and western Nepal. The eastern Himalayan alpine shrub and meadows grow above the eastern and northeastern subalpine conifer forests, along the Tibetan border with eastern Nepal, Sikkim, Bhutan, and Arunachal Pradesh. The shrublands are composed of junipers as well as a wide variety of rhododendrons. They also possess a remarkable variety of wildflowers: Valley of Flowers National Park in the western Himalayan alpine shrub and meadows contains over 520 species of plants, of these 498 are flowering plants. The upper limit of the grasslands increases from west to east, rising from 3,500 meters (11,500 ft) to 5,500 meters (18,000 ft). The grasslands are the summer habitat of the endangered snow leopard (Panthera uncia).

== Trans-Himalaya ==
The watershed between rivers flowing south into the Ganges or Indus and rivers flowing north into the Brahmaputra or mainstem Indus that flow around the ends of the entire range often follows somewhat lower, less rugged mountains tens of kilometers north of the highest ranges. South-flowing rivers form valleys in this region, often semi-arid due to rainshadow effects. These valleys hold some of the highest permanent villages on earth on the slopes.

== Ecoregions ==
These are the ecoregions of the Himalayas and adjoining areas:

=== Montane grasslands and shrublands ===
- Karakoram–West Tibetan Plateau alpine steppe
- Southeast Tibet shrub and meadows
- Northwestern Himalayan alpine shrub and meadows
- Western Himalayan alpine shrub and meadows
- Eastern Himalayan alpine shrub and meadows

=== Temperate coniferous forest ===
- Western Himalayan subalpine conifer forests
- Eastern Himalayan subalpine conifer forests
- Northeastern Himalayan subalpine conifer forests

=== Temperate broadleaf and mixed forests ===
- Western Himalayan broadleaf forests
- Eastern Himalayan broadleaf forests

=== Tropical and subtropical coniferous forests ===
- Himalayan subtropical pine forests

=== Tropical and subtropical moist broadleaf forests ===
- Himalayan subtropical broadleaf forests
- Margalla Hills subtropical broadleaf forests
- Brahmaputra Valley semi-evergreen forests

=== Tropical and subtropical grasslands, savannas, and shrublands ===
- Terai–Duar savanna and grasslands

=== Deserts and xeric shrublands ===
- Balochistan xeric woodlands
