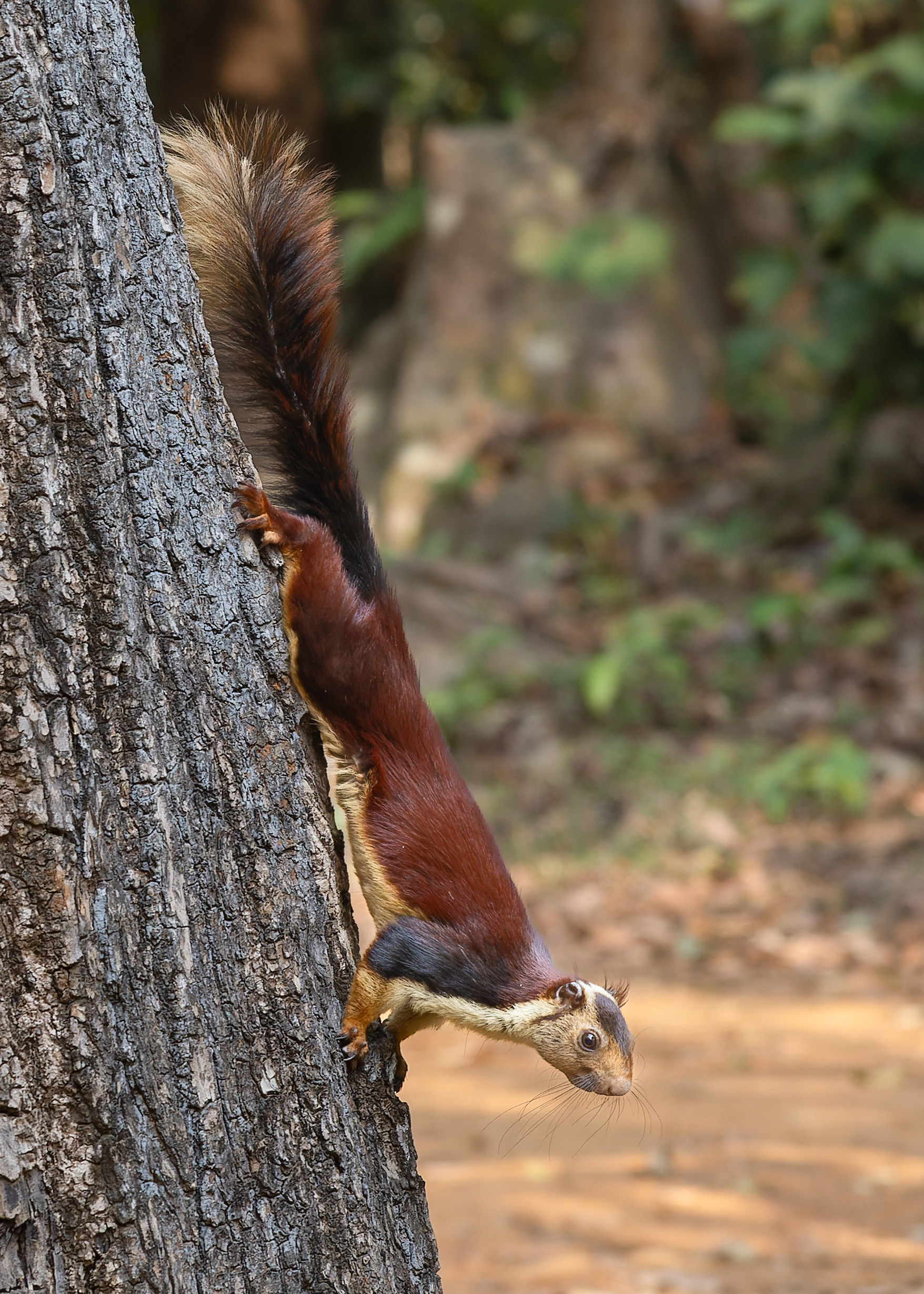
- In Kuldiha Wildlife Sanctuary, India

Conservation status
- Least Concern (IUCN 3.1)
- CITES Appendix II

Scientific classification
- Kingdom: Animalia
- Phylum: Chordata
- Class: Mammalia
- Infraclass: Placentalia
- Order: Rodentia
- Family: Sciuridae
- Genus: Ratufa
- Species: R. indica

Binomial name
- Ratufa indica (Erxleben, 1777)

Subspecies
- R. i. indica; R. i. centralis; R. i. dealbata; R. i. maxima
- Indian giant squirrel range

= Indian giant squirrel =

Species of squirrel

The Indian giant squirrel or Malabar giant squirrel (Ratufa indica) is a large multi-coloured tree squirrel species endemic to forests and woodlands in India. It is a diurnal, arboreal, and mainly herbivorous squirrel.

== Distribution and habitat ==
This species is endemic to India, with sections of its distribution in the Western Ghats, Eastern Ghats and Satpura Range as far north as Madhya Pradesh (approximately 22° N). It is found at altitudes of 180–2,300 m (590–7,550 ft) in tropical deciduous, semi-deciduous (where often utilizing denser riparian growth), and moist evergreen forests and woodlands. In general, its distribution is fragmented because it is intolerant of habitat degradation. The Indian giant squirrel generally nests in taller trees with a mean height of 11 m (36 ft) (±3 m (10 ft) SD) in order to avoid predators.

== Description ==
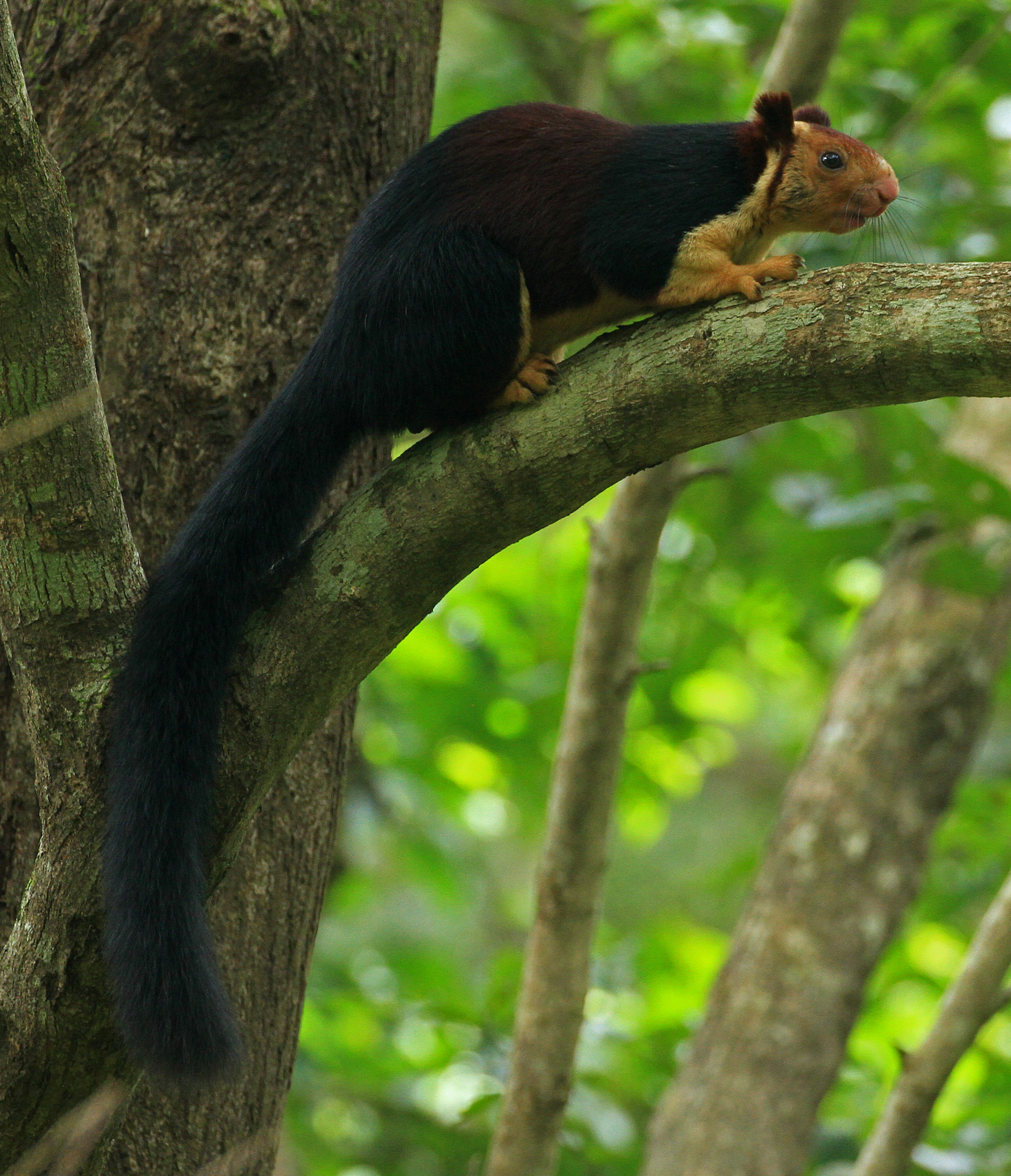
R. i. maxima in Kerala

The Indian giant squirrel is one of the largest squirrels, with a head–and–body length of 25–50 cm (10–20 in), a tail that is about the same or somewhat longer, and a weight of 1.5–2 kg (3–4 lb), although rarely up to 3 kg (7 lb). Average for both sexes is about 36 cm (1 ft 2 in) in head–and–body length, 45 cm (1 ft 6 in) in tail length and 1.7–1.8 kg (3.7–4.0 lb) in weight.

It has a conspicuous one-, two-, or three-toned colour scheme. The colours involved can be whitish, creamy-beige, buff, tan, rust, reddish-maroon, brown, dark seal brown, or black. The underparts and the front legs are usually cream coloured, and the head can be brown or beige, and there is a distinctive white spot between the ears. Otherwise the colours depend on the subspecies.

=== Subspecies ===
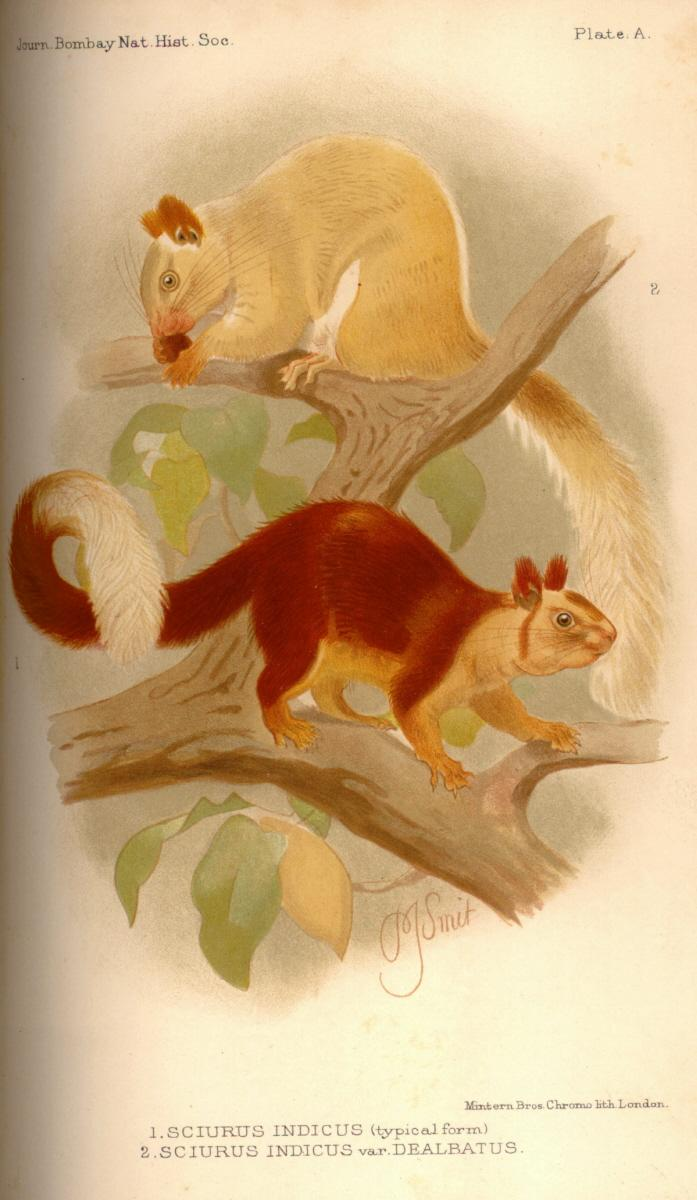
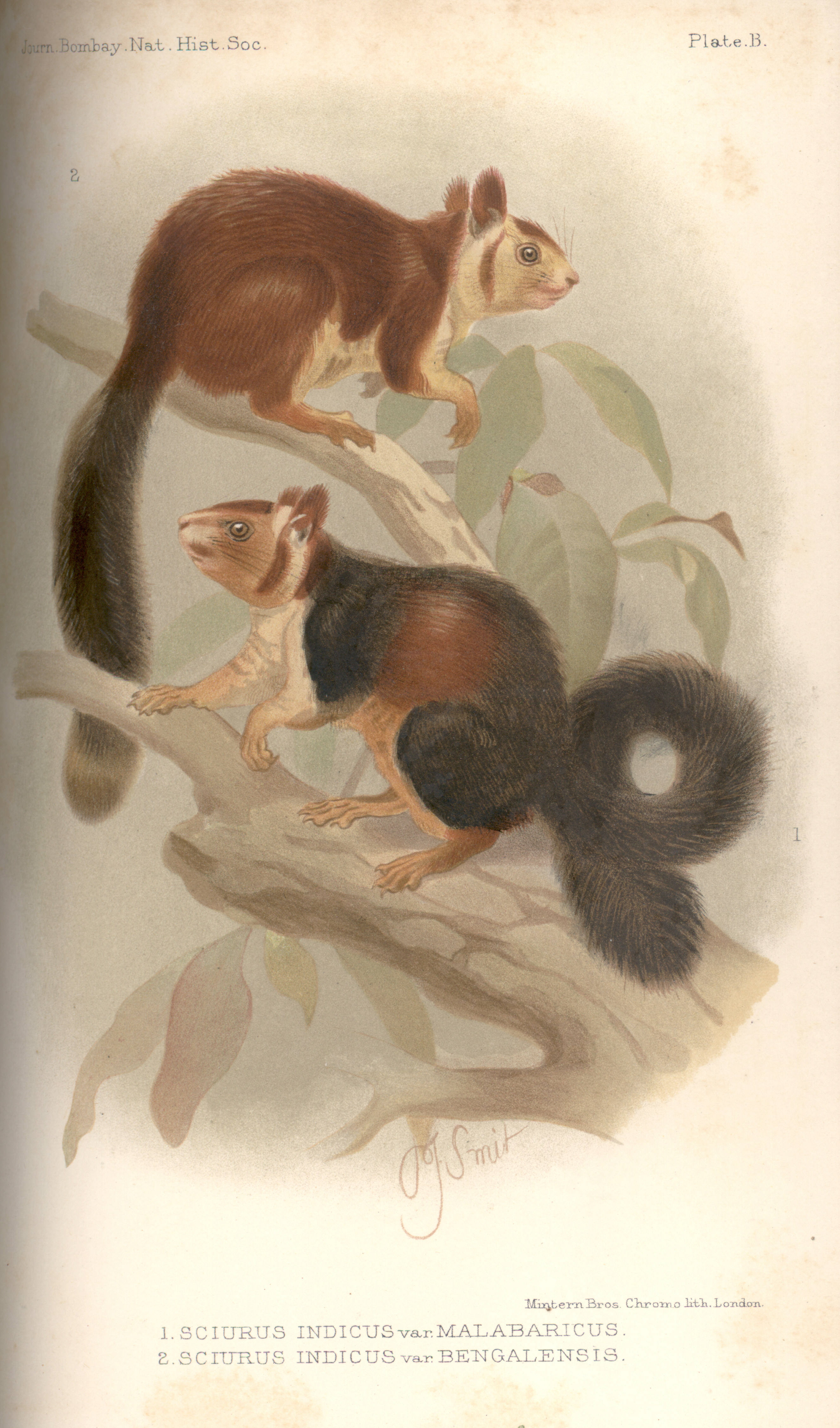
- R. i. dealbatus (top left)
- R. i. indica (below left)
- "R. i. bengalensis" (=R. i. indica–maxima intergrade; top right)
- R. i. maxima (below right)

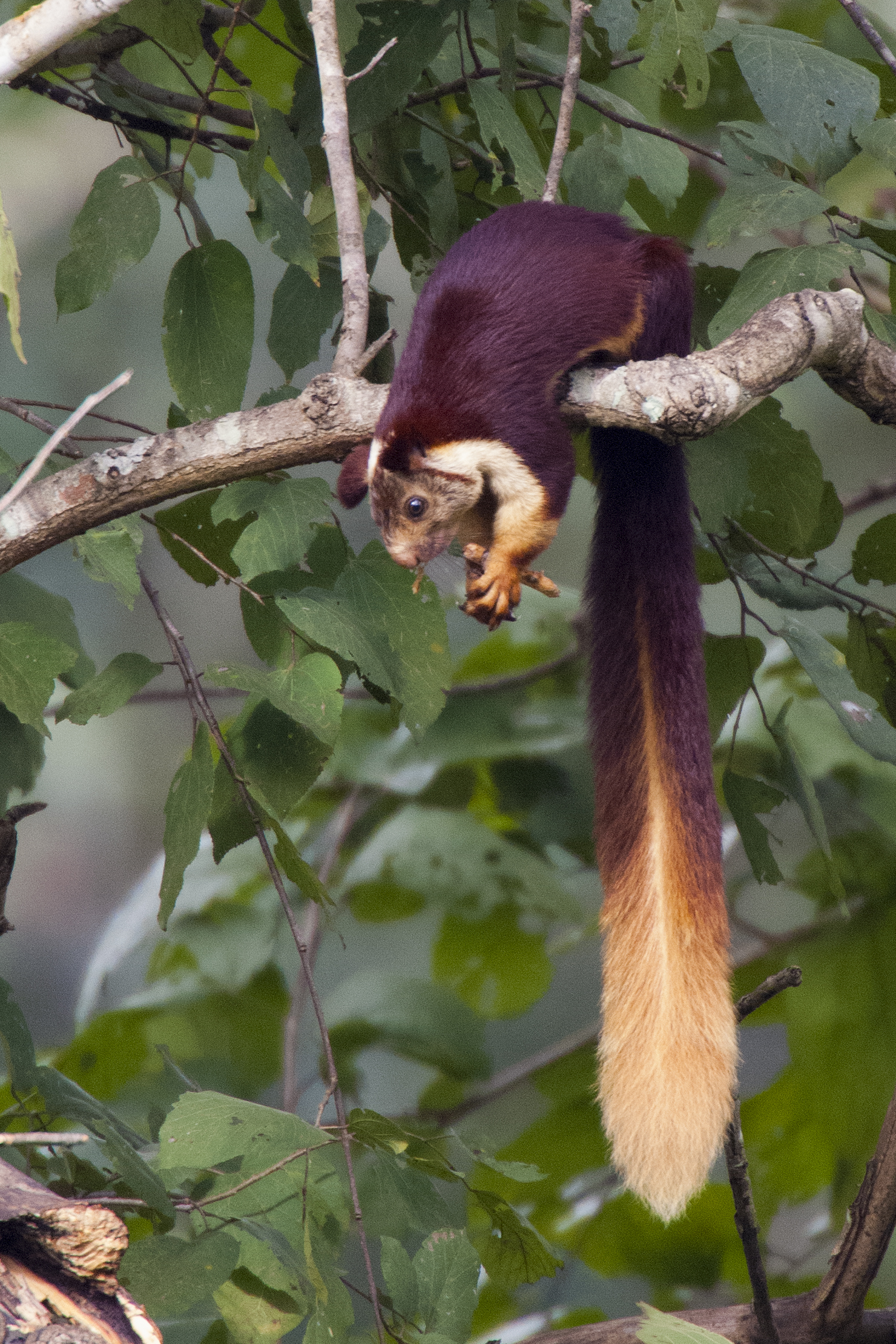
R. i. indica in Bhadra Wildlife Sanctuary, Karnataka, India

Ten subspecies have been described, but recent authorities generally recognise four:

- R. i. indica: Found in the northern and central Western Ghats from around Mumbai to Karnataka. Its upper parts and basal half of the tail are rich reddish-maroon or reddish-brown; the distal part of the tail is whitish or buff. On occasion there can be some black at the shoulder or at the very base of the tail (features typically associated with other subspecies). A few other subspecies have been described within its range based on variations in size, overall colour hue and width of the pale tail-tip, but recent authorities generally regard them as synonyms of R. i. indica.
- R. i. centralis: From central and eastern India, notably in the Satpura Range and Eastern Ghats (all other subspecies are from the Western Ghats region). It is relatively small and further differs from R. i. indica by its black shoulder region, black tail except for the pale tip, and sometimes black rump.
- R. i. dealbata: Found in southern Gujarat (far northern Western Ghats region), but recent surveys have failed to locate it, and it is possibly extinct. A highly distinctive pale subspecies that is overall creamy-buff with a whitish tail and brown ears. It should not be confused with true albinos, rarely recorded in the Indian giant squirrel, which are whiter and have pink eyes unlike R. i. dealbata.
- R. i. maxima: From southern Western Ghats. It resembles a large R. i. centralis, but with more extensive black in the shoulder region and on the rump, and an almost entirely black tail (no pale tip). There is often a black dorsal stripe connecting the black shoulder region and rump. Another subspecies, R. i. bengalensis, has been described from southern Karnataka and northern Kerala, in between R. i. indica and R. i. maxima. It generally resembles R. i. indica, but the tail is black except for its pale tip and sometimes it has black shoulders, thus approaching R. i. maxima or R. i. centralis. Its intermediate appearance and distribution has caused some questions about its validity; it could be regarded as an intergrade and recent authorities often treat it as a synonym of R. i. maxima.

Ratufa indica taxonomy
Subspecies	Authority	Synonyms
R. i. indica	Erxleben, 1777	bombaya, elphinstoni, purpureus, superans
R. i. centralis	Ryley, 1913	none
R. i. dealbata	Blanford, 1897	none
R. i. maxima	Schreber, 1784	bengalensis, malabarica

== Behaviour ==
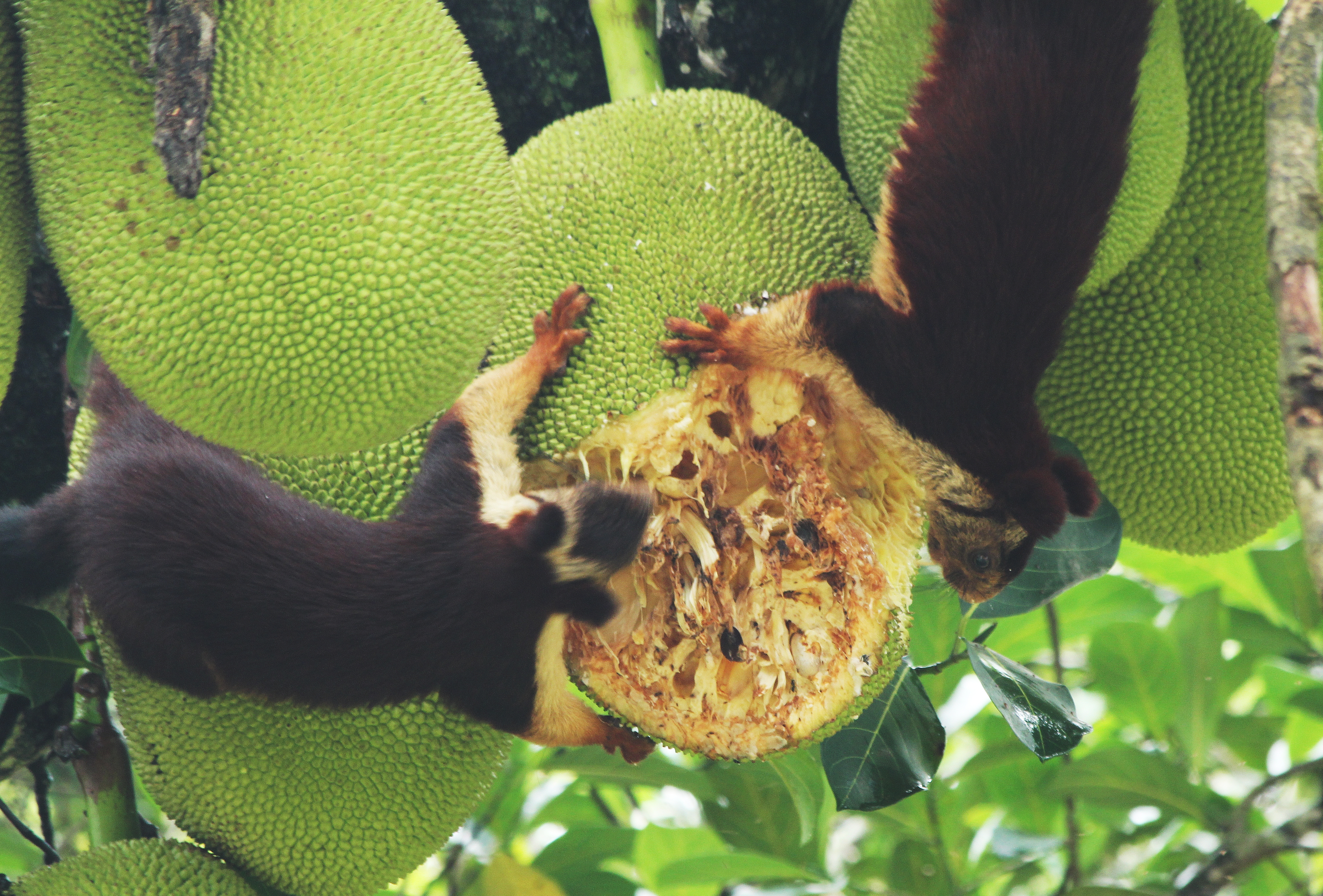
Indian giant squirrels feeding on a ripe jackfruit in Nagarhole National Park, Karnataka

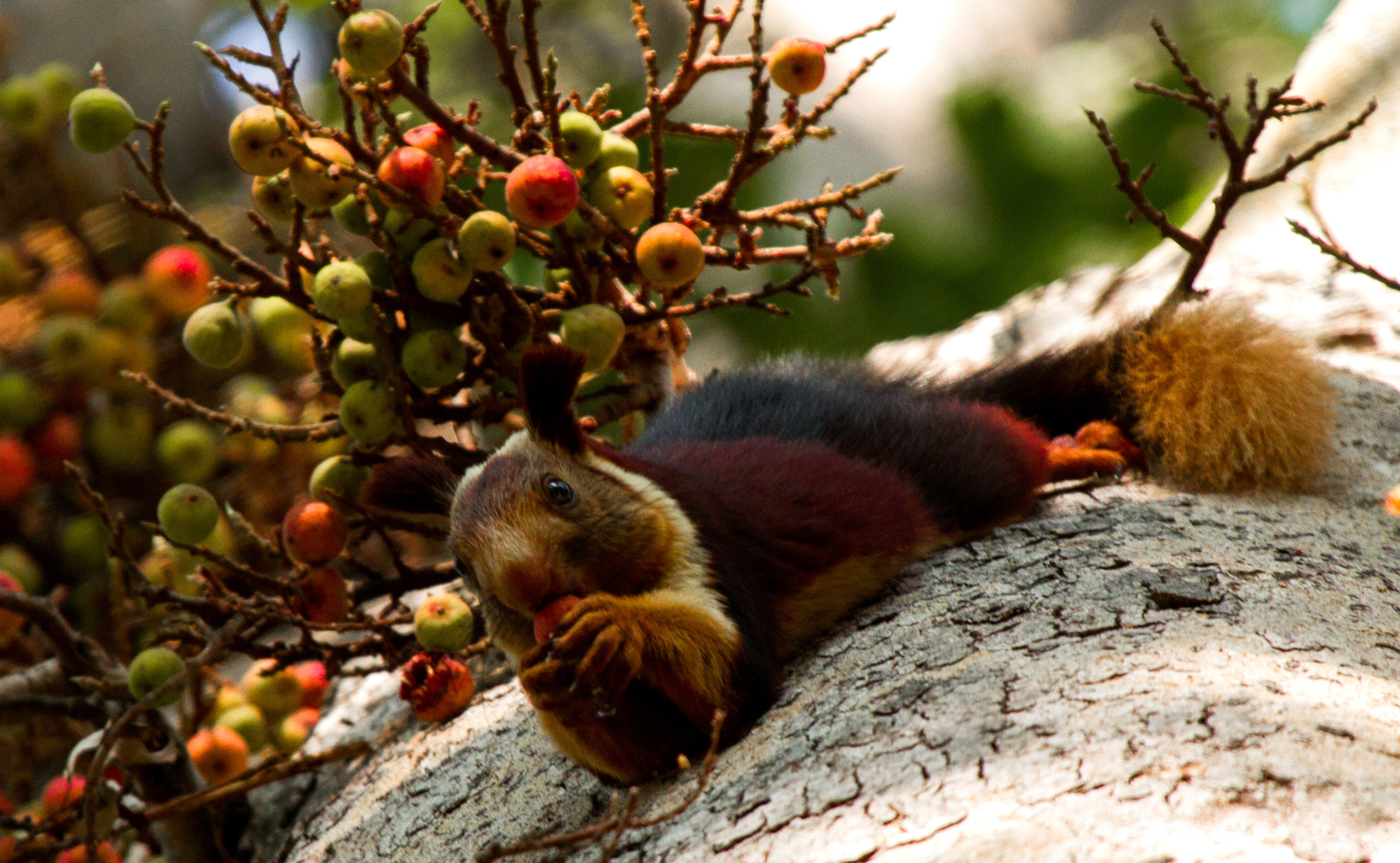
Indian giant squirrel eating a fig

The Indian giant squirrel is an upper-canopy dwelling species, which rarely leaves the trees, and requires "tall profusely branched trees for the construction of nests." It travels from tree to tree with jumps of up to 6 m (20 ft). This giant squirrel is mostly active in the early hours of the morning and in the evening, resting in the midday.

When in danger, the Indian giant squirrel often freezes or flattens itself against the tree trunk, instead of fleeing. Its main predators are the birds of prey like owls and the leopard.

The species is believed to play a substantial role in shaping the ecosystem of its habitat by engaging in seed dispersal. The diet includes fruit, flowers, nuts and tree bark. They may also consume insects and bird eggs.

=== Social behaviour ===
The Indian giant squirrel lives alone or in pairs. They are typically solitary animals that only come together for breeding. They build large globular nests of twigs and leaves, placing them on thinner branches where large predators can't get to them. These nests become conspicuous in deciduous forests during the dry season. An individual may build several nests in a small area of forest which are used as sleeping quarters, with one being used as a nursery.

=== Reproduction ===
Captive breeding of the Malayan giant squirrel, a close relative has indicated births in March, April, September and December. The young weigh 74.5 g at birth and have a length of 27.3 cm.

== Cultural impact ==
The Indian giant squirrel (shekaru in Marathi) is the state animal of the state of Maharashtra in western India.

== See also ==
- Indian giant flying squirrel
- Seshachalam Hills biosphere
