= Tawa Nagar =

Tawa Nagar Ranipur, Tavanagar
- town
- Location in Madhya Pradesh, India
- Coordinates: 22.57°N 77.96°E
- Country: India
- State: Madhya Pradesh
- District: Narmadapuram
- Elevation: 349 m (1,145 ft)

Population (2011)
  - Total: 4,561

Languages
  - Official: Hindi
- Time zone: UTC+5:30 (IST)

Tawa Nagar is a town in Madhya Pradesh state of India. It is located in near Itarsi Junction in Narmadapuram district. Itarsi is a key hub for agricultural goods and is the biggest, oldest & the busiest railway junctions in Madhya Pradesh. Rail services from all 4 major metropolitan cities of India namely Mumbai to Calcutta and Delhi to Chennai pass through Itarsi. It has Ordnance Factory Itarsi of the Ordnance Factories Board which manufactures products for the Indian Armed Forces. The Bori Wildlife Sanctuary and Tawa Dam are nearby.

Tawa

== Demographics ==
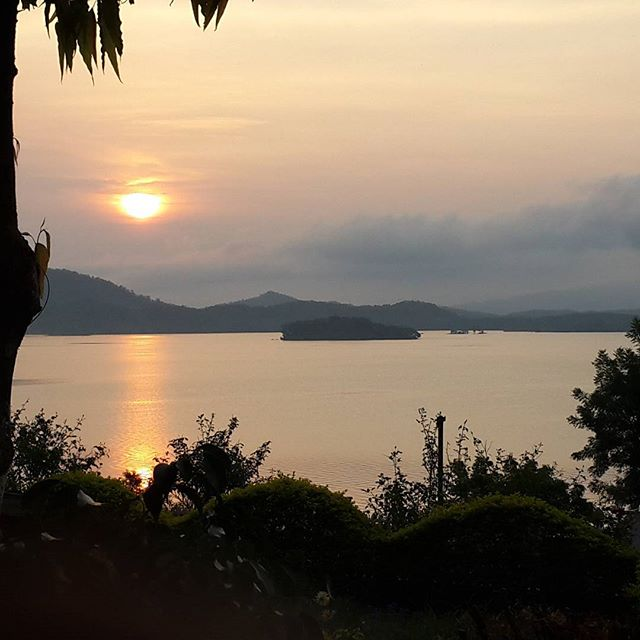
heaven s gate

Tawanagar is a very small village with population of 4561 people, consisting of 2440 males and 2121 females. Majority of people employed by Irrigation Department of Madhya Pradesh State Government.

== Geography ==
Tawanagar is surrounded by Satpura Range. It is located beside the Tawa Reservoir on the Tawa River.

== Transport ==
Anyone can reach Tawanagar it is only 30 km from itarsi and 12 km from NH-69(dhanyawaad). nearest railway station is itarsi. Itarsi is one of the major junctions in India, at the crossing of important east–west and north–south routes. Itarsi comes under West Central Railway zone whose headquarters is in Jabalpur. Itarsi is connected via broad gauge lines to Bhopal and Delhi to the north, Bhusawal and Mumbai to the west, the railway junctions of Nagpur to the south and Jabalpurto the east. Rail services from Mumbai to Guwahati and Delhi to Chennai pass through Itarsi. 250 trains are daily passing through. Itarsi runs one express train — Vindhyachal express — and it runs three passenger trains in Jabalpur route daily. Itarsi is the busy railway station in Bhopal division. The new platforms 6 and 7 opened for Jabalpur, Nagpur and Bhusawal routes.

== Education ==
In Tawanagar there two higher secondary schools, Model higher secondary (boarding) and government higher secondary school. the major role play by the model school in education it is the only school in that place where nearby villagers student come and study there, there hostels and other facilities are provided by the govt. In tawanagar only Hindi medium education are provided. Most of the students are from model school are in today Indian army, and other government post.

== Tawanagar videos ==
Tawanagar tawa resort top view drone. by Allen Webstar

== Tourism ==
Main visitor attractions in Tawa Nagar include:

- Tawa Reservoir
- Tawa Resort
- Chaurasi Baba (Sacred Place)
- Gaurishah baba mazaar
- Bori Reserve
