= Birds of the Central Indian Highlands =

The Central Highlands of India are a biogeographic region in India formed by the disjunct ranges of the Satpura and Vindhya Hills. It is given the term 6A within the Deccan zone in the Rodgers and Panwar (1988) classification. The zone adjoins 6D, the Central Plateau and 4B, the Gujarat Rajputana and extends across the states of Maharashtra, Madhya Pradesh and Chhattisgarh. The total area is approximately 250,000 km^{2} and there are 27 Protected Areas (20 Wildlife Sanctuaries and 7 National Parks) covering 4.9% of the area. There are also six Project Tiger Reserves in the region.

The Central Indian Highlands have two parallel chains of hills, namely, the Vindhyas and the Satpuras, running from East-North-East to West-South-West direction and separated by the Narmada River valley. The Vindhyas lie to the north of Narmada, extending from Jobat in Gujarat (22°27’ N; 74°35’ E) to Sasaram in Bihar (24°57’N; 84°02’E) through the Malwa Plateau and Baghelkhand (Kaimur ranges). The Satpuras stretch south of the Narmada and are composed of several contiguous ranges that include the Rajpipla Hills (sometimes considered a part of the Western Ghats), the Nimar Plateau, the Pachmarhi Hills and the Mahadeo Hills. The Maikal hills in the north-east of the region are considered to be the connecting link between these ranges. The general elevational range of the Vindhyas is between 450 and 600 m though a few points rise above 900 m. In contrast, the Satpuras are marked with higher elevation plateaus, the highest peak being Dhupgarh (1348 m). The Central Indian Highlands serve as a major watershed area for several rivers including the Narmada, Chambal, Betwa, Tons, Ken, Sone, Wainganga, Wardha, and Tapti rivers. The climate is essentially tropical and a larger part of rainfall is during the southwest monsoon (June – August). The natural vegetation of the Central Indian Highlands is dominated by the peninsular sal (Shorea robusta) forests in the east and teak (Tectona grandis) forests in the west.

Birdlife in Central Indian Highlands is generally not so rich as either Eastern Himalayas or the Western Ghats although they have been suggested to have acted as an important dispersal highway in the historical past for the Indo-Malayan elements from the Eastern Himalayas to Western Ghats and Sri Lanka (Ali, 1949). (See also Satpura hypothesis) About 430 species of birds have been reliably recorded from this region representing 61 families and 15 orders, of which 254 species breed while 104 species are winter migrants and with a few other vagrant species (Grimmett et al., 1998).

Literature on historical records of birdlife of the region is very scanty. Forsyth's (1889) casual remarks indicated that several species like black-headed yellow bulbul (Pycnonotus melanicterus), painted spurfowl (Galloperdix lunulata), lesser adjutant (Leptoptilos javanicus), and Indian golden-backed three-toed woodpecker (Dinopium javanense) which are now found only in small restricted areas were apparently quite common and widespread around late 19th century. The recent rediscovery of the forest spotted owlet (Heteroglaux blewitti), endemic to Central Indian Highlands after about 114 years (Rasmussen 1998), underscores the significance of more avifaunal studies in the region for conservation planning. The forests of central India are also one of the few known refuges for several globally threatened and restricted-range species like Malabar pied hornbill (Anthracoceros coronatus), spotted grey creeper (Salpornis spilonotus), white-bellied minivet (Pericrocotus erythropygius), Asian brown flycatcher (Muscicapa dauurica) and green munia (Amandava formosa) (Ali & Ripley, 1983). A recent survey on breeding birds of Central Indian Highlands by Wildlife Institute of India (Jayapal et al., 2005) has added several new breeding records and range-extensions like crested goshawk (Accipiter trivirgatus), Oriental scops owl (Otus sunia), spot-bellied eagle owl (Bubo nipalensis), drongo-cuckoo (Surniculus lugubris), ashy drongo (Dicrurus leucophaeus), and striated grassbird (Megalurus palustris).
