= Pipariya, Madhya Pradesh =

Town in Madhya Pradesh, India

Pipariya
- Town
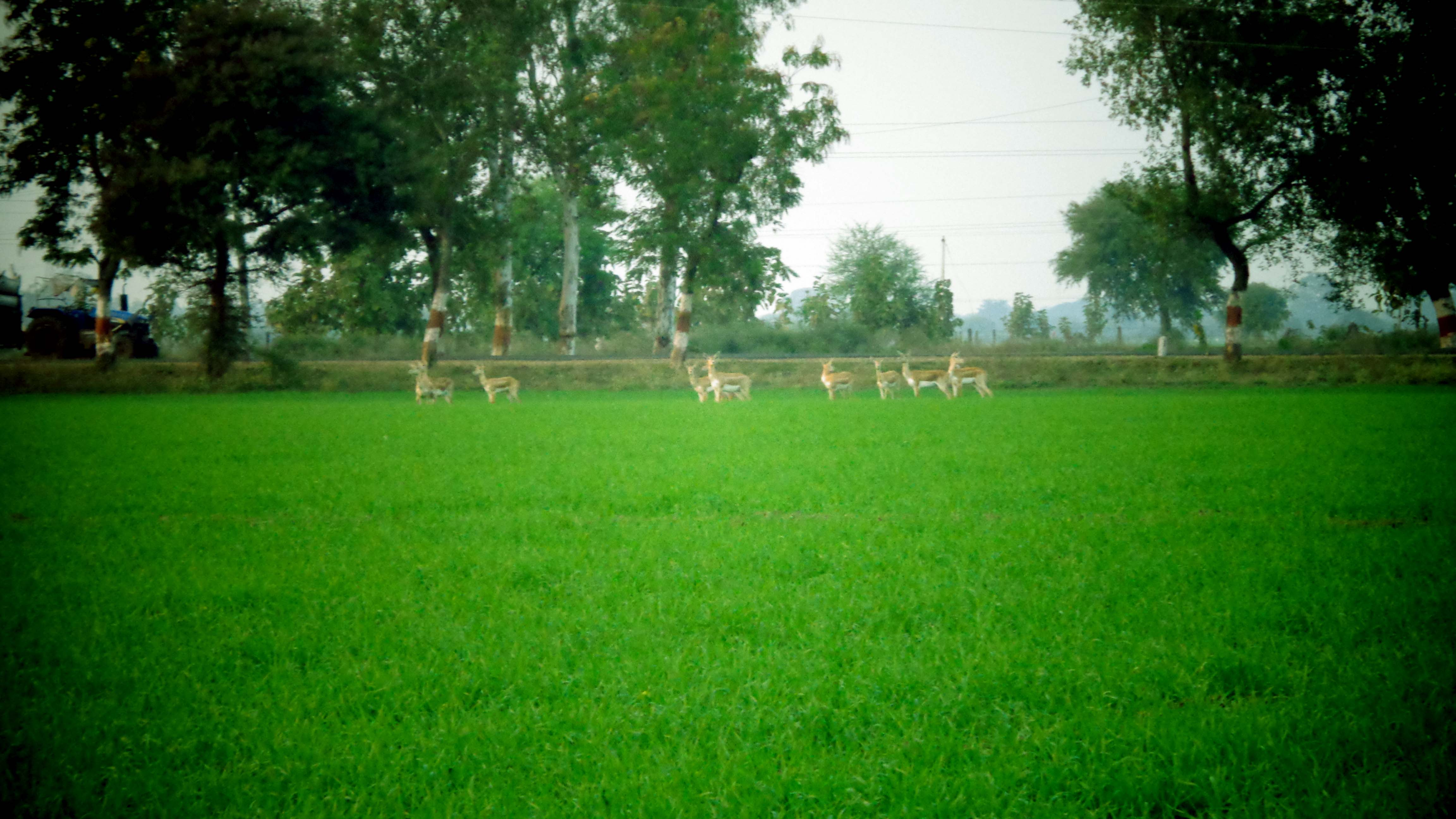
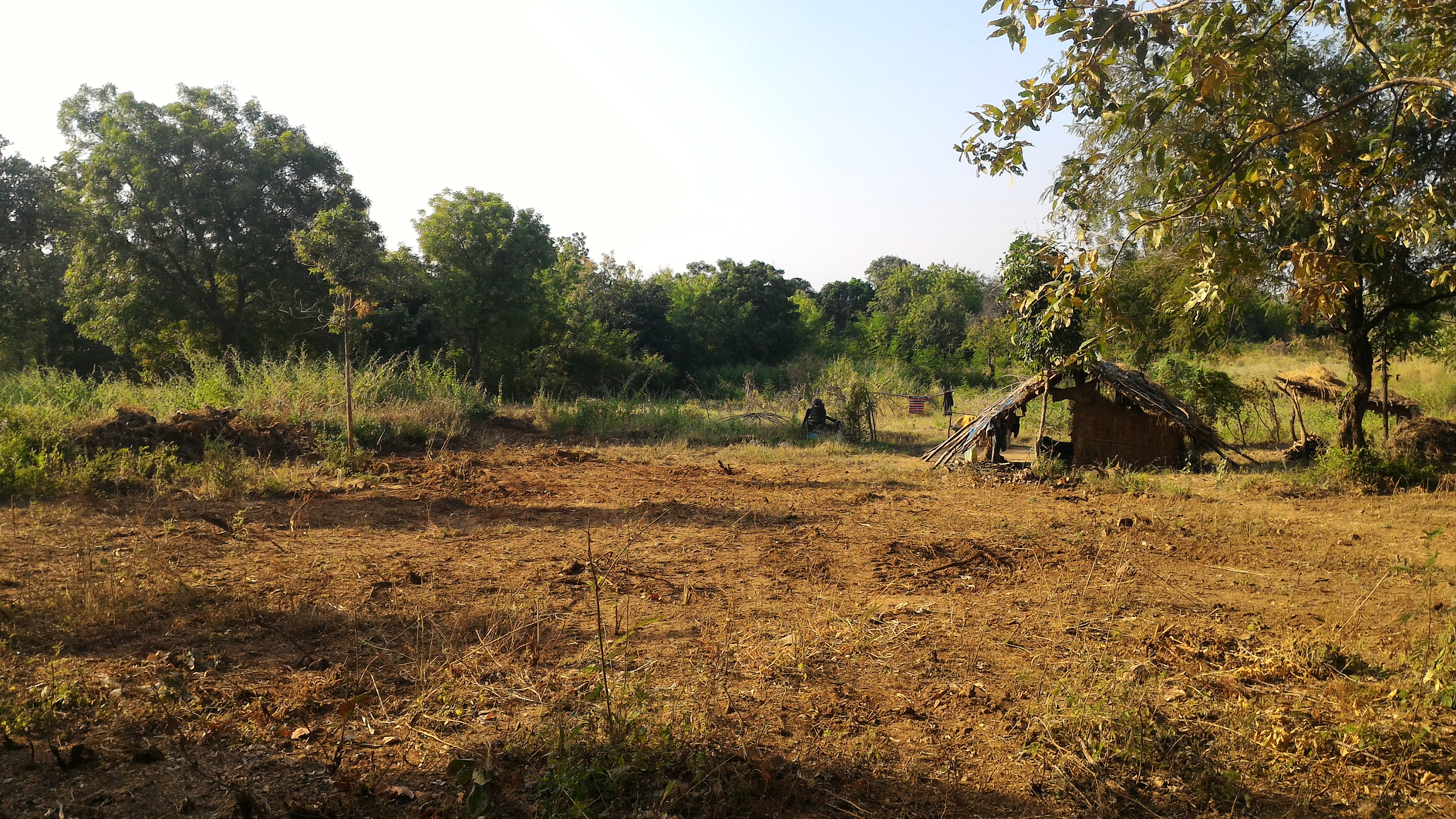
- Farms in Pipariya Beauty of pipariya

- Location in Madhya Pradesh, India Pipariya (India)
- Coordinates: 22.75°N 78.34°E
- Country: India
- State: Madhya Pradesh
- District: Hoshangabad

Government
  - Type: Municipal Council (Nagar Palika)
- Elevation: 300 m (980 ft)

Population (2011)
  - Total: 48,826

Languages
  - Official: Hindi
- Time zone: UTC+5:30 (IST)
- PIN: 461775
- ISO 3166 code: IN-MP
- Vehicle registration: MP 05

Pipariya is a town and a municipality in Hoshangabad district Indian State of Madhya Pradesh. It is also a tehsil headquarters and an Assembly constituency.

== Geography ==
Pipariya is located on 22.75°N 78.34°E. It is situated in Satpura range. Pipariya is 70 km from district headquarter Hoshangabad, while the state capital Bhopal is 155 km from the town.

== Demographics ==
As of the 2011 census of India, the Pipariya Municipality has a population of 48,826 of which 25,294 are males and 23,532 are females.

== Government ==
Pipariya is one of the 230 constituencies in the Madhya Pradesh Legislative Assembly of Madhya Pradesh, a central state of India. Pipariya is also part of Narmadapuram Lok Sabha constituency. It is a reserved seat for the Scheduled Caste (SC).

== Economy ==
Agriculture: Agriculture growth is very high of the region. The land is quite fertile and farmers have good canal irrigation facilities from the Tawa Dam throughout the year. The farmers employ rotation of crops and their major income depends on Wheat, Soya Bean, Mung Bean, Sugarcane, Gram, Paddy cultivation etc.

Industries: A food park has been established by the MP government in Pipariya where several food processing units are operated, along with several pulse mills and rice mills are located in this area. Pipariya also has the largest number of warehouse in MP.

== Education ==
There are many government schools in Pipariya which are affiliated to Madhya Pradesh Board which include boys and girls schools, there are also some private schools and institutes here.

- Government Girls College, Pipariya
- Government ITI Pipariya
- Polytechnic College, Pipariya
- Shaheed Bhagat Singh Government College

== Tourism ==
- Satpura Tiger Reserve, also known as Satpura National Park, is located in the Hoshangabad district of Madhya Pradesh in India. Its name is derived from the Satpura range.
- Dhupgarh, the Satpura Range's highest point is 1,352 m. It's well-known for its sunrise and sunset views.
- Pachmarhi is a hill station in the Hoshangabad district of Madhya Pradesh state of central India. it is widely known as Satpura ki Rani. ("Queen of Satpura").

== Transportation ==
=== Railways ===
Pipariya railway station is on the Itarsi-Jabalpur rail line and is under the Jabalpur railway division.

=== Roadway ===
Pipariya is well connected by road. It's connected Bhopal, Jabalpur, Chhindwara, Gadarwara, Panchmarhi, Narmadapuram, Itarsi by road. Daily bus service available from Pipariya.
