= Pipariya railway station =

Railway station in Madhya Pradesh

Pipariya

General information
- Location: Pipariya, Madhya Pradesh; India
- Coordinates: 22°45′14″N 78°21′19″E
- Elevation: 339 metres (1,112 ft)
- System: Indian Railway Station
- Owner: Ministry of Railways, Indian Railways
- Line: Jabalpur–Bhusaval section
- Platforms: 3
- Tracks: 3

Construction
- Structure type: Standard (On Ground)
- Parking: Yes

Other information
- Status: Functioning
- Station code: PPI
- Zone(s): West Central Railway
- Division(s): Jabalpur

History
- Opened: Yes
- Rebuilt: No
Location
- Location within India Location within Madhya Pradesh

Pipariya railway station is a railway station serving Pipariya town, in Narmadapuram district of Madhya Pradesh State of India. Pipariya is A category station of West Central Railway Zone of Indian Railways. It is under Jabalpur railway division of West Central Railway Zone of Indian Railways. It is located on Itarsi – Jabalpur main line of the Indian Railways. The railway first reached Pipariya on 7 March 1870, as part of the Great Indian Peninsula Railway (GIPR) line connecting Itarsi to Jabalpur. This development linked Mumbai and Kolkata, establishing the town as a vital railway hub in Madhya Pradesh.

The station served as the designated railhead for the military town of Pachmarhi, significantly enhancing its strategic importance in the region. Shortly after the line's inauguration, initial station infrastructure — including water supply facilities — was established. Early tea stalls began appearing at the station around 1930, reflecting its growing role as a busy transit point.

It is located at 339 m above sea level and has three platforms. As of 2016, electrified of existing double Broad Gauge railway line is in progress and at this station, 108 trains stops. Bhopal Airport, is at distance of 126 kilometers .

It is nearest railway station of Pachmarhi sanctuary and Satpura National Park.
