= Satpura Tiger Reserve =

National park in India

- IUCN category II (national park)
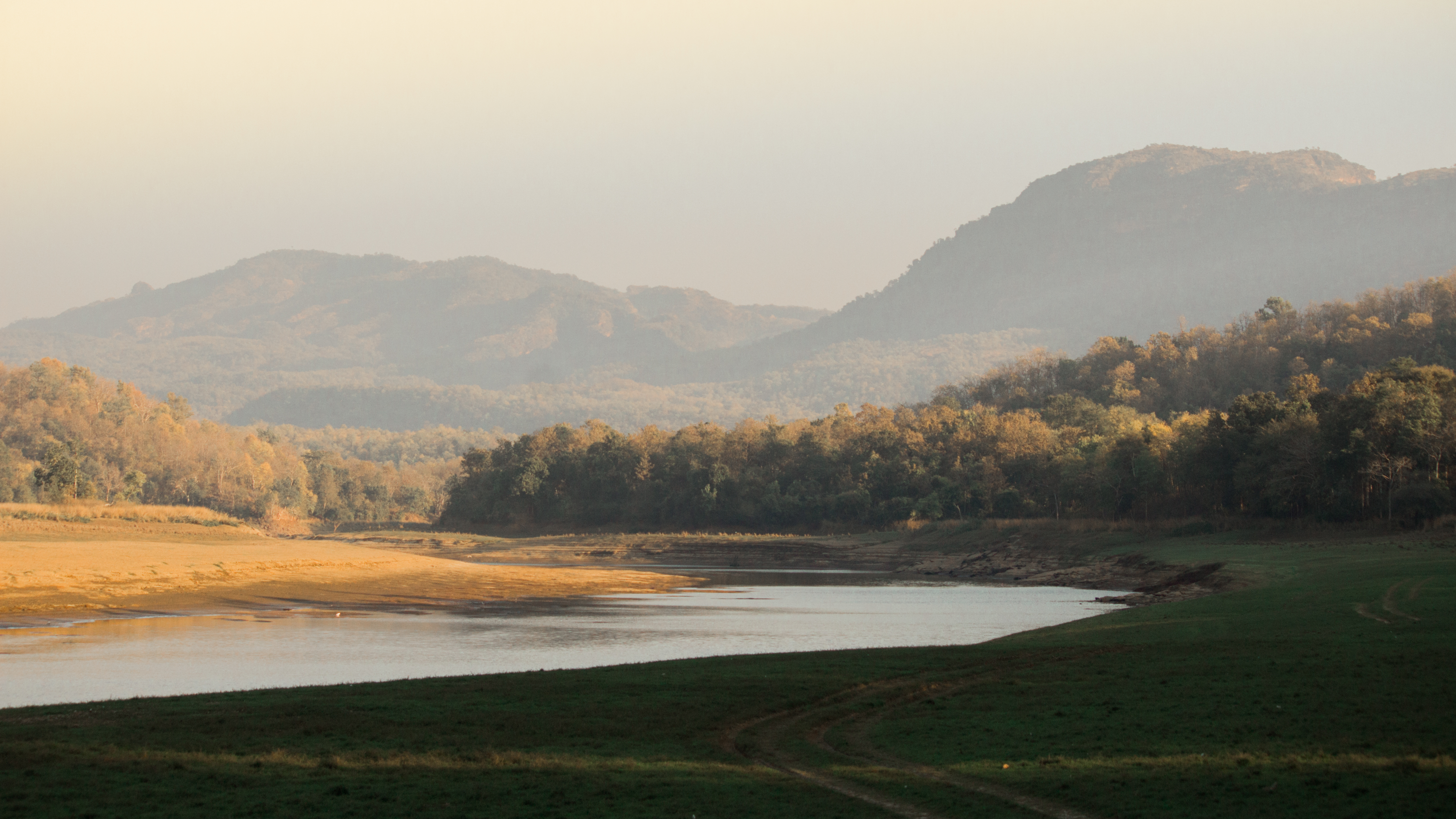
- Satpura Tiger Reserve

- Location within Madhya Pradesh Location within India
- Interactive map of Satpura Tiger Reserve
- Location: Narmadapuram, Madhya Pradesh, India
- Nearest city: Pipariya
- Coordinates: 22°29′42″N 78°13′52″E
- Area: 2,133 km^{2} (824 sq mi)
- Established: 2000 (as Tiger Reserve)
- Governing body: Ministry of Environment, Forest and Climate Change, Madhya Pradesh Forest Department
- Website: satpuratigerreserve.org

Satpura Tiger Reserve is a tiger reserve located in the Narmadapuram district of Madhya Pradesh in India. Its name is derived from the Satpura range. It covers a total area of 2,133.31 km^{2} (823.68 sq mi), comprising a 1,339.26 km^{2} (517.09 sq mi) core zone and a 794.04 km^{2} (306.58 sq mi) buffer zone, in the central Indian highlands. It was declared a tiger reserve in 2000. It is rich in plants and wild animals.

== History ==
Satpura Tiger Reserve is named after the Satpura Range. Satpura is a Sanskrit word, that means seven mountains (sapta – seven and pura – mountain). The area was first explored by Captain James Forsyth in 1862, while he was searching for the Indian freedom fighter Tatya Tope. It is one of the first declared Reserved Forest Areas of India due to its ecological and commercial importance. It became a tiger reserve in 2000.

== Geography ==
Satpura Tiger Reserve is located in the Narmadapuram district of Madhya Pradesh in India. It covers a total area of 2,133.31 km^{2} (823.68 sq mi), comprising a core zone of 1,339.26 km^{2} (517.09 sq mi) and a buffer zone of 794.04 km^{2} (306.58 sq mi). The core comprises Satpura National Park (483.88 km^{2} (186.83 sq mi)), Bori Wildlife Sanctuary (437.79 km^{2} (169.03 sq mi)) and Pachmarhi Wildlife Sanctuary (417.58 km^{2} (161.23 sq mi)). Satpura National Park was set up in 1981. The terrain of the national park is rugged and consists of sandstone peaks, narrow gorges, ravines and dense forests. The elevation ranges from 300 to 1,352 m (984 to 4,436 ft), with Dhoopgarh peak being 1,350 m (4,430 ft) and the almost level plains of Churna. Tawa River flows through the park and Tawa reservoir has been built on this rivers.

=== Climate ===
Satpura National Park experiences summer season from March to June and during this time temperature reaches 30 °C in morning hours and 40 °C in day-time. May and June months are of peak summer time with heat waves but in higher regions the temperature remains low. Monsoon arrives in July month and lasts till September or October months. The average rainfall in the region is about 1300–1700 mm. Winter season can be experienced from November to February during which temperature dips to 4 °C in morning hours around Pachmarhi Plateau and 15 °C in daytime. The lowest temperature is recorded as low as 1 degree in Pachmarhi. The winters are generally bright and cloudless with light showers in early November.

== Flora ==
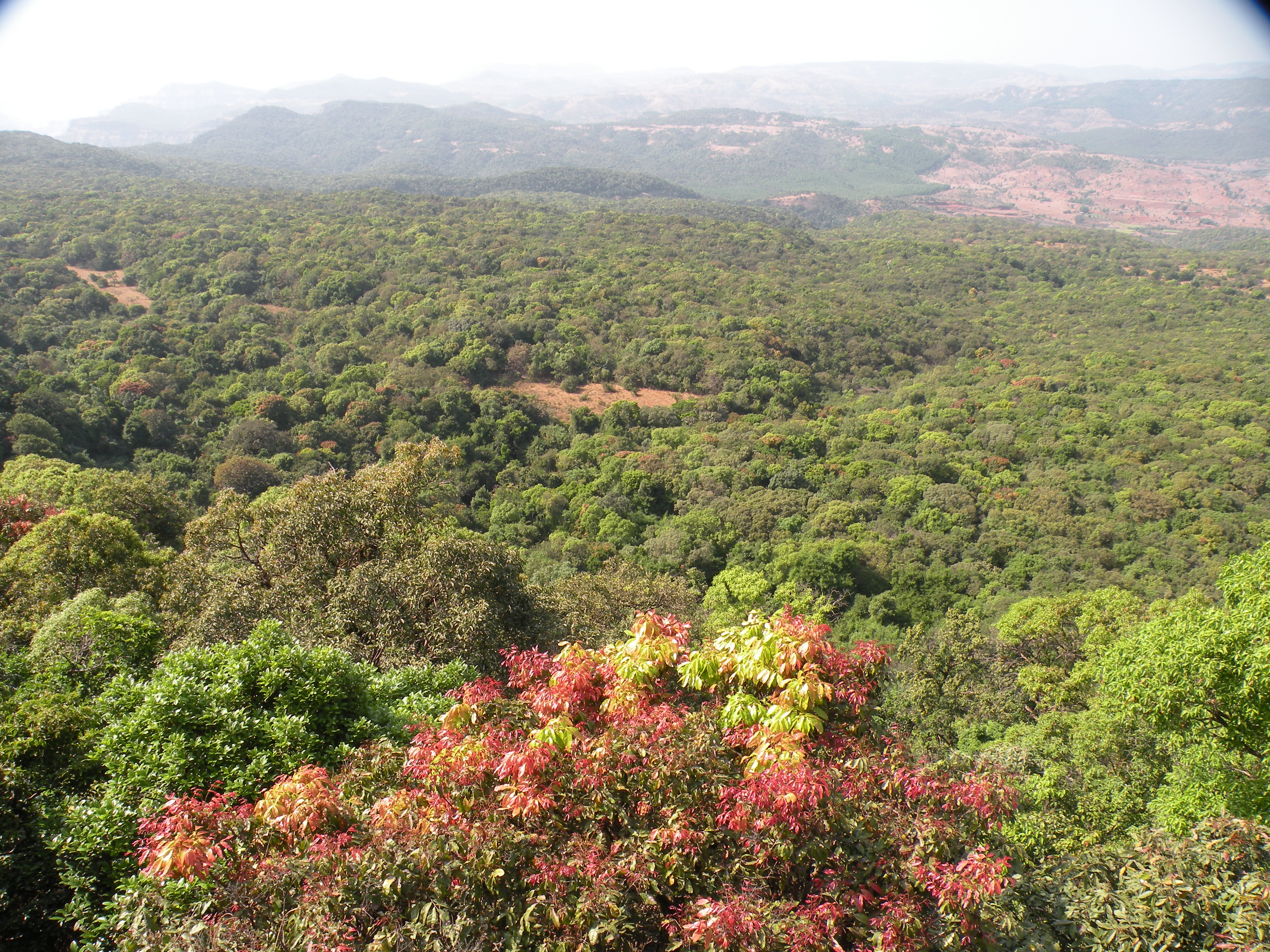
View in Satpura

Satpura Tiger Reserve is a part of a Central Indian forest ecosystem and rich in biodiversity. Satpura Tiger Reserve has over 1300 species of plants including sal, teak, tendu, Phyllanthus emblica, mahua, bel, bamboo and medicinal plants. Satpura Tiger Reserve has more than 62 trees species, 30 small tree species, 58 shrubs species, 32 climber species and almost 64 grass species. It also has important medicinal plants and rare endemic plants from the genus Psilotum, Cyathea, Osmunda, Lycopodium, and Lygodium. Saal is the most prominent flora of the National Park which is mainly found in the Pachmarhi plateau. The lower plains on the northern side of the park mainly consist of teak forest on basaltic traps. Many species like Melastoma malabathricum, Murraya paniculata, Holmskioldia senguinea, Blumea lanceolaria, and Sophora interrupta are found only in Satpura Tiger Reserve in Madhya Pradesh.

Satpura Tiger Reserve has about 10% of the area which is classified as grasslands including natural blanks on Pachmarhi plateau, anthropogenic grassland due to relocation of villages and draw down areas of Tawa reservoir. These grasslands are named Neemghan, Madai, Keria, Dhain, and Geetkheda. In addition to these, some of the new grasslands have been created by relocation of 23 villages from the core area of the reserve. Mostly all the available grasslands are of anthropogenic origin and are subjected to agriculture and grazing. If these grasslands are not manipulated, they will be invaded by woody plants and eventually disappear. Protection and maintenance is done for these grasslands to support a size-able population of herbivores by the Satpura Tiger Reserve administration.

== Fauna ==
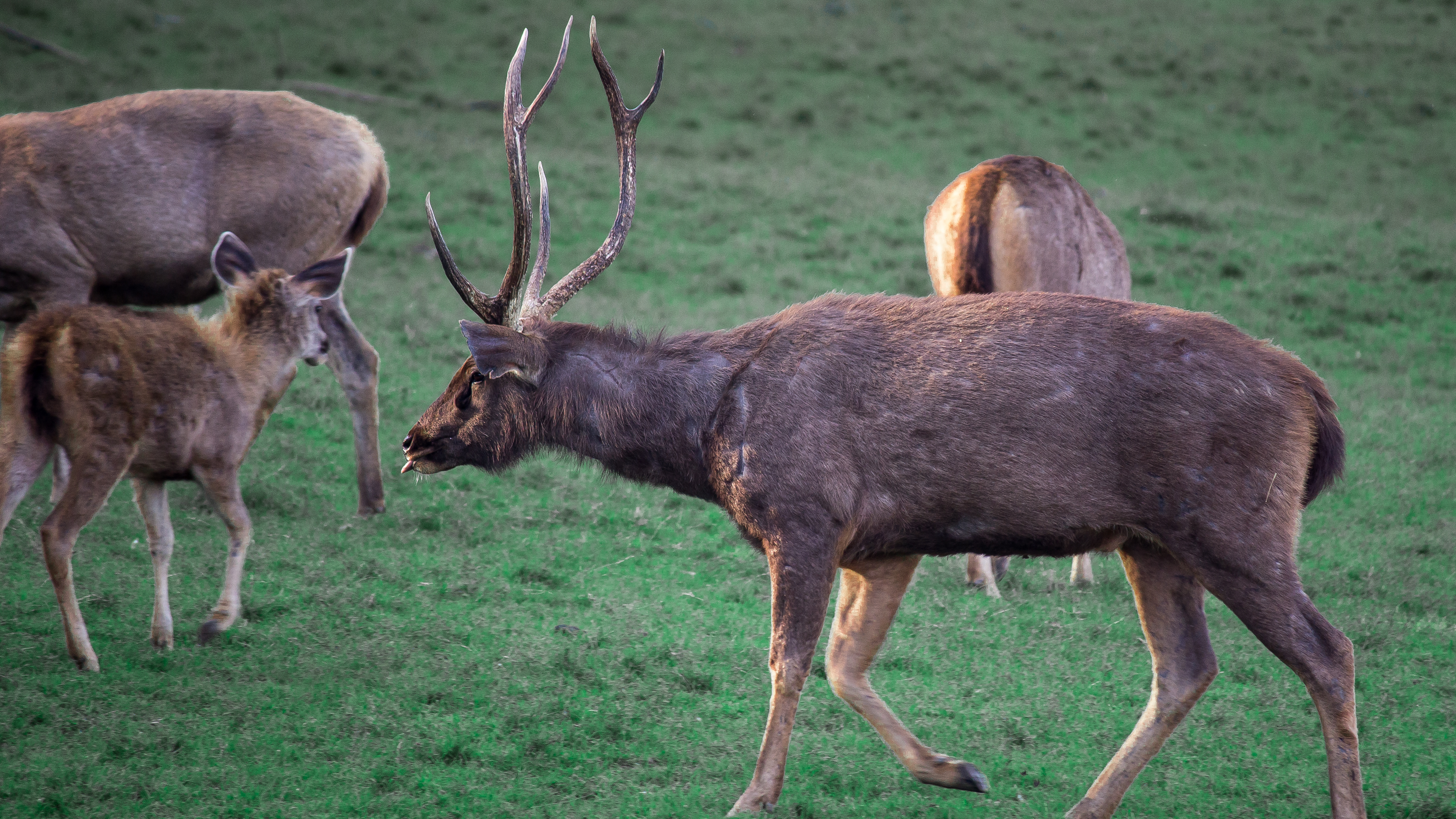
Sambar deer herd

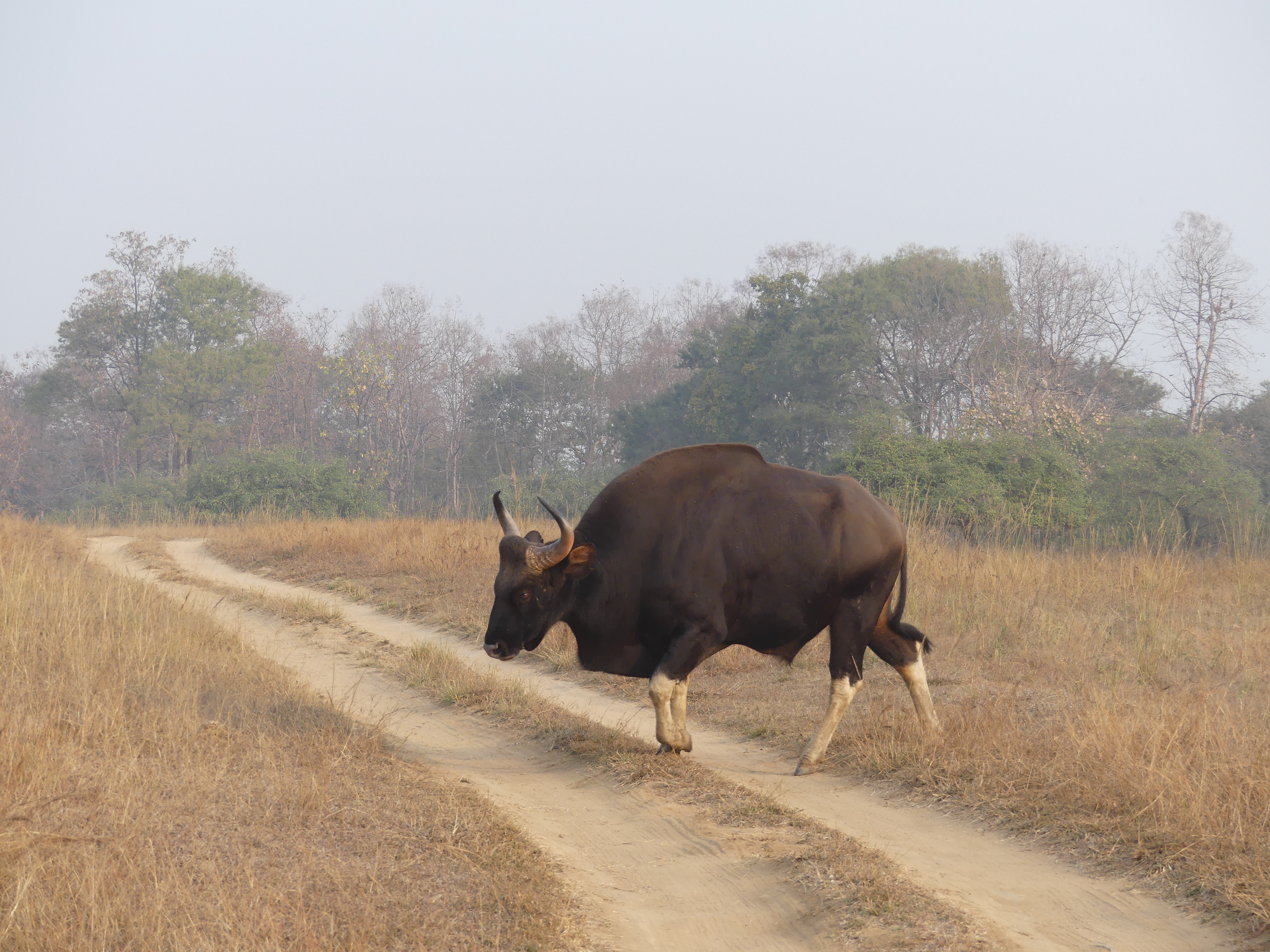
A gaur bull

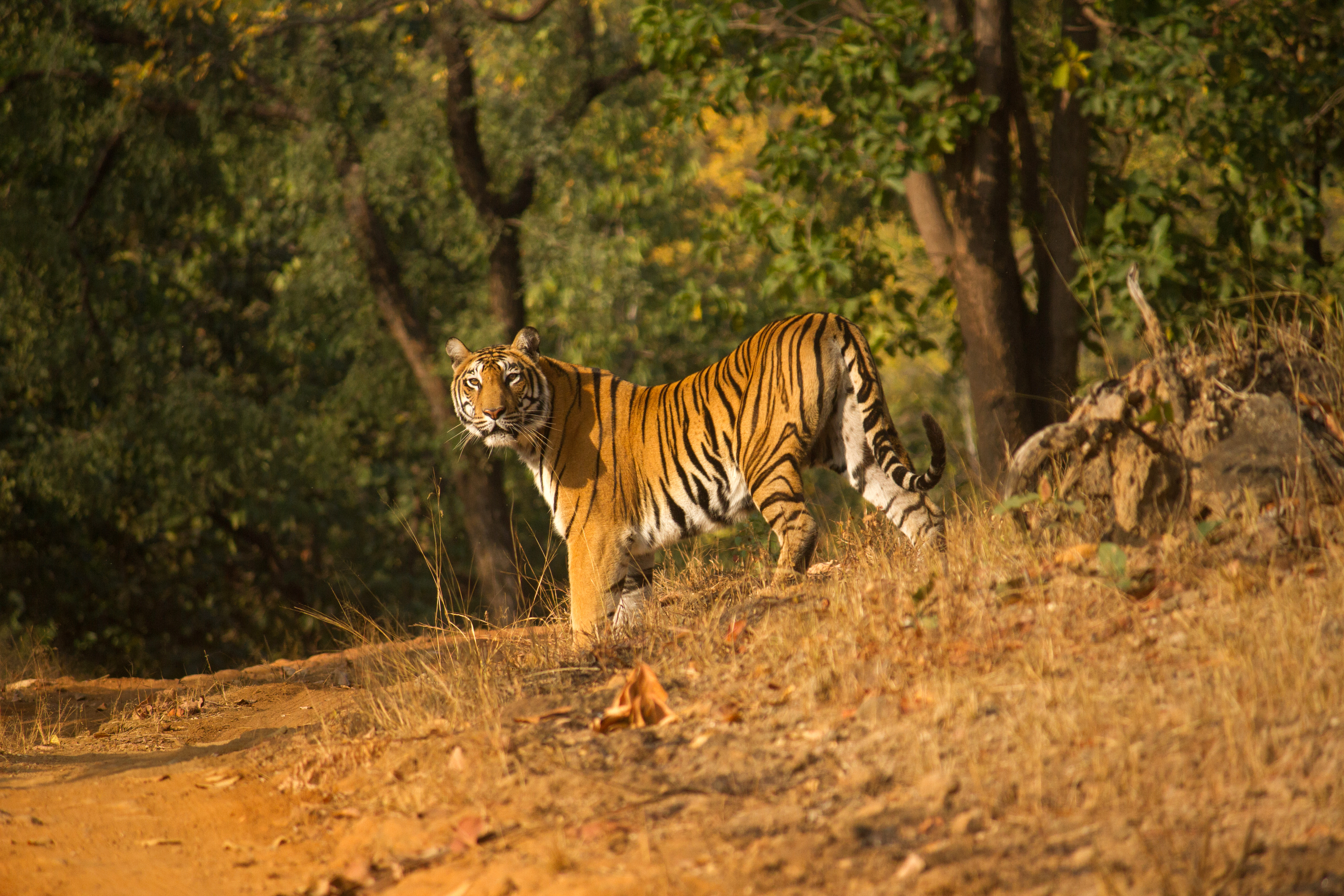
A tiger in Satpura

Satpura national park, along with its surrounding buffer-zone area have a large and diversified population of wildlife. This forest area is unique in its ecosystem and has a long history of wildlife conservation. There are 50 species of mammals, 254 species of birds, 30 species of reptiles, and 50 species of butterflies that are found in the park.

Satpura hosts various species of fauna including Spotted deer, sambhar, gaur, Nilgai, Indian muntjac, four-horned antelope, chinkara, black buck, barasingha, mouse deer, tigers, leopards, wild boar, dholes, sloth bear, Porcupine, Pangolin, Indian Giant squirrel, Flying squirrels, Rhesus monkeys, langurs and Marsh crocodile.

In 2015, 98 Barasingha were reintroduced to Satpura Tiger Reserve from Kanha Tiger Reserve. In 2024, there were 200 Barasingha in Satpura Tiger Reserve.

=== Bird ===
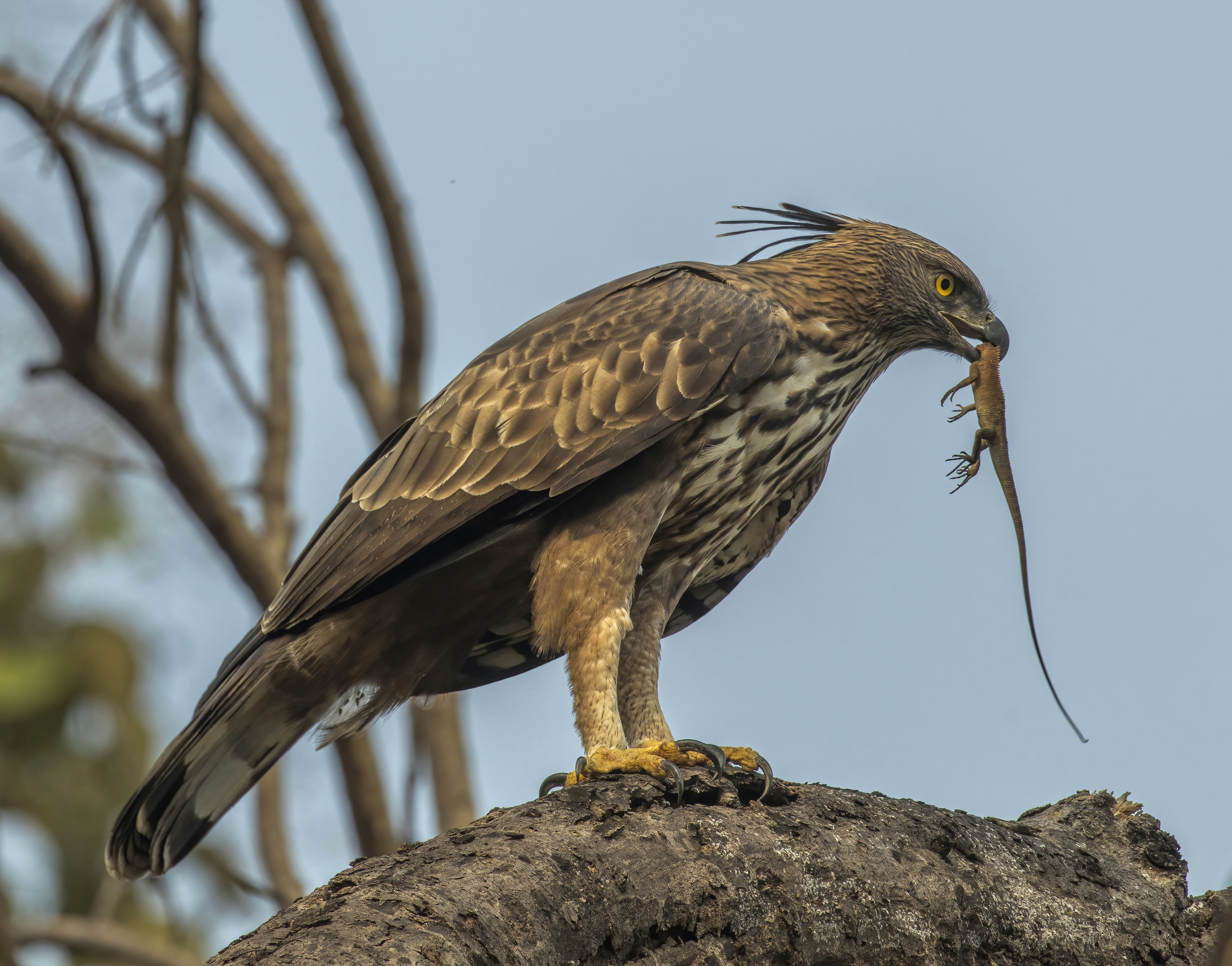
Crested hawk-eagle

Satpura Tiger Reserve is home to many birds species including Hornbill, peafowl, Pigeon hawks, crested serpent eagle, owls, crow pheasants, Malabar whistling Thrush, Paradise Fly-catcher, Honey Buzzard, Malabar pied Hornbill. There is presence of wide variety of flower species and moist conditions thus are ideal conditions for various butterfly species to flourish like Oakleaf, Black Rajah, Great Eggfly.

== See also ==
- Wildlife of India
