= Tawa Reservoir =

- Location within Madhya Pradesh Location within India
- Location: Itarsi, Narmadapuram District, Madhya Pradesh
- Coordinates: 22°33′44″N 77°58′38″E
- Type: Artificial, Created by the Government of Madhya Pradesh, India (Tawa Dam)
- Catchment area: 5,982.9 km^{2} (2,310.0 sq mi)
- Basin countries: India
- Surface area: 225 km^{2} (87 sq mi)
- Water volume: 1.944 km^{3} (1,576,000 acre⋅ft)

Tawa Dam
- Interactive map of Tawa Dam
- Location: Tawanagar, Itarsi, Narmadapuram District, Madhya Pradesh
- Construction began: 1956
- Opening date: 1974
- Operators: Water Resources Department, Madhya Pradesh

Dam and spillways
- Impounds: Tawa River
- Height: 57.91 m (190.0 ft)
- Length: 1,815 m (5,955 ft)
- Spillway capacity: 20,500 m^{3}/s (720,000 cu ft/s)

Reservoir
- Creates: Tawa Reservoir

Tawa Reservoir is a reservoir on the Tawa River in central India. It is located in Itarsi of Narmadapuram District of Madhya Pradesh state. The reservoir was formed by the construction of the Tawa Dam, which began in 1958 and was completed in 1978. The dam provides irrigation to farm lands in Narmadapuram and Harda districts. It is also a tourist attraction during the monsoon months. It was designated as a Ramsar site of national importance in 2024.

Tawa Reservoir forms the western boundary of Satpura National Park and Bori Wildlife Sanctuary.

== The power plant ==
It is a small hydropower plant which was set up on the left bank to utilize the tailrace water for irrigation purpose.

It is a private sector hydro-electric generation power plant. The two units of 2 × 6.75 MW were set up by LNJ Bhilwara group. The generated power is supplied to HEG Plant Mandideep via MPPTCL Power Line.

The power production in this plant was started in 1998.

The construction of project was completed in record time of 22 months and at a cost of about Rs. 65 crore. The early and efficient completion of this dam was made possible by RSWI, Canada.

Contact and other details pertaining to the Tawa Reservoir are available on the Government of Madhya Pradesh's Water Resources Department Website.

== Technical details ==
It is a canal head project. Catchment area spreads over approximately 6000 km^{2}. Full reservoir level (FRL) is 335.397 cubic metres (11,844.4 cu ft). Head range 7 to 21 m and discharge varying from 25 to 54 Cumecs.

Two turbo generators 6.75 MW rated capacity (20% overload).

== Machinery and equipment ==
- Vertical shaft Kaplan turbines and auxiliaries
- 11 kV semi umbrella synchronous generator and auxiliaries
- 33 kV vacuum circuit breakers.
- 1 MV 33 kV / 415 V auxiliary transformer
- Fire protection system
- 110 DC with battery backup

== History ==
The Tawa Dam had been built by the Madhya Pradesh government on the Tawa river in the 1970s to ensure enough water supply and hydropower to millions of people in the state. The dam was made under the leadership of late Shri Vinay Kumar Diwan. He was also known as Denva Ke Gandhi for his work for public welfare. He was a public representative in the region for almost two decades serving as MLA. But, while the Dam was being built, the oustees were not resettled properly. They were given only Rs. 75 - 150 for an acre of land and were resettled just on higher ground without the adequate supplies that were promised by the Indian Government.

Over the years, the oustees lost their fishing rights. The Government took over fishing rights indefinitely. Later, the private sector got hold of the rights and threatened to kill the villagers. They fished recklessly to maximise their profits, while also policing the reservoir with hired bodyguards. So, a self-help co-operative was formed by the oustees. It was called the Tawa Matsya Sangh. They later got fishing rights and sustainably regrew the fish population that was destroyed by corporate companies, along with making a bit of profit for the benefit of the members.

Ironically, the group had to pay Rs. 12 lakh to the Govt to fish on their own land each year. Later, in 2006, the Government snatched away the rights due to its growing commercial importance. Later, a Government reserve took over the rights to protect the fish.

Enraged, the oustees fought for their rights in the Supreme Court, citing that they grew the fish there and had been sustainably fishing there for about a decade. Eventually, they lost the case and now the Tawa Reserve is protected from poaching.

It is now currently a popular tourist destination during the monsoon months. A cruise boat service has been started by the tourism department for visitors to the dam and reservoir.
