= Ghatbori =

- Village
- Interactive map of Ghatbori
- Coordinates: 20°18′59″N 76°41′53″E
- Country: India
- State: Maharashtra

Ghatbori is a village in Maharashtra state, India. It is surrounded by hills of the Satpura Range. The village has facilities for gathering, including a meeting hall, marketplace, seven temples, and gymnasium.

Residents of the village come from more than 50 ethnicities, and live in homogeneous groups. The common language for communication is Marathi; other languages spoken include Hindi, Urdu, Banjari, and Marwari.

The majority of citizens are farmers who grow soybeans, mung beans, and cotton, though there is a professional class resident.
