= Pachmarhi =

- Hill station
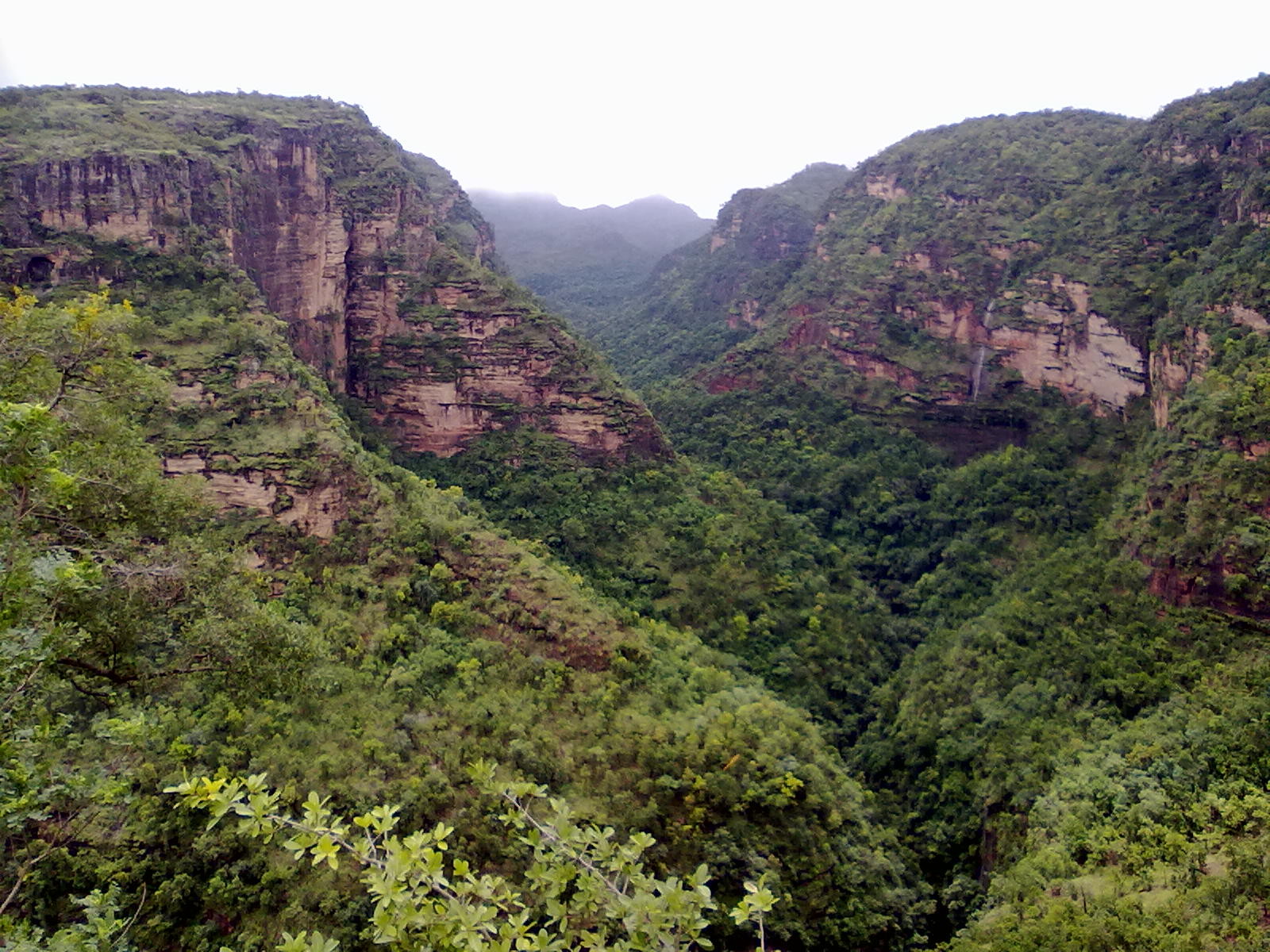
- Handi Khoh Pachmarhi
- Nickname: Queen of Satpura
- Location within Madhya Pradesh Location within India
- Coordinates: 22.4667°N 78.4110°E
- Country: India
- State: Madhya Pradesh
- District: Hoshangabad
- Elevation: 1,067 m (3,501 ft)

Languages
  - Official: Hindi
- Time zone: UTC+5:30 (IST)
- PIN: 461881
- Telephone code: +91 7578
- Vehicle registration: MP-05
- Nearest city: Pipariya

Pachmarhi is a hill station in Madhya Pradesh state of central India. It has been the location of a cantonment (Pachmarhi Cantonment) since the British Raj. The municipality is located in a valley of the Satpura Range and is widely known as Satpura ki Rani. ("Queen of Satpura")

Pachmarhi has an altitude of 1,067 meters above sea level. It is the highest peak of Mahadeo Hills of Satpura range in Madhya Pradesh. The town is wholly located within the Pachmarhi Biosphere Reserve and the Satpura Tiger Reserve.

== History ==
Pachmarhi contains several caves including hilltop caves. The community's name is believed to be derived from the Hindi words Panch ("five") and Marhi ("caves"). According to a legend, these caves were built by five Pandava brothers of Mahabharatha era during their thirteen years of exile

The region was part of the Bhonsle Kingdom and was later ruled by the Marathas in the 18th century.

It was later part of the Gondi kingdom of Bhagvat Singh in the 19th century, although there was no permanent settlement at that time. The origins of modern Panchmarhi can be traced back to 1857, when Captain James Forsyth of the British Army and Subhedar Major Nathoo Ramji Powar noticed the plateau while en route to Jhansi. It quickly developed into a hill station and sanatorium for British troops in the Central Provinces of India, and Powar was made Kotwal (a person in charge of the armoury).

In 1901, the year-round population was 3,020, with a population of double this number during the hot summer months. Pachmarhi served as the summer capital for the Central Provinces.

UNESCO added the Pachmarhi area to its list of Biosphere Reserves in May 2009, due to the many rare plant species in the vicinity. The total area of Pachmarhi Biosphere Reserve is 4981.72 km^{2,} and it is located at latitude 22° 11’ to 22° 50’N and longitude 77° 47’ to 78° 52’E. The reserve spans parts of three civil districts: Hoshangabad (59.55%), Chhindwara (29.19%) and Betul (11.26%). It includes three wildlife conservation units: Bori Sanctuary 485.72 km^{2}), Satpura National Park (524.37 km^{2}) and Pachmarhi Sanctuary (491.63 km^{2}).

== Town ==
Pachmarhi is a small community, and most of its land area is under the administration of the Pachmarhi Cantonment Board, which serves the Indian Army. The Indian Army Education Corps (AEC) are located in the community.

As of 2011 Indian census, Pachmarhi had a population of about 12,062. Most are employed by the army, or in forestry or tourism industries.

An airstrip and helipad located between the town and the mountain of Dhupgarh. The airstrip has been described as being seldom used, overrun with grass, and frequented by wild animals such as tigers and bison.

== Climate ==
Pachmarhi's climate is mild, with temperatures ranging from warm to cool, with a Köppen and Geiger classification of Cwa (humid subtropical). Summers have significantly more rainfall than winters. The town's average temperature is 21.7 °C, and the average annual rainfall in is 2012 millimeters. May is the hottest month of the year, with an average temperature of 30.3 °C, while December is the coldest month of the year, with an average temperature of 15.5 °C.

Climate data for Pachmarhi (1991-2020)
Month	Jan	Feb	Mar	Apr	May	Jun	Jul	Aug	Sep	Oct	Nov	Dec	Year
Record high °C (°F)	30.6 (87.1)	31.6 (88.9)	35.3 (95.5)	40.0 (104.0)	40.6 (105.1)	40.6 (105.1)	35.6 (96.1)	31.0 (87.8)	31.4 (88.5)	31.9 (89.4)	31.2 (88.2)	29.4 (84.9)	40.6 (105.1)
Mean daily maximum °C (°F)	20.6 (69.1)	24.0 (75.2)	29.1 (84.4)	32.8 (91.0)	35.3 (95.5)	30.7 (87.3)	25.7 (78.3)	24.1 (75.4)	26.1 (79.0)	26.9 (80.4)	24.4 (75.9)	23.0 (73.4)	27.0 (80.6)
Mean daily minimum °C (°F)	6.4 (43.5)	9.0 (48.2)	13.4 (56.1)	18.2 (64.8)	23.0 (73.4)	21.9 (71.4)	20.0 (68.0)	19.5 (67.1)	18.8 (65.8)	14.5 (58.1)	10.4 (50.7)	6.9 (44.4)	15.5 (59.9)
Record low °C (°F)	−2.8 (27.0)	−0.6 (30.9)	3.3 (37.9)	8.9 (48.0)	13.0 (55.4)	15.2 (59.4)	12.2 (54.0)	13.4 (56.1)	12.4 (54.3)	6.7 (44.1)	1.3 (34.3)	−1.5 (29.3)	−2.8 (27.0)
Average rainfall mm (inches)	8.3 (0.33)	11.9 (0.47)	10.4 (0.41)	55.2 (2.17)	18.6 (0.73)	156.3 (6.15)	503.3 (19.81)	516.4 (20.33)	236.6 (9.31)	31.2 (1.23)	28.0 (1.10)	5.5 (0.22)	1,581.7 (62.27)
Average rainy days	1.0	1.0	1.0	0.8	2.0	8.7	18.9	18.9	10.2	2.0	2.0	0.3	66.7
Average relative humidity (%) (at 17:30 IST)	53	45	27	31	28	55	85	90	81	69	69	64	59
Source: India Meteorological Department

== Tourism ==
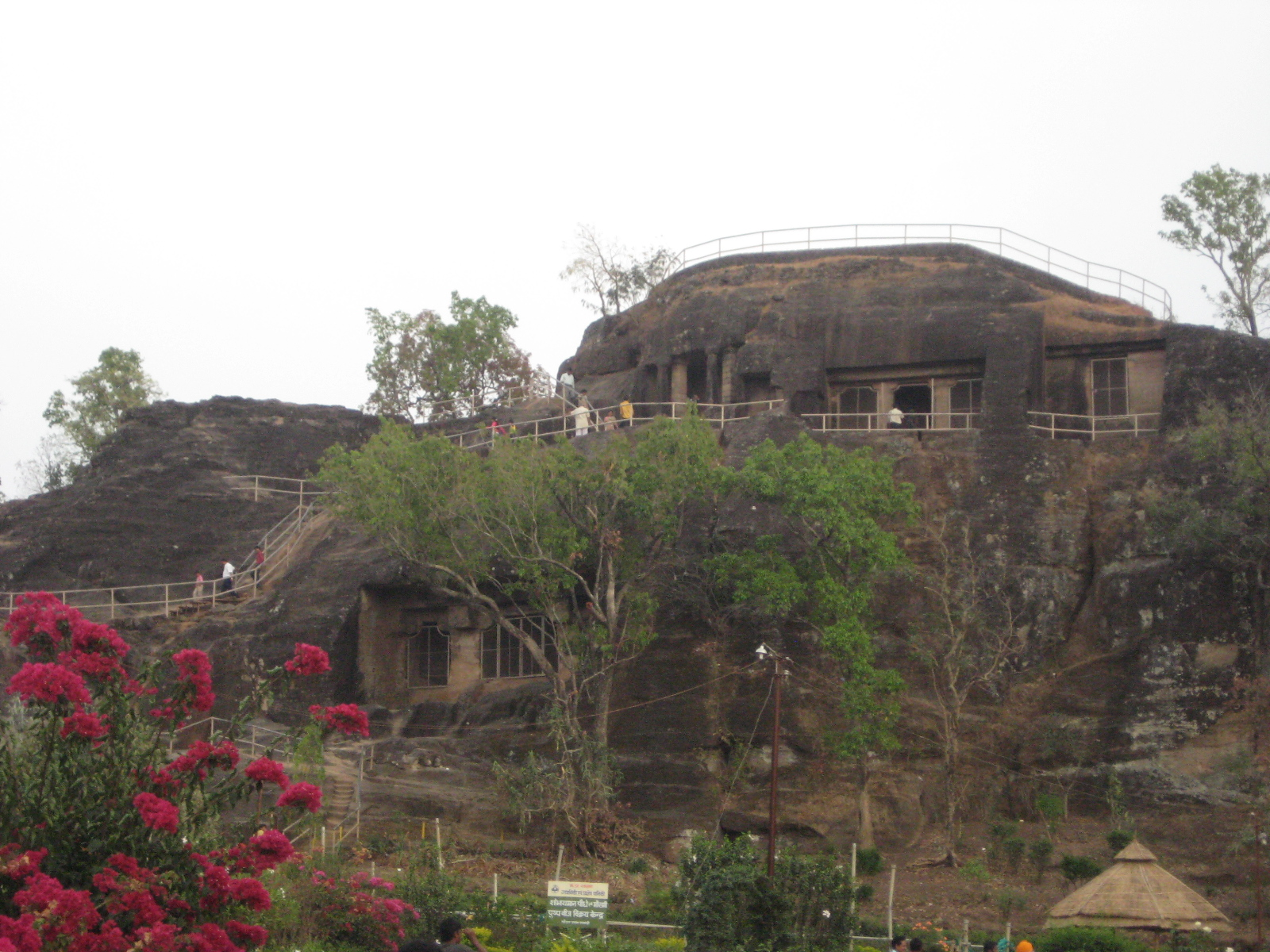
Pandav Caves Pachmarhi

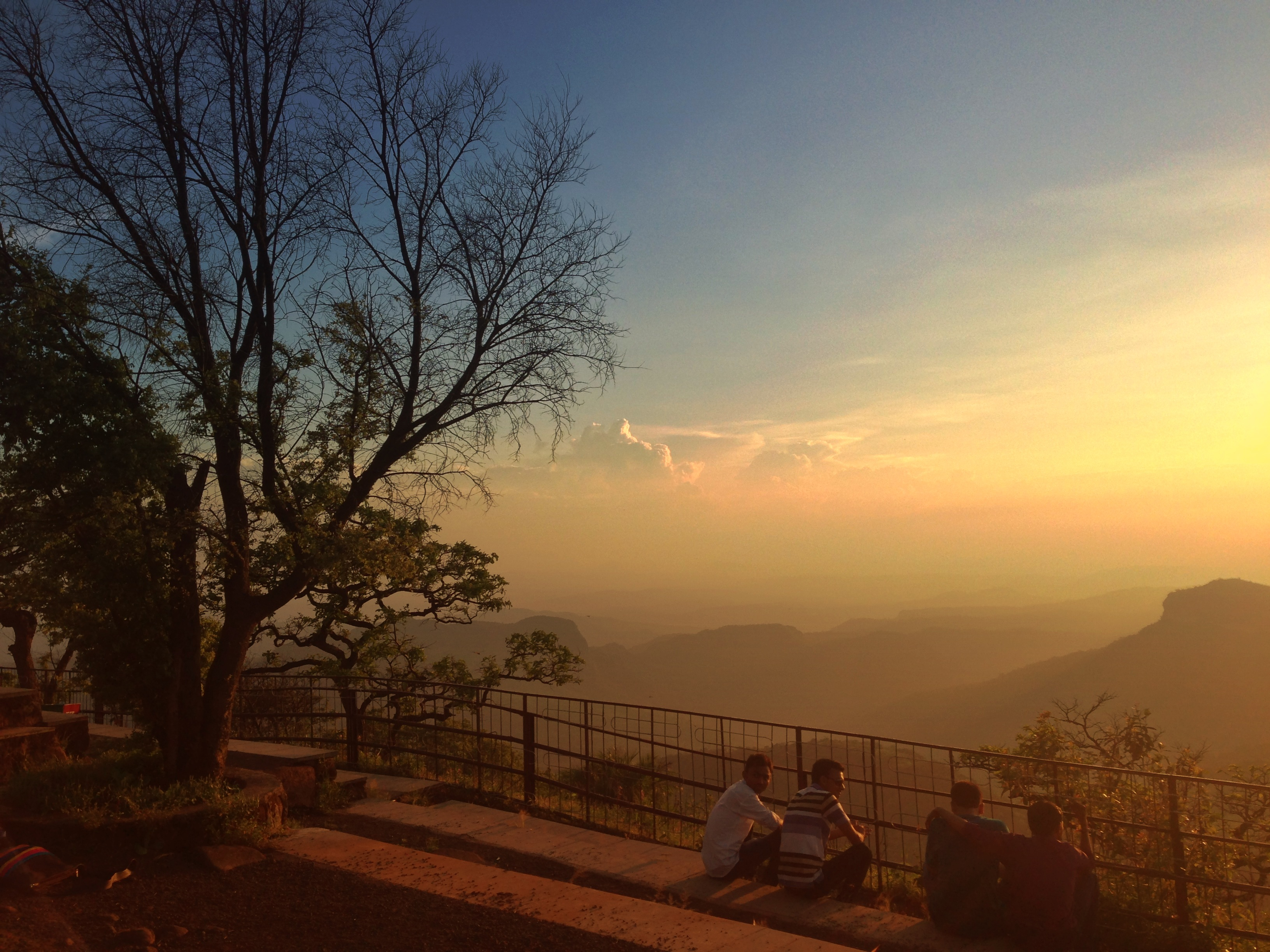
Sunset Point at Pachmarhi

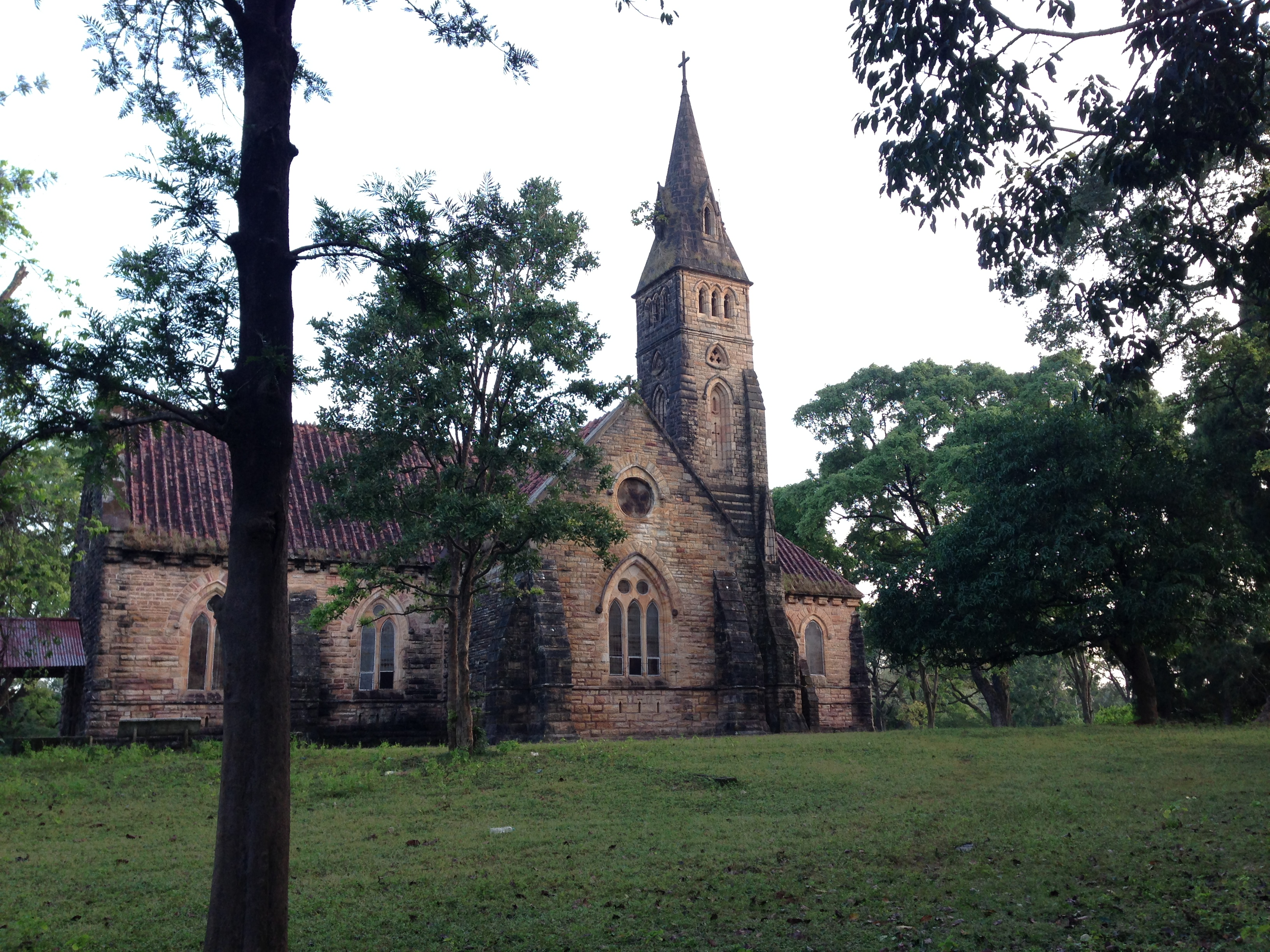
Anglican Church at Pachmarhi was built around 1875 by the British.

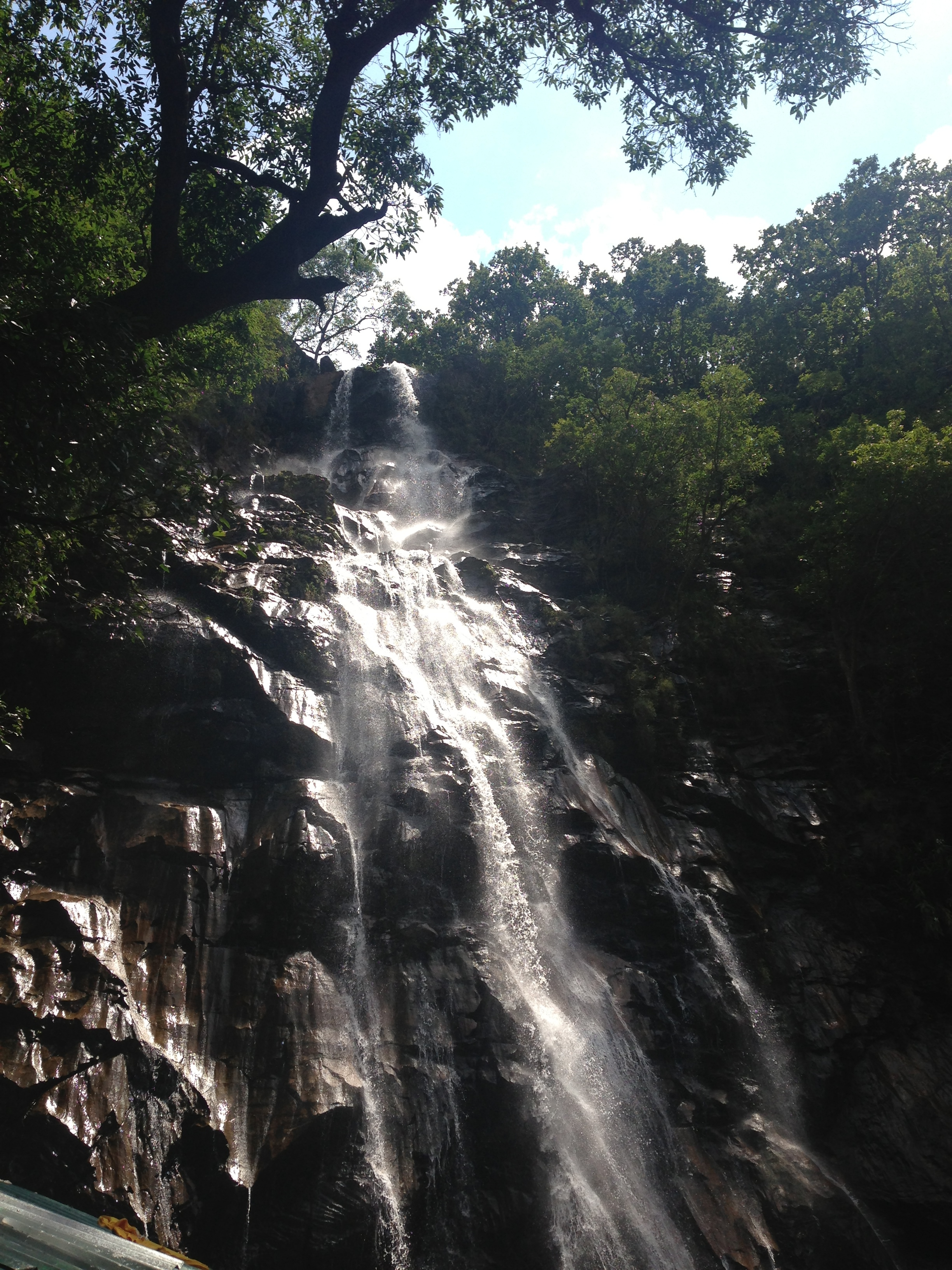
Bee Fall

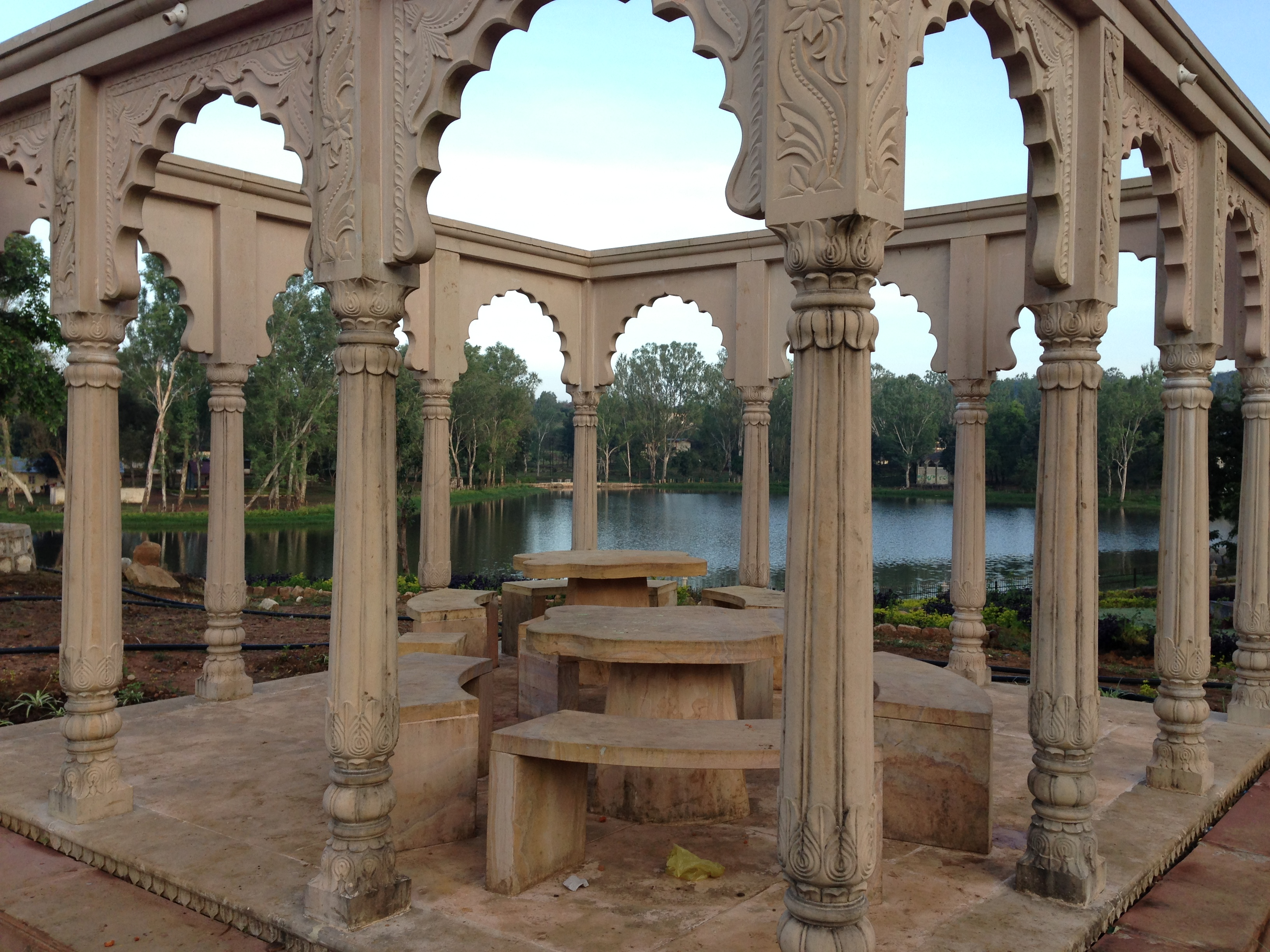
Sitting spot at Pachmarhi Lake

Pachmarhi has a significant tourist industry, and there are numerous hotels as well as a few cottages and resorts. Many tourists come to see the local cave pavements, some of which are estimated to be 10,000 years old. Tourists also tend to visit the Pandav caves and the local wilderness, much of which is preserved due to governmental limitations on new construction. Many visitors also go paragliding and boating.

Some of the places of tourist interest there are:

- Rajat Prapat (large waterfall)
- Bee Fall
- Bada Mahadev
- Gupt Mahadev
- Chauragarh (Shiv devotees come here in huge numbers during Mahashivratri)
- Dhupgarh (the highest peak of the Satpuras and Madhya Pradesh)
- Handi Khoh (deep valley)
- Apsara Falls (fairy pool)
- Jatashankar (stalagmite-filled cave in a deep ravine)
- Dutchess Fall
- Pachmarhi Hill (whole view of Pachmarhi City)
- Pansy Pool
- Waters Meet
- Picadilly Circus
- Patharchatta
- Crumps Crag
- Lady Robertson's View
- Colletin Crag
- Mount Rosa
- Reechgarh
- Rajendra Giri (gardens with natural scenery)
- Bansri Vihar
- Little Fall
- Naagdwari
- Draupadi Kund
- Twynham Pool
- Chhota Mahadev
- Nandigad

Many visitors also come to visit the National Adventure Institute, which hosts a variety of adventure training camps.

=== Wildlife ===
The Satpura Tiger Reserve contains several large mammal species, including the tiger, leopard, wild boar, gaur (Bos gaurus), chital deer (Axis axis), muntjac deer, sambar deer (Cervus unicolor), and rhesus macaques.

The endemic fauna also includes chinkara, nilgai, wild dogs, the Indian wolf, bison, Indian giant squirrels, and flying squirrels.

=== Biosphere ===
The forests of Pachmarhi have many fruit trees such as mangoes, jamun, custard fruit, and lesser-known local fruits such as khatua, tendu, chunna, khinni, and chaar. Oak and blue pine are also abundant, and additionally, the forest is also known for having many medicinal plants and herbs.

=== Dhupgarh ===
The Satpura Range's highest point is 1,352 m. It's well-known for its sunrise and sunset views. At night, one can see the lights of neighbouring towns such as Itarsi. The summit can be reached by road or by foot.

=== Chauragarh ===
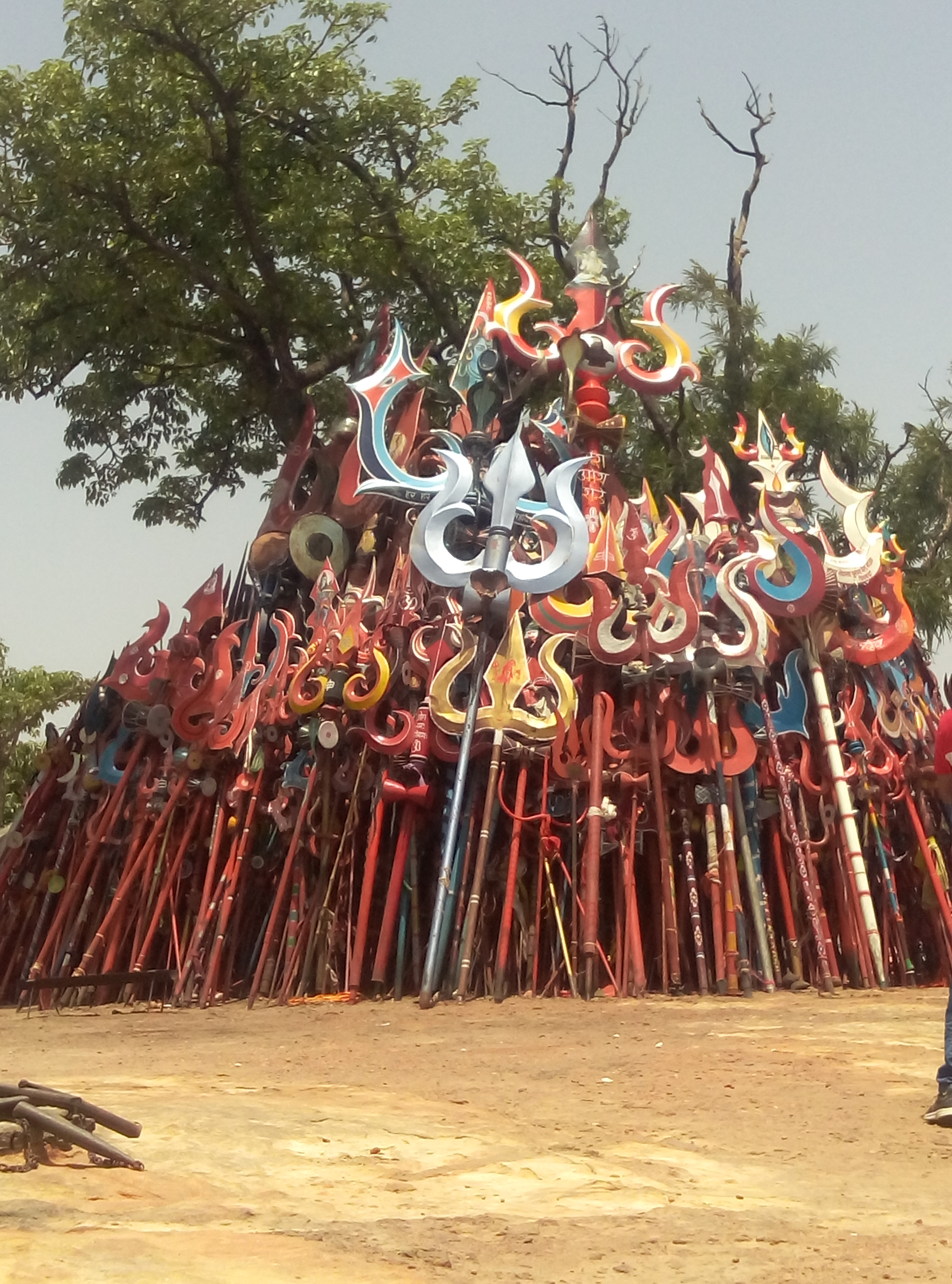
Trishuls at Chauragarh

This is the third highest peak in the Satpura ranges. It is a pilgrimage site with Lord Siva's temple at the top. The Chauragarh fort there was built by king Sangram Shah of the Gond dynasty. It was developed by SenaSahebSubha Janoji Maharaj of Nagpur। from the Maratha Era the Pilgrimage from Nagpur Start।. It is also a widely known spot for sunrise viewing. During the festivities of Nagpanchami and Mahashivratri, devotees flock to Chauragarh temple in large numbers, leaving about 2 lakh trishuls as offerings which are kept in front of the temple and also in the way of the temple.

=== Bee Hill and Bee Falls ===
This is a waterfall in Pachmarhi. It is so named because from a distance the waterfall sounds like a bee. Bee Falls takes its name from bees since this place is famous for honeybees.

=== Dutchess Fall ===
This waterfall is the most remote. There are Doctor Fish in the pool made by the waterfall. The road to this waterfall is extreme, with very steep inclinations. There is straight downward trekking of 1 km.

=== PanarPani ===
Panarpani has a natural freshwater lake with forest around it.

=== Sangam ===
This is a conflux of mountain streams behind Dhupgarh. The water in these streams is crystal clear in all seasons except of course autumn.

=== Jatashankar and Mahadev caves ===
These are mountain caves with fresh water dripping from them. Mountains feed the streams with fresh water, that they soak in during autumn. As the name suggests, these caves and many others are the abode of lord Siva.

=== Silver Falls ===
Also called Rajat Prapat/Big Fall. The falls drop over 2800 feet through the gorge, leaving a silver streak behind that gives its name.

=== Apsara Vihar ===
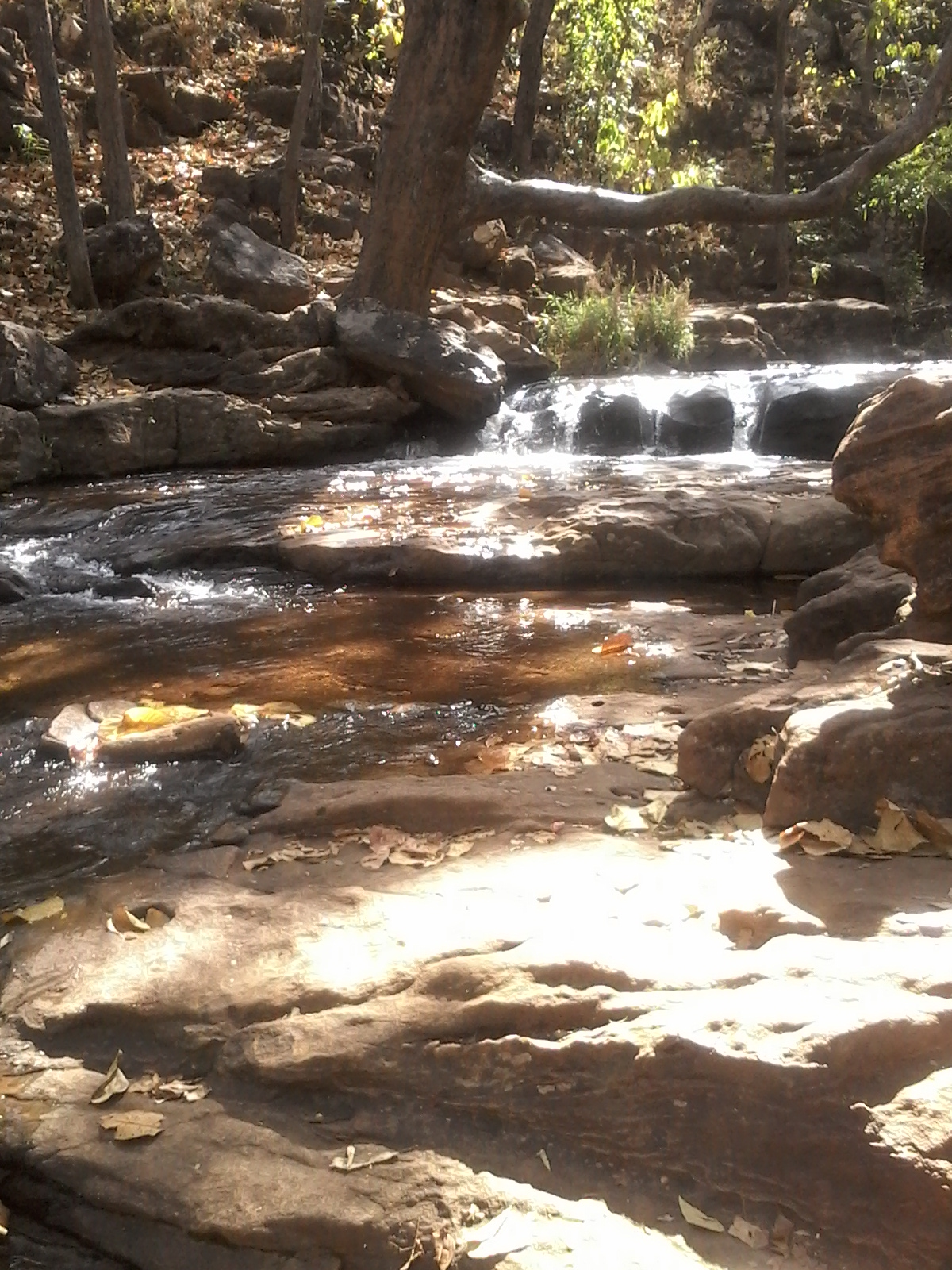
Water fall Apsara Vihar (Fairy Pool)

This is a mountain stream that creates a natural water pool, cascades and waterfall in its course.

=== Other waterfalls ===
Pachmarhi's ecosystem includes other waterfalls such as Little Fall.

New year event in Pachmarhi utsav

Every year from 25 to 31 December, Pachmarhi utsav is organised by govt. Of Mp. In which various celebrities have been called to perform stage shows at utsav ground and various places. At the end of 31 an event is organised by local association Pachmarhi Partyan Mitra and MARRS

== Film location ==
- Massey Sahib (film 1985), featuring Raghuvir Yadav, Barry John, Arundhati Roy
- Thodasa Roomani Ho Jaayen (film 1990), featuring Nana Patekar, Anita Kanwar
- Tarkieb (film 2000), featuring Nana Patekar, Tabbu, Raghuveer Yadav, Shilpa Shetty, Milind Soman
- Aśoka (film 2001), featuring Shah Rukh Khan, Kareena Kapoor Khan
- Chakravyuh(film 2012), featuring Arjun Rampal, Abhay Deol, Manoj Bajpai, Om Puri, Esha Gupta
- Trinetra (1991 film), featuring Mithun Chakraborty , Amrish Puri

== Access ==
Pachmarhi is connected from Hoshangabad, Bhopal, Itarsi, Chhindwara, Gadarwara, Narsinghpur, Indore, . Buses start from Rani Kamalapati ISBT of Bhopal and generally take close to 5–6 hours. From Indore it takes 10–11 hours via Bhopal to reach Pachmarhi. The buses move through different towns like Hoshangabad, Chhindwara, Makhan Nagar, Sohagpur and Pipariya. The road's name is State Highway 19, and its name changes to State Highway 19A from the village of Matkuli to Pachmarhi. Matkuli is trijunction of Pipariya-Chhindwara-Pachmarhi way, and Pachmarhi is nearest from here, about 28 km. Pipariya is the nearest railhead, many trains on Mumbai-Kolkata route stop at Pipariya.. Itarsi Junction is also a major railhead near Pachmari. Madhya Pradesh Tourism Development Corporation buses are available for Pachmarhi from Indore, Bhopal.

== Transport ==
The nearest airport is Bhopal and Jabalpur. The nearest railway station is Pipariya railway station.
