= Tawa River =

Coordinates: 22°48′N 77°48′E

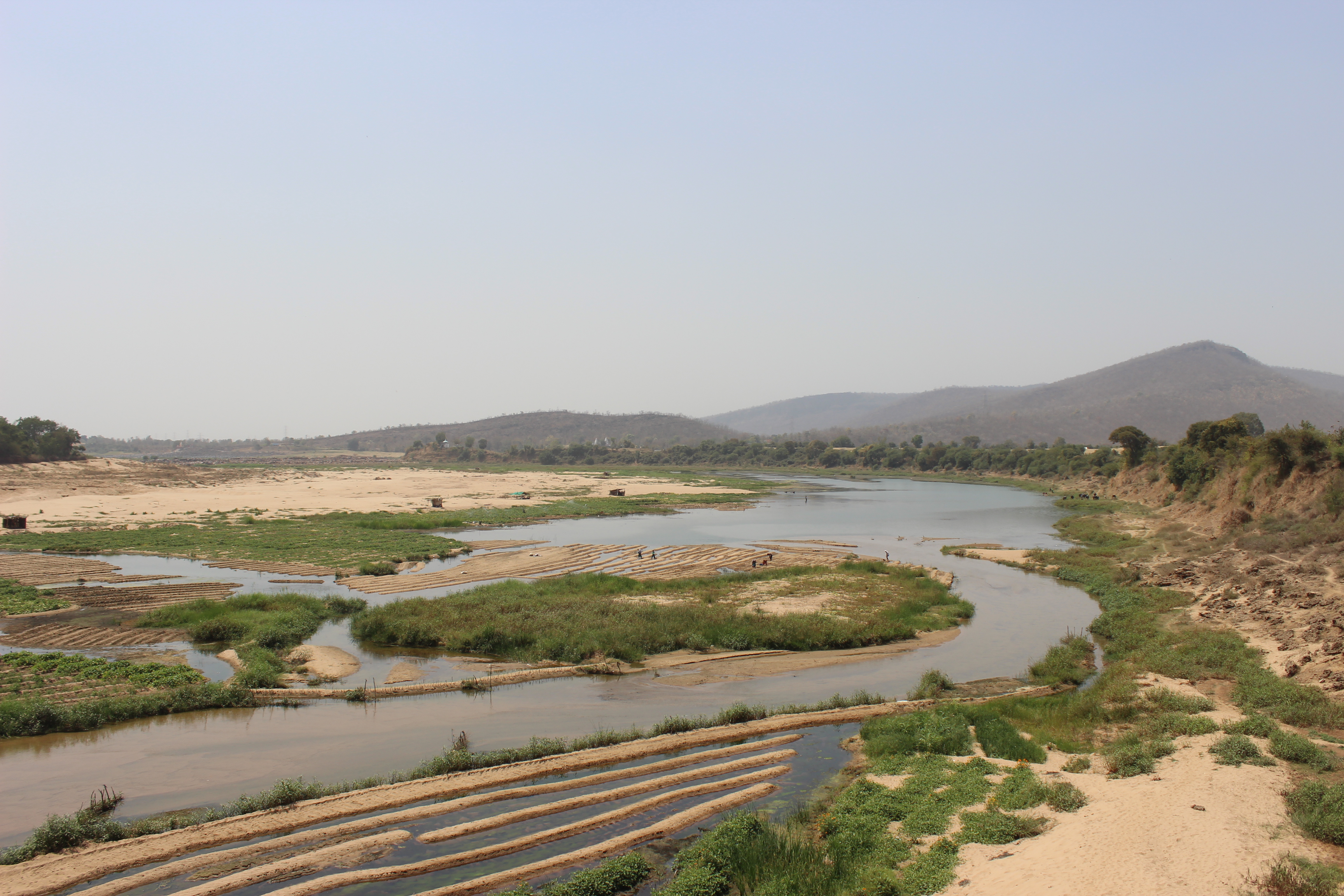
- Tawa River

Location
- Country: India, india
- State: Madhya Pradesh

Physical characteristics
- Source: Satpura Range
  - location: Junnardeo, Madhya Pradesh
- Mouth: Narmada River
  - location: Bandra Bhan, Hoshangabad district
- Length: 172 km (107 mi)

Basin features
- Tributaries
  - right: Denwa and Maachana

The Tawa River is a tributary of the Narmada River of Central India.

== Course ==
The Tawa is the Narmada's largest tributary, at 172 km (107 mi). It rises in the Satpura Range of Chhindwara district and village Hirdagarh origin point of this river. From his origin it's flowing north and west and joins the Narmada river at the village of Bandra Bhan in Narmadapuram District. Machna River and Denwa River is major Tributary of Tawa River.

== Dam ==
In 1958, construction began on Tawa Dam, which was completed in 1978 in Tawa Nagar to create Tawa Reservoir in southern Hoshangabad District. Forty-four villages were submerged by the reservoir and Satpura Dam near Sarni town also one of the important dam on this river.

== Surroundings ==
India's oldest forest preserve, the Bori Reserve Forest, was established in 1865 along the Tawa. The Bori Reserve Forest is part of the Bori Sanctuary, which is part of the Pachmarhi Biosphere Reserve, established in 1999, which covers much of the upper watershed of the Tawa.
