= Bori Wildlife Sanctuary =

Wildlife sanctuary in central India

- IUCN category IV (habitat/species management area)
- Location within Madhya Pradesh
- Interactive map of Bori Wildlife Sanctuary
- Location: Hoshangabad District, Madhya Pradesh, India
- Coordinates: 22.403°N 78.08°E
- Area: 646 km^{2} (249 mi^{2})
- Established: 1977

The Bori Wildlife Sanctuary is a wildlife sanctuary in the Hoshangabad District of Madhya Pradesh state in central India. The sanctuary covers an area of 646 km^{2} (249 mi^{2}).

It is located in the northern foothills of the Satpura Range. It is bounded by the Satpura National Park to the north and east, and by the Tawa River to the west. The sanctuary, together with Satpura National Park and the Pachmarhi Sanctuary, forms the Pachmarhi Biosphere Reserve.

== History ==
Bori Wildlife Sanctuary includes India's oldest forest preserve, the Bori Reserve Forest, established in 1865 along the Tawa River.

== Flora and fauna ==
=== Flora ===
The sanctuary is mostly covered in mixed deciduous and bamboo forests, part of the Eastern Highlands moist deciduous forests ecoregion. It is an important transition zone between the forests of western and eastern India. Dominant trees include teak (Tectona grandis), dhaora (Anogeissus latifolia), and tendu (Diospyros melanoxylon), among others.

=== Fauna ===
Large mammal species include tiger, leopard, wild boar, muntjac deer, gaur (Bos gaurus), chital deer (Axis axis), sambar (Cervus unicolor), and rhesus macaques. Small mammals include the flying squirrel, treeshrew, common mongoose, small Indian civet and Indian porcupine.
