= Dhupgarh =

Mountain in Madhya Pradesh, India

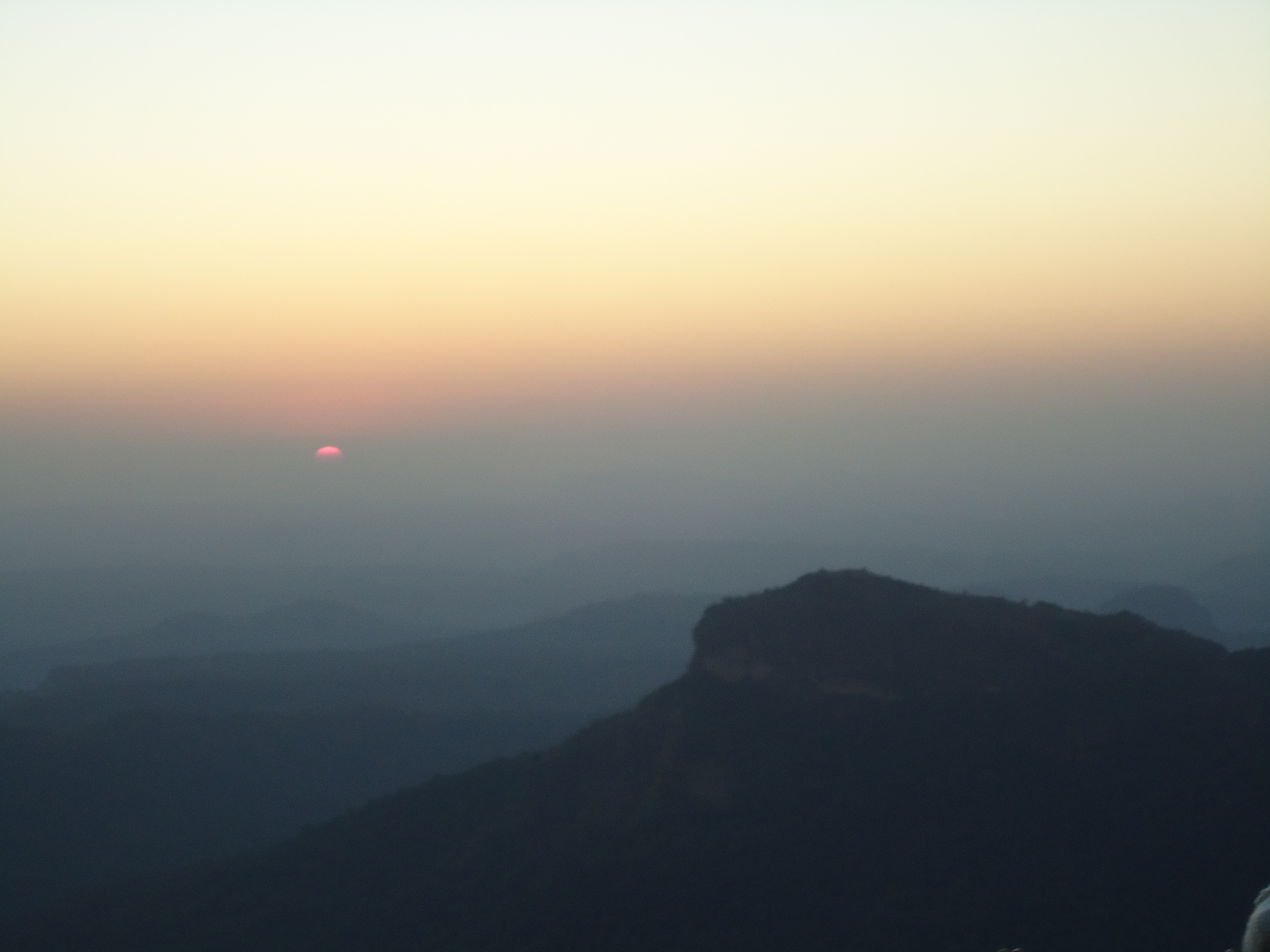
- View from Dhupgarh

Highest point
- Elevation: 1,352 m (4,436 ft)
- Listing: List of Indian states and territories by highest point
- Coordinates: 22°26′58″N 78°22′23″E

Geography
- Location within Madhya Pradesh Location within India
- Location: Pachmarhi, Pipariya tehsil, Hoshangabad district, Madhya Pradesh, India
- Parent range: Satpura

Dhupgarh or Dhoopgarh is the highest peak of the Satpura Range in Madhya Pradesh, India. It is also the highest peak of Madhya Pradesh. Located in the Pachmarhi hill station in Hoshangabad district, it has an elevation of 1,352 metres (4,436 ft). The top of the hill is a popular area to watch sunsets.

== See also ==
- Geography of Madhya Pradesh
- List of mountains in India
- List of mountains by elevation
