= Itarsi =

- City
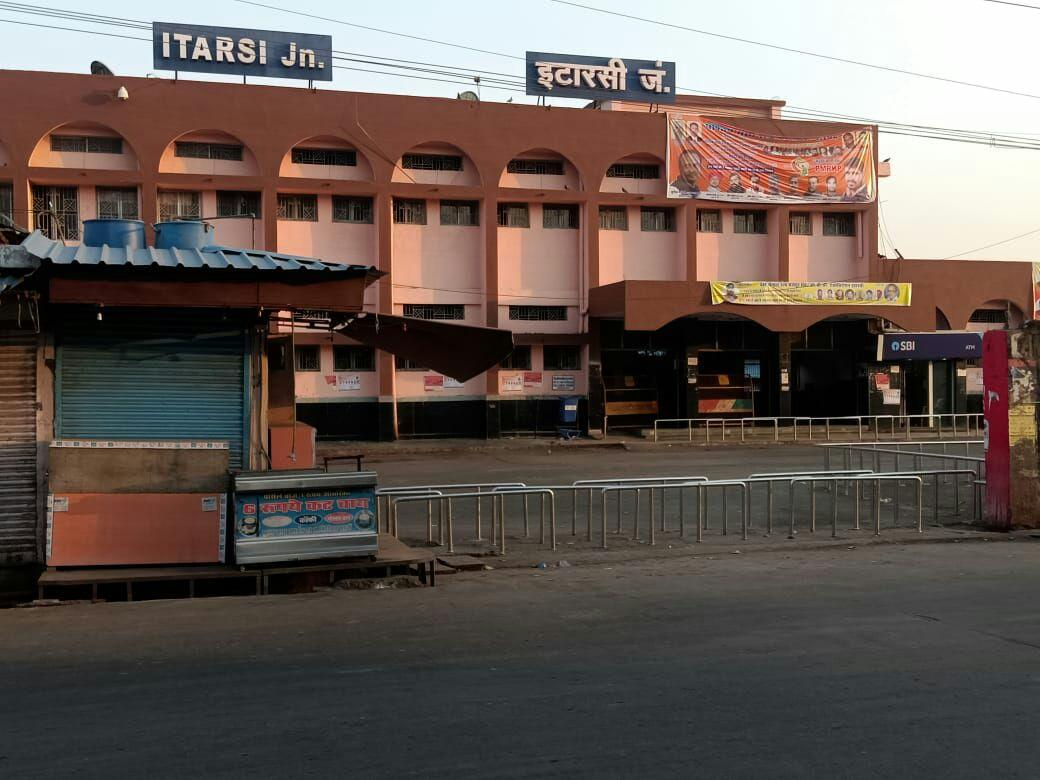
- Itarsi Junction railway station

- Itarsi (Madhya Pradesh) Itarsi (India)
- Coordinates: 22°36′41.4″N 77°45′44.3″E
- Country: India
- State: Madhya Pradesh
- District: Narmadapuram

Government
  - MLA: Dr. Sita Sharan Sharma
- Elevation: 345.86 m (1,134.7 ft)

Population (2011)
  - Total: 114,495

Languages
  - Official: Hindi
- Time zone: UTC+5:30 (IST)
- PIN: 461111
- Telephone code: +917572xxxxxx
- ISO 3166 code: IN-MP
- Vehicle registration: MP-05
- Sex ratio: 1.08:1 ♂/♀

Itarsi is a city and municipality in Narmadapuram in Madhya Pradesh, India. Itarsi is a key hub for agricultural goods and Itarsi Junction railway station is the biggest railway junction in Madhya Pradesh. Rail services from all 4 major metropolitan cities of India namely Mumbai to Kolkata and Delhi to Chennai pass through Itarsi. Itarsi has large number of agro-based industries and warehouses . Itarsi got its name by "eeta(eent)", (literally means brick in Hindi) and "rassi", (literally means rope in Hindi). Bricks and ropes had been made earlier in Itarsi. It has an Ordnance Factory. The Bori Wildlife Sanctuary and Tawa Dam are nearby.

== Geography and climate ==
Itarsi is located at 22.62°N 77.75°E. It has an average elevation of 304 metres (997 feet). Itarsi has high temperatures in summers with temperatures reaching up-to 41°C in May/June. Monsoon begins from the month of July and lasts up-to September with maximum rainfall of the District being 326.4 mm. In winters the temperatures range from 11°C to 19°C. The coldest months being December and January.

== History ==
In the British Colonial Era, Itarsi gained prominence as a strategic railway junction connecting major cities in Central India. Established by the British, the railway station played a crucial role in facilitating nationwide railway transportation. Evolving into a significant transportation hub, Itarsi became a key center for the movement of goods and passengers, contributing to its economic growth. With strategic transportation links, the city witnessed industrial development, particularly in transportation and logistics. Its diverse cultural and demographic mix reflects Itarsi's status as a vibrant urban center.

== Itarsi Tehsil population statistics ==
Itarsi is a sub district in the Narmadapuram district, in the state of Madhya Pradesh. The total population in Itarsi sub district is 240,719 as per the survey of census during 2011 by Indian Government. Of this about 123,325 people are living in the urban (towns and cities) area and about 117,394 are living in villages (rural areas)

There are 49,297 households in this sub district.

There are 124,898 males (52%) and 115,821 females (48%).

== Demographics ==
As of the 2011 Census of India, Itarsi had a population of 114,495. Males constitute 52% of the population and females 48%. Itarsi has an average literacy rate of 75%, higher than the national average of 59.5%: male literacy is 81% and female literacy is 69%. In Itarsi, 13% of the population is under 6 years of age. Itarsi comes under "Constituents of Urban Agglomerations of Madhya Pradesh" includes Itarsi (M), Pathrauta (part) (OG), Bhilakhedi (CT) and Meharagaon (CT).

== Administration ==
The city is a Tehsil under Narmadapuram District. It is a part of Narmadapuram Vidhan Sabha (legislative assembly) and comes under Narmadapuram - Narsinghpur Lok Sabha (Parliament) constituency. It has a municipality with 34 wards and is headed by a municipality chairperson.

== Transport ==
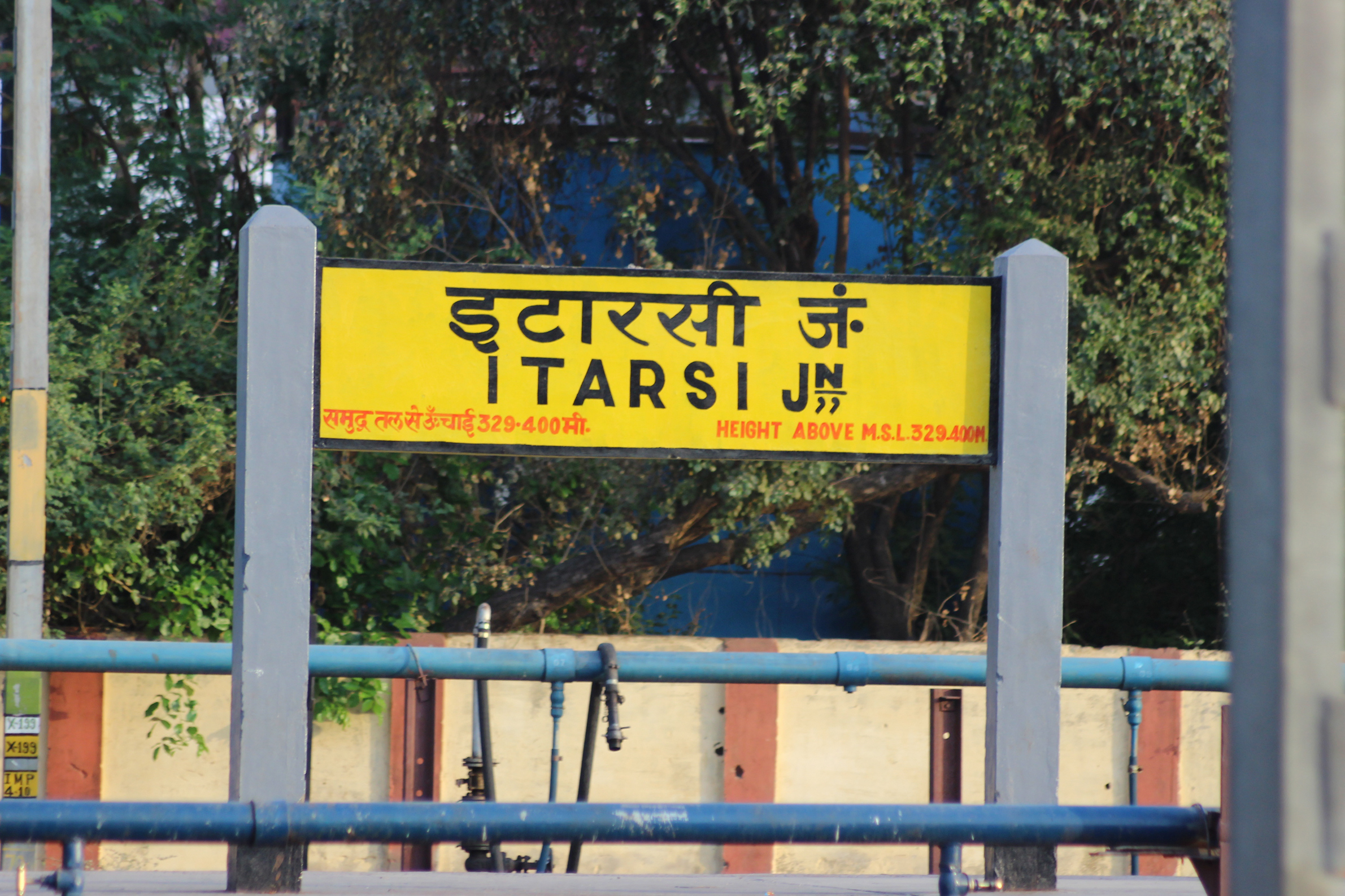
Itarsi Junction railway station

Itarsi Junction railway station is one of the biggest railway junctions in Madhya Pradesh, at the crossing of important east–west and north–south routes. Itarsi comes under West Central Railway zone whose headquarters is in Jabalpur. Itarsi is connected via broad gauge lines to Bhopal and Delhi to the north, Bhusawal and Mumbai to the west, the railway junctions of Nagpur to the south and Jabalpur to the east. Rail services from Mumbai to Guwahati and Delhi to Chennai pass through Itarsi. 350 trains are daily passing through. Itarsi runs one express train — Vindhyachal express — and it runs three passenger trains in Jabalpur route daily. Itarsi is the busiest railway station in Bhopal division. The new platforms 6 and 7 opened for Jabalpur, Nagpur and Bhusawal routes.

National Highway (NH-69) connects Itarsi to major cities Bhopal and Nagpur. New four lane roads are under the making in to be functional under 5 years. Four Duronto Express trains have technical halts at Itarsi.

The nearest airport is in Bhopal.

Under construction project - * Itarsi-Bhusawal 3rd line. * Itarsi-nagpur 3rd line (Central Railway pushes Rs 140cr third line project in ghat section). * Itarsi-bhopal 3rd line. *

== Diesel Loco Shed ==
Itarsi Diesel Loco Shed is an engine shed located in Itarsi. It comes under the Jabalpur railway division of the West Central Railway zone.

=== History ===
As one of the oldest Diesel Loco Sheds, it was opened in the year 1964 with a total number of 40 locomotives.

=== Operations ===
After the electrification of Itarsi-Allahabad section at a cost of Rs 350 cr and Itarsi-Jabalpur at a cost of Rs 134 cr, the shed now services both diesel and electric locomotives. Two effluent treatment plants and Incinerators are also available. It also has canteen facility for the staff members. In 2020, it employed around 750 people.

In 2014, amidst reports of contact dermatitis caused by diesel handling in other Indian Railway sheds, around 100 mechanics from Itarsi shed also reported persistent skin afflictions.

In 2021, 23 diesel locomotives were scrapped in the shed earning 13.86 crores. The shed consumed 875 MWh electricity in 2019-20 and 563 MWh in 2020–21.

=== Locomotives ===
SN	Locomotive	HP	Quantity
1.	WDM-3A	3100	11
2.	WDM-3D	3300	34
3.	WDG-4/4D	4500	53
4.	WDS-6	1400	1
5.	WAG-5	4360	71
Total Locomotives Active as of May 2024			170
