= Satpura Range =

Hill range in central India

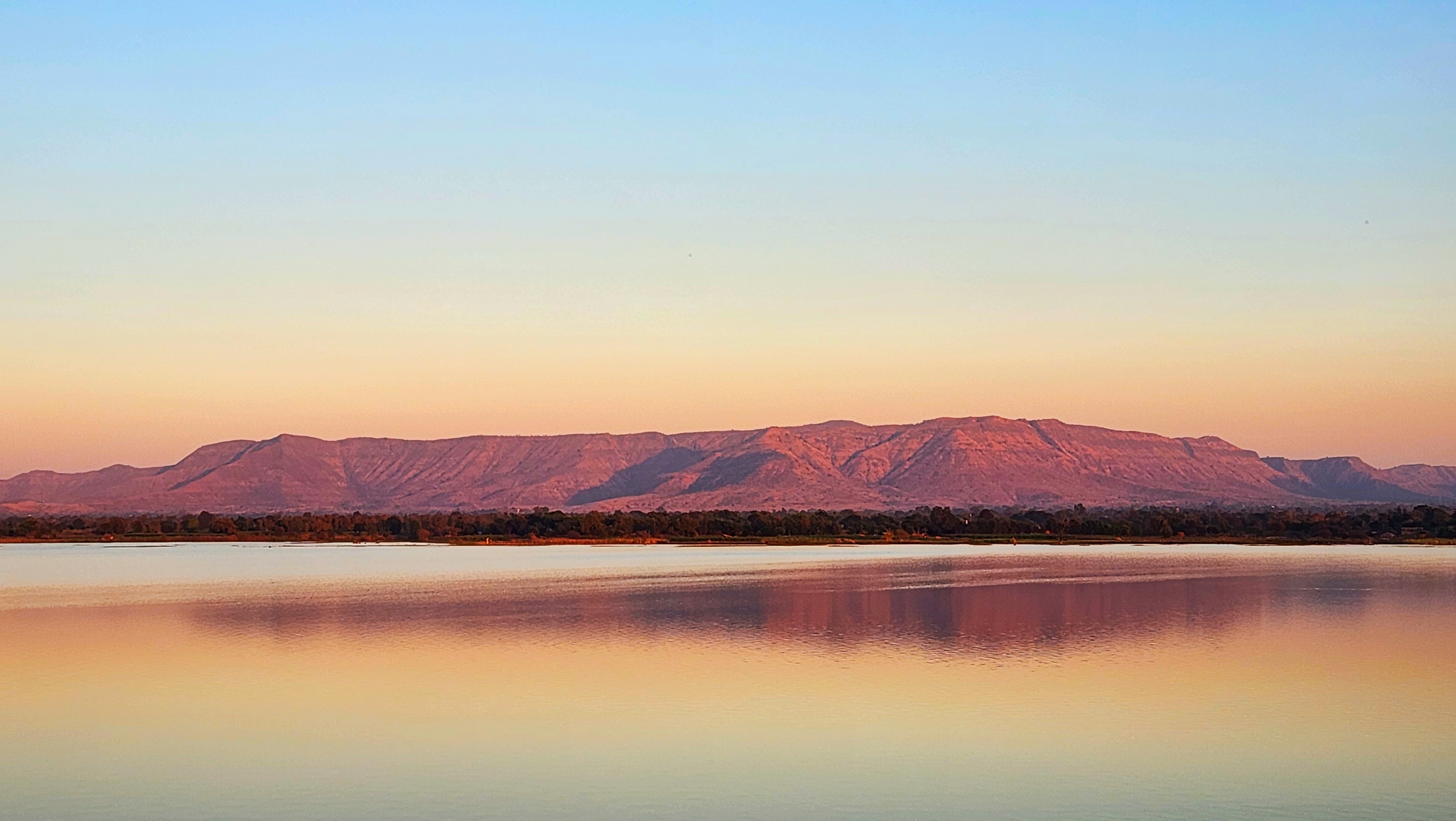
- The Satpura Range near Nandurbar, Maharashtra

Highest point
- Peak: Dhupgarh
- Elevation: 1,350 m (4,430 ft)
- Coordinates: 22°27′2″N 78°22′14″E

Geography
- Country: India
- States: Madhya Pradesh; Maharashtra; Chhattisgarh; Gujarat
- Rivers: Narmada; Mahanadi; Tapti
- Range coordinates: 21°59′N 74°52′E

Geology
- Orogeny: a study

The Satpura Range (IPA: [sət̪pʊɽaː]), formerly also known as the Seeonee Hills, is a range of hills in central India. The range rises in eastern Gujarat running east through the border of Maharashtra and Madhya Pradesh and ends in Chhattisgarh. The range parallels the Vindhya Range to the north, and these two east–west ranges divide the Indian subcontinent into the Indo-Gangetic Plain of northern India and the Deccan Plateau of the south. The Narmada River originates from the north-eastern end of Satpura in Amarkantak, and runs in the depression between the Satpura and Vindhya ranges, draining the northern slope of the Satpura range, running west towards the Arabian Sea. The Tapti River originates in the eastern-central part of Satpura, crossing the range in the center and running west at the range's southern slopes before meeting the Arabian Sea at Surat, draining the central and southern slopes of the range. Multai, the place of Tapti river origin is located about 465 kilometer far, south-westerly to Amarkantak, separated across by the hill range. The Godavari River and its tributaries drain the Deccan Plateau, which lies south of the range, and the Mahanadi River drains the easternmost portion of the range. The Godavari and Mahanadi rivers flow into the Bay of Bengal. At its eastern end, the Satpura Range meets the hills of the Chotanagpur Plateau. The Satpura Range is a horst mountain and is flanked by Narmada Graben in the north and the much smaller but parallel Tapi Graben in the south.

== Geography ==
The eastern portion of the range receives more rainfall than the western portion, and the eastern range, together with the Eastern Ghats, constitute the eastern highlands moist deciduous forests ecoregion. The seasonally dry western portion of the range, together with the Narmada valley and the western Vindhya Range, are within the Narmada valley dry deciduous forests ecoregion.

This mountain range serves as a natural border between Maharashtra and Madhya Pradesh states.

The Narmada and the Tapti are major rivers that drain into the Arabian Sea. The Narmada originates in eastern Madhya Pradesh ( India) and flows west across the state, through a narrow valley between the Vindhya Range and spurs of the Satpura Range. It flows into the Gulf of Khambhat. The Tapi (also known as Tapti) follows a shorter, parallel course, between 80 and 160 kilometres (50 and 100 miles) south of the Narmada, flowing through the states of Maharashtra and Gujarat to drain into the Gulf of Khambhat.

== Ecology ==
Most of the Satpura Range was heavily forested; but the area has been subject to gradual deforestation in recent decades, although significant stands of forests remain. These forest enclaves provide habitat to several at risk and endangered species, including the Bengal tiger (Panthera tigris tigris), Barasingha, gaur (Bos gaurus), dhole (Cuon alpinus), sloth bear (Melursus ursinus), chousingha (Tetracerus quadricornis), and blackbuck (Antilope cervicapra).

However, Satpura is now famous for numerous tiger reserves. Once upon a time, it was ruled by wild Indian elephants and lion and Asiatic cheetahs.

Several protected areas have been earmarked in the area, including the Kanha, Pench, Gugamal and Satpura National Parks, Pachmarhi Biosphere Reserve, Melghat Tiger Reserve and the Bori Reserve Forest.

The Satpura Foundation is a grass-roots organization that coordinates conservation efforts in the area, which continue to face challenges from development and infrastructure projects, logging and poaching.

== Tourism ==
The national parks, hill stations, reserves and towns in the Satpura Range attract hundreds of thousands of visitors each year. Places listed here are from East to west

- Amarkantak (NLK Amarakaṇṭaka), also called "Teerthraj" (the king of pilgrimages) is a pilgrim town and a Nagar Panchayat in Anuppur, Madhya Pradesh, India. The Amarkantak region is a unique natural heritage area and is the meeting point of the Vindhya and the Satpura Ranges, with the Maikal Hills being the fulcrum. This is where the Narmada River, the Son River and Johila River emerge. Popular 15th-century Indian mystic and poet Kabir is said to have meditated on Kabir Chabutra, also called the platform of Kabir situated in the town of Amarkantak.
- Bandhavgarh National Park, is one of the popular national parks in Madhya Pradesh located near satpura range in the Umaria district of Madhya Pradesh, located north of Amarkantak. Bandhavgarh was declared a national park in 1968, with an area of 105 km^{2}. The buffer is spread over the forest divisions of Umaria and Katni and totals 437 km^{2}. The park derives its name from the most prominent hillock of the area, which is said to be given by Hindu Lord Rama to his brother Lakshmana to keep a watch on Lanka (Ceylon). Hence the name Bandhavgarh (Sanskrit: Brother's Fort). This park has a large biodiversity. The density of the tiger population at Bandhavgarh is one of the highest known in India. The park has a large breeding population of leopards, and various species of deer. Maharaja Martand Singh of Rewa captured the first white tiger in this region in 1951. This white tiger, Mohan, is now stuffed and on display in the palace of the Maharajas of Rewa.
- Kanha National Park is a national park and a tiger reserve near the range in Mandla and Balaghat districts of Madhya Pradesh, India. In the 1930s, Kanha area was divided into two sanctuaries, Hallon and Banjar, of 250 and 300 km^{2}. Kanha National Park was created on 1 June 1955. Today it stretches over an area of 940 km^{2} in the two districts Mandla and Balaghat. Together with a surrounding buffer zone of 1,067 km^{2} and the neighboring 110 km^{2} Phen Sanctuary it forms the Kanha Tiger Reserve. Madhya Pradesh Forest Department. Retrieved 14 April 2010. This makes it the largest national park in Central India. The park has a significant population of royal Bengal tiger, leopards, the sloth bear, barasingha and Indian wild dog.
- Pench National Park is situated to the south of the Satpura. It is named after the name of the river Pench which flows through this area. This is the 19th project tiger reserve in India and was declared so in 1992. It has tropical moist deciduous forest. Meandering through the park from north to south. It is located on the southern boundary of Madhya Pradesh, bordering Maharashtra, in the districts of Seoni and Chhindwara. Pench National Park, comprising 758 km^{2} (293 sq mi), out of which a core area of 299 km^{2} (115 sq mi) of Indira Priyadarshini Pench National Park and the Mowgli Pench Sanctuary and remaining 464 km^{2} (179 sq mi) of the Pench national park is the buffer area. The area of the present tiger reserve has a glorious history. A description of its natural wealth and richness occurs in Ain-i-Akbari.
- Chhindwara is one of the larger towns located in the Satpura Range. It is situated on a plateau, surrounded by the lush green fields, rivers and sagwan trees. Chhindwara is surrounded by dense forest with diverse flora and fauna. Pench and Kanhan are two important rivers of Chhindwara. Chhindwara is an urban agglomeration and a municipality in Chhindwara district in the Indian state of Madhya Pradesh. It is the administrative headquarters of Chhindwara District. Chhindwara is reachable by rail or road from adjacent cities Nagpur and Jabalpur. The nearest airport is in Nagpur (130 km); however, a small airport (air-strip) is available at Chhindwara for landing charter aeroplanes/helicopters.
- Pachmarhi, a hill station in the range is located in Madhya Pradesh, has a number of attractions from its forests, animal reserve, rivers and rocky terrain. It is a tourist destination for trekking, fishing and adventure activities. It is also known as 'Queen of Satpura', and became a destination for Bollywood film shootings. The highest point of the Satpura range, Dhupgarh, is located in Pachmarhi.
- Satpura National Park is located in the district Narmadapuram of Madhya Pradesh. It gets its name from the Satpura Range. It covers an area of 524 km^{2} (202 sq mi). Satpura National Park, and along with the adjoining Bori and Panchmarhi Sanctuaries, provides 1,427 km^{2} (551 sq mi) of unique central Indian highland ecosystem. The terrain of the national park is extremely rugged and consists of sandstone peaks, narrow gorges, ravines and dense forests. Satpura National Park, being part of a unique ecosystem, is very rich in biodiversity. The animals here are the tiger, Indian leopard, sambar, chital, Bhedki, nilgai, four-horned antelope, chinkara, bison (gour), wild boar, wild dog, bear, black buck, fox, porcupine, flying squirrel, mouse deer, Indian giant squirrel, etc. There are a variety of birds. Hornbills and peafowl are common birds found here. The flora consists of mainly sal, teak, tendu, Phyllanthus emblica, mahua, bel, bamboo, and grasses and medicinal plants.
- Bori Wildlife Sanctuary, is located in Madhya Pradesh. Bori Wildlife Sanctuary includes India's oldest forest preserve, the Bori Reserve Forest, established in 1865 along the Tewa River. The sanctuary covers an area of 518 km^{2} (200 sq mi), located in the northern foothills of the Satpura Range. It is bounded by the Satpura National Park to the north and east, and by the Tawa River to the west. The sanctuary, together with Satpura National Park and the Pachmarhi Sanctuary, forms the Pachmarhi Biosphere Reserve. The sanctuary is mostly covered in mixed deciduous and bamboo forests, part of the eastern highlands moist deciduous forests ecoregion. It is an important transition zone between the forests of western and eastern India. Dominant trees include teak (Tectona grandis), dhaora (Anogeissus latifolia), tendu (Diospyros melanoxylon), among others. Large mammal species include tiger, leopard, wild boar, muntjac deer, gaur (Bos gaurus), chital deer (Axis axis), sambar (Cervus unicolor), and rhesus macaques.
- Multai is a town and a Nagar Palika in Betul district in the Indian state of Madhya Pradesh. Multai is one of the southern cities of Madhya Pradesh, occupying almost half of the Satpura plateau. Considering the small villages around, it occupies a large area in width of the Satpura Range between the valley of the Narmada on the north and the bearer plains on the south. Forests lie to the west of the city between the districts of East Nimar and Amravati. It lies on the Northern bank of the Tapti. Multai is located at 21.77°N 78.25°E. It has an average elevation of 749 metres (2457 feet). Multai is the holy place and origin for river Tapti. The daughter of Surya, the Sun God, Mata Tapti is worshiped here in two different temples Prachin Mandir and Naveen Mandir. The Multai town is decorated on Akhad Saptami Tapti Janmotsav and an annual Mela is organized on this occasion. In Multai town there are many ancient Hindu Temples, dedicated to Lord Shiva and Hanuman.
- Muktagiri is a Jain pilgrimage centre, located on border of Madhya Pradesh and Maharashtra in India. It comes under Bhainsdehi tehsil of Betul district or Baitul district in Madhya Pradesh, India. It is 14 km away from Paratwada, Dist. Amravati, Maharashtra. Muktagiri is 7 km away from Kharpi village on Paratwada - Baitul road. Muktagiri is also called as 'Mendhagiri'. There are 52 temples on the mountain, surrounding a waterfall. The waterfall is generally visible only when there is enough rainfall in the area. People can plan a trip to Muktagiri between June and September to see the waterfall. A lot of monkeys can be seen near the 10th Temple – Bhagwan Sheetalnath temple – near which the waterfall is located. The 10th Temple is an ancient temple and is inside an ancient cave. The cave is prone to stonefall (which is generally said to happen only during night). Also, lot of honeybees are at a large distance from the cave. The 1st Temple, 10th Temple, 26th Temple and 40th Temple are the main temples.
- Chikhaldara is a hill retreat in Maharashtra located in Satpura ranges in Amravati District. It has a number of rivers, waterfalls, dense forests, rocks, mountains, trekking, and cool air. It has various viewing points such as Bhimkund waterfall, Devi point waterfall, Vairat point (highest point), Gavilgarh Fort, Prospect point, Mozari point, coffee garden, Panchbol point, etc. It is the only hill station in Vidharbha region of Maharashtra. Also it is the origin point of many river such as Pili, Chandrabhaga, Shahnoor, Bichhan, Sapan, Sipna, Dolar, Bholeshwari, etc.
- Melghat Tiger Reserve is a tiger reserve located in northern part of Amravati District of Maharashtra State in India. The Tapti River and the Gawilgadh ridge of the Satpura Range form the boundaries of the reserve. In 1985 Melghat Wildlife Sanctuary was created. The Tapi River (also known as Tapti River) flows through the northern end of the Melghat Tiger Reserve, through a forest which lies within the catchment area of the river system. Many different kinds of wildlife, both flora and fauna, are found here. And there many river flowing through the reservoir such as Sipna River, Khurshi River, Dolar River, Garga River, Khapra River, etc.
- Gugamal National Park is another national park located in Maharashtra and in Satpura Range has an area of 1,673.93 km^{2} (646.31 sq mi). Built in 1974, this park is located in Chikhaldara and Dharni Tehsils of Amravati District, Maharashtra, India. It is part of Melghat Tiger Reserve. The forest in rugged and hilly area of Melghat is typical southern dry deciduous forest. This consist mainly of Tectona grandis, Ain, Tiwas, Aola, Lendia, Dhawada, Kusum are the important tree species. Bamboo is widely spread in the forests. There are some orchids and strobilanthes in the upper hills. The area is rich in medicinal plants. The area is rich in wild mammals including tiger, panther, sloth bear, wild dog, jackal, hyena, chousingha, sambar (largest deer) gaur, barking deer, ratel, flying squirrel, cheetal (a deer), nilgai, wild boar, langur, rhesus monkey, and macaque. Also found here are 25 types of fish and many varieties of butterfly. Crocodiles were re-introduced in a systematic manner in March 1990 and February 1991 in Siddu Kund in Gadga River near Dhakna and Hathikund in the Dolar river in the Gugamal National Park.
- Toranmal is a hill retreat in Maharashtra. Its Gorakhnath Temple, dedicated to Lord Shiva and visited by thousands of devotees on Mahashivratri. Pilgrims often walk barefoot for days from surrounding areas in the Nandurbar district and across Maharashtra, Madhya Pradesh and Gujarat to make the yatra to Toranmal through Shahada.
- Shoolpaneshwar Wildlife Sanctuary, covering 607.70 km^{2} (234.63 sq mi), is located in Narmada district of Gujarat. It has 575 species of flowering plants, with vast patches of bamboo and it comprises a deciduous forest with semi-evergreen trees. Many type of animals like sloth bear, leopard, rhesus macaque, chausinga, barking deer, pangolin, herpetofauna, birds including Alexandrian parakeet are found here.
- Mohgaon Haveli, in Saunsar, Pandhurna District of Madhya Pradesh is famous for its only Ardhnarishwar Shivlinga in World.
- Gotmar mela in Pandhurna District is also very famous.

== Legacy ==
Rudyard Kipling's Jungle Book was set in the "Seeonee Hills", an area of the Satpura Range now partially preserved in the Pench Tiger Reserve in Seoni District. The lush sal and bamboo forests, grassy meadows, and ravines of Kanha also featured in the novel.

== See also ==
- Ghatbori village
- INS Satpura (F48) is a Shivalik class frigate of the Indian Navy named for the range.
- Central Highlands (India)
- Tourism in Madhya Pradesh
- Tourism in Maharashtra
- Tourism in Gujarat
