= Banapura =

Banapura Seoni Malwa
- Town
- Location in Madhya Pradesh, India Banapura (India)
- Coordinates: 22°28′55″N 77°28′30″E
- Country: India
- State: Madhya Pradesh
- District: Narmadapuram District
- Talukas: Seoni Malwa

Languages
  - Official: Hindi
  - Other: Hindi, English and Bhuani
- Time zone: UTC+5:30 (IST)
- PIN: 461221
- Telephone code: +91 7570
- Vehicle registration: MP-05
- Nearest city: Narmadapuram
- Website: narmadapuram.nic.in/profile.html

Banapura is a small town in the Narmadapuram District of Madhya Pradesh, India. Banapura is a twin (or sister) city of Seoni Malwa.

Banapura has been culturally a rich part of Malwa. It mainly consists of Gound and Bheel tribes. Most part of the constituency is agriculture land. Narmada River and Tawa Reservoir fulfill almost 60–70% water requirement for agricultural purpose apart from monsoon. Banapura is known for highest production of wheat and soybean.

During British era the city was administrated by Thakur family and post independence it became a part of Central Constituency. After the establishment of Madhya Pradesh as a state, Banapura became a part of the Hoshanbabad district.

As of 2001 India census, Seoni Malwa had a population of 26,195. Males constitute 52% of the population and females 48%. Seoni Malwa has an average literacy rate of 74%, higher than the national average of 59.5%: male literacy is 81%, and female literacy is 67%. In Seoni Malwa, 13% of the population is under 6 years of age.

== Schools ==
- Kendriya Vidyalaya (Central School)
- Government Higher Secondary School
- (Government) Girls' School
- Jeeva Jyoti School
- Narmada Valley School
- SHRI GYANRATNA ACADEMY

College

- Government Kusum Mahavidyalaya

Temples

- Bheelat Dev Mandir - 4 km towards Hoshangabad
- Khedapati Mandir
- Hanuman Mandir at Dudhiyabad

Rivers

- Kandeli

Bridges

- Kandeli river bridge

Ghat or River Banks

- Babri Ghat - 22 km in north-west
- Aawali Ghat - 26 km in north

Banks

- State Bank of India
- State Bank of India (Agriculture Development Branch)
- Punjab National Bank
- Rural Development Bank

Hospitals

- Shanti Nursing Home
- Government Hospital, Seoni Malwa

Nearby

- Pachmarhi 120 km by road via Pipariya

How to Reach

By bus : Banapura and Seoni Malawa both are well connected with Bhopal, Indore, Itarsi, Hoshangabad, Pachmarhi, Harda and Khandwa via private bus services. These buses run from 5 o'clock in the morning till late at night.

- National Highway 12 is approx 60 km from Banapura and passes through Obedullaganj
- National Highway 69 is 35 km from Banapura via Hoshangabad
- National Highway 59A is 25 km from Banapura and passes through Timarni and Harda
- State Highway 15 passes through Banapura
- Distance from Bhopal to Banapura is approximately 120 km by road via Hoshangabad
- Distance from Hoshangabad to Banapura is approximately 40 km by road via Dolaria
- Distance from Itarsi to Banapura is approximately 40 km by road via Dolaria and Jamani
- Distance from Indore to Banapura is approximately 200 km by road via Harda
- Distance from Harda to Banapura is approximately 45 km by road via Timarni

Via Itarsi: Banapura is located on South-West of Itarsi. By Train There are a couple of express trains and passenger trains available for Banapura. By Bus There are direct bus services for Banapura on a regular frequency operated by local private bus agencies. By Taxi Taxi are available for hire which are run by private operators.

Banapura railway station: Banapura is well connected with Mumbai, Delhi, Bhopal and Jabalpur via broad gauge train route. Railways station is located at Banapura. This is a station to reach Seoni Malwa also.
