= Banapura railway station =

Railway station in Madhya Pradesh, India

Banapura

General information
- Location: Banapura, Narmadapuram district, Madhya Pradesh; India
- Coordinates: 22°28′14″N 77°28′54″E
- System: Indian Railways station
- Owner: Indian Railways
- Operator: West Central Railway
- Line: Jabalpur–Bhusaval section
- Platforms: 2
- Tracks: 2

Construction
- Structure type: Standard (on ground)
- Parking: Yes

Other information
- Status: Functioning
- Station code: BPF
- Zone(s): West Central Railway
- Division(s): Bhopal
Location
- Location within India Location within Madhya Pradesh

Banapura railway station is a railway station in Narmadapuram district, Madhya Pradesh. Its code is BPF. It serves Banapura town. The station consists of two platforms. It lacks many facilities including water and sanitation. Passenger and Express trains halt here.
