= Tendukheda =

Tendukheda or Tendukhera may refer to:

- Tendukheda, Damoh, Madhya Pradesh, India
- Tendukheda, Narsinghpur, Madhya Pradesh, India
  - Tendukheda Assembly constituency
