= Seoni (disambiguation) =

Seoni, formerly spelled Seeonee, is a city in the Seoni district of Madhya Pradesh, India.

Seoni may also refer to:

- Seoni district, a district in Madhya Pradesh, India
- Seoni Hills, another name for the Satpura Range in Madhya Pradesh, India
- Seoni Assembly constituency
- Seoni (Lok Sabha constituency)
- Seoni, Himachal Pradesh, a town in the Shimla district of Himachal Pradesh, India
- Seoni Malwa, a city in the Hoshangabad district of Madhya Pradesh, India
  - Seoni-Malwa Assembly constituency in Madhya Pradesh, India
