= Sohagpur railway station =

Railway station in Madhya Pradesh, India

Sohagpur

General information
- Location: Sohagpur, Narmadapuram district, Madhya Pradesh; India
- Coordinates: 22°41′38″N 78°11′41″E
- Elevation: 340 metres (1,120 ft)
- System: Indian Railways station
- Owner: Indian Railways
- Operator: West Central Railway
- Line: Jabalpur–Bhusaval section
- Platforms: 2
- Tracks: 2

Construction
- Structure type: Standard (on ground)
- Parking: Yes

Other information
- Status: Functioning
- Station code: SGP
- Zone(s): West Central Railway
- Division(s): Jabalpur
Location
- Location within India Location within Madhya Pradesh

Sohagpur railway station is a railway station in Sohagpur town of Madhya Pradesh. Its code is SGP. It serves Sohagpur town. The station consists of two platforms. Passenger, Express and Superfast trains halt here.

== Transport ==
The nearest airport is Bhopal airport about 125 km from Sohagpur.

Sohagpur railway station is connected by rail route and roadways. Many train also stops at Sohagpur Railway Station. Sohagpur railway station is about 50 km from Itarsi Junction.

To reach by bus or taxi, one needs to travel on state highway 22. Sohagpur lies at distance of 50 km from Narmadapuram and 125 km from Bhopal.
