= Bankhedi, Madhya Pradesh =

Bankhedi, Madhya Pradesh could refer to:

- Bankhedi, Narmadapuram in Narmadapuram district
- Bankhedi, Bhopal in Bhopal district
