= Vijaypal Singh (politician) =

Indian politician

Vijaypal Singh (born 1962) is an Indian politician from Madhya Pradesh. He is a four time MLA from Sohagpur Assembly constituency in Hoshangabad District. He won the 2023 Madhya Pradesh Legislative Assembly election, representing the Bharatiya Janata Party.

== Early life and education ==
Singh is from Sohagpur, Hoshangabad District, which is renamed as Narmadapuram District, Madhya Pradesh. He is the son of late Shanker Singh Rajput. He completed his B.Com in 1985 and later did M.Com. in 1988 at Dr. Hari Singh Gour University, Sagar.

== Career ==
Singh won from Sohagpur Assembly constituency in the 2023 Madhya Pradesh Legislative Assembly election representing the Bharatiya Janata Party. He polled 103,379 votes and defeated his nearest rival, Pushpraj Singh of the Indian National Congress, by a margin of 1,762 votes. He became an MLA for the first time winning the 2008 Madhya Pradesh Legislative Assembly election representing the BJP. Later, he retained the Sohagpur seat for BJP in the 2013 and 2018 Assembly elections. He won for the fourth time in the 2023 Assembly election.
