= Adamgarh Hills =

- Hills
- Location within Madhya Pradesh
- Coordinates: 22°43′48.06″N 77°43′57.42″E
- Country: India
- State: Madhya Pradesh
- District: Narmadapuram district
- Taluk: Narmadapuram

Languages
- Time zone: UTC+5:30 (IST)
- Vehicle registration: MP 05

Adamgarh Hills is located in the Narmadapuram town of the Narmadapuram district in the Indian state of Madhya Pradesh.

== Importance ==
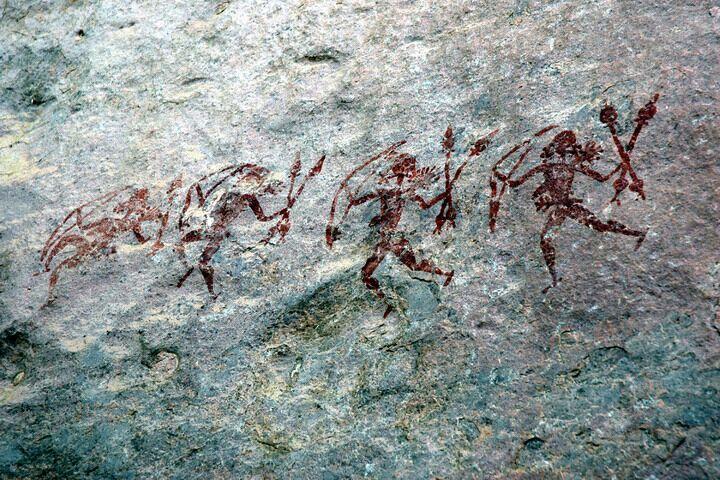
Rock paintings at Adamgarh

Adamgarh Hills is famous for the pre-historic rock shelters and rock paintings found in the hills. Stone age artefacts, lower palaeolithic and mesolithic implements have been excavated here.

Neolithic paintings were found during the research and excavation done during the 19th century. There are now 11 visible shelters out of 18 shelters found during the excavation.

== Location ==
Adamgarh Hills is located 2 km southeast to the Narmadapuram city.

== Transport ==
Narmadapuram is well connected by road and train. The nearest major railway station is in Itarsi.

== See also ==
- Itarsi
- Bhopal
- Narmadapuram
- Madhya Pradesh
