= Bhilakhedi =

- Census town
- Location in Madhya Pradesh, India Bhilakhedi (India)
- Coordinates: 22°35′52″N 77°42′7″E
- Country: India
- State: Madhya Pradesh
- District: Narmadapuram

Population (2001)
  - Total: 11,161

Languages
  - Official: Hindi
- Time zone: UTC+5:30 (IST)
- ISO 3166 code: IN-MP
- Vehicle registration: MP

Bhilakhedi is a census town in Narmadapuram district in the state of Madhya Pradesh, India.

== Demographics ==
As of 2001 India census, Bhilakhedi had a population of 11,161. Males constitute 53% of the population and females 47%. Bhilakhedi has an average literacy rate of 82%, higher than the national average of 59.5%; with male literacy of 87% and female literacy of 76%. 10% of the population is under 6 years of age.
