= Seoni-Malwa Assembly constituency =

Constituency of the Madhya Pradesh legislative assembly in India

Coordinates: 22.45°N 77.47°E

Seoni-Malwa
- Constituency No. 136 for the Madhya Pradesh Legislative Assembly

Constituency details
- Country: India
- Region: Central India
- State: Madhya Pradesh
- District: Hoshangabad
- Lok Sabha constituency: Hoshangabad
- Established: 1977
- Reservation: None

Member of Legislative Assembly
- 16th Madhya Pradesh Legislative Assembly
- Incumbent Premshankar Verma
- Party: Bharatiya Janata Party
- Elected year: 2023
- Preceded by: Sartaj Singh

Seoni-Malwa is one of the 230 Vidhan Sabha (Legislative Assembly) constituencies of Madhya Pradesh state in central India. It comprises Seoni-Malwa tehsil and parts of Hoshangabad and Itarsi tehsils, all in Hoshangabad district. As of 2023, its representative is Premshanker Kunjilal Verma of the Bharatiya Janata Party.

== Members of the Legislative Assembly ==
Election	Name	Party
1977	Hazarilal Raghuvanshi	Indian National Congress
1980	Hazarilal Raghuvanshi	Indian National Congress (Indira)
1985	Omprakash Raghubanshi	Indian National Congress
1990	Premshankar Verma	Bharatiya Janata Party
1993	Hazarilal Raghuvanshi	Indian National Congress
1998	Hazarilal Raghuvanshi	Indian National Congress
2003	Hazarilal Raghuvanshi	Indian National Congress
2008	Sartaj Singh	Bharatiya Janata Party
2013	Sartaj Singh	Bharatiya Janata Party
2018	Premshankar Verma	Bharatiya Janata Party
2023	Premshankar Verma	Bharatiya Janata Party

== Election results ==
=== 2023 ===
2023 Madhya Pradesh Legislative Assembly election: Seoni-Malwa
Party	Candidate	Votes	%	±%
BJP	Premshankar Verma	103,882	49.98	+3.4
INC	Ajay Balram Singh Patel	67,868	32.65	−7.79
Independent	Omprakash Hajarilal Raghuwanshi	18,860	9.07	
AAP	Sunil Gour	4,565	2.2	+1.27
GGP	Umed Singh Jat	3,829	1.84	−3.28
NOTA	None of the above	2,298	1.11	−0.95
Majority		36,014	17.33	+11.19
Turnout		207,866	84.76	+0.01
BJP hold		Swing		

=== 2018 ===
2018 Madhya Pradesh Legislative Assembly election: Seoni-Malwa
Party	Candidate	Votes	%	±%
BJP	Premshankar Verma	88,022	46.58	
INC	Omprakash Hazarilal Raghuwanshi	76,418	40.44	
GGP	Laxman Singh Parte	9,682	5.12	
Independent	Ram Mohan Gour (Patel)	2,091	1.11	
BSP	Meghraj Guldar Hariyale	1,796	0.95	
AAP	Rajshri D/O Shankar Singh	1,764	0.93	
NOTA	None of the above	3,897	2.06	
Majority		11,604	6.14	
Turnout		188,975	84.75	
BJP hold		Swing		
