= Brij Kishore Kuthiala =

Indian education administrator

Prof. Brij Kishore Kuthiala

Personal details
- Occupation: Professor, Vice-Chancellor
- Profession: Teaching, Administration

Prof. Brij Kishore Kuthiala is chairman of Haryana State Higher Education Council. He has also served as Vice-Chancellor, Makhanlal Chaturvedi National University of Journalism and Communication, Bhopal. He has been conferred Honorary D.Litt. by Maharshi Dayanand University. He is trained at Film & Television Institute of India, Pune and Indian Institute of Mass Communication, New Delhi. He is trustee of Bharatiya Chitra Sadhna.

== Book ==
- Makhan Lal Chaturvedi: Hindi ke Ananya Sewak.
