= Hoshangabad Lok Sabha constituency =

Lok Sabha Constituency in Madhya Pradesh

Coordinates: 22°40′N 77°30′E

Narmadapuram
- Lok Sabha constituency
- Interactive Map Outlining Hoshangabad Lok Sabha constituency

Constituency details
- Country: India
- Region: Central India
- State: Madhya Pradesh
- Assembly constituencies: Narsingpur; Tendukheda; Gadarwara; Seoni-Malwa; Narmadapuram; Sohagpur; Pipariya; Udaipura
- Established: 1952
- Total electors: 18,55,692
- Reservation: None

Member of Parliament
- 18th Lok Sabha
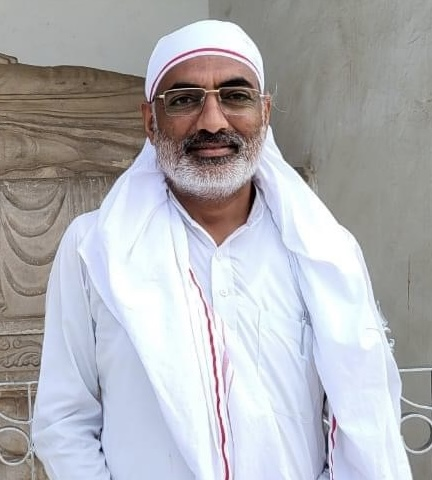
- Incumbent Darshan Singh Choudhary
- Party: Bharatiya Janata Party
- Elected year: 2024

Narmadapuram Lok Sabha constituency is one of the 29 Lok Sabha constituencies in Madhya Pradesh state in central India. This constituency presently covers the entire Narmadapuram district and parts of Narsinghpur and Raisen districts.

== Assembly segments ==
Presently, since the delimitation of the parliamentary and legislative assembly constituencies in 2008, Narmadapuram Lok Sabha constituency comprises the following eight Vidhan Sabha (Legislative Assembly) segments:

#	Name	District	Member	Party	2024 Lead
119	Narsingpur	Narsinghpur	Prahlad Singh Patel	BJP	BJP
120	Tendukheda	Narsinghpur	Vishwanath Singh Patel	BJP	BJP
121	Gadarwara	Narsinghpur	Uday Pratap Singh	BJP	BJP
136	Seoni-Malwa	Narmadapuram	Prem Shankar Verma	BJP	BJP
137	Narmadapuram	Narmadapuram	Dr.Sita Sharan Sharma	BJP	BJP
138	Sohagpur	Narmadapuram	Vijaypal Singh	BJP	BJP
139	Pipariya (SC)	Narmadapuram	Thakurdas Nagwansi	BJP	BJP
140	Udaipura	Raisen	Narendra Shivaji Patel	BJP	BJP

== Members of Parliament ==
Year	Member	Party
1952	Hari Vishnu Kamath	Praja Socialist Party
1952	Syed Ahmed	Indian National Congress
1957	Raghunath Singh Kiledar	Indian National Congress
1957	Maganlal Bagdi	Indian National Congress
1962	Hari Vishnu Kamath	Praja Socialist Party
1967	Nitiraj Singh	Indian National Congress
1971	Nitiraj Singh	Indian National Congress
1977	Hari Vishnu Kamath	Janata Party
1980	Rameshwar Neekhra	Indian National Congress (I)
1984	Rameshwar Neekhra	Indian National Congress
1989	Sartaj Singh	Bharatiya Janata Party
1991	Sartaj Singh	Bharatiya Janata Party
1996	Sartaj Singh	Bharatiya Janata Party
1998	Sartaj Singh	Bharatiya Janata Party
1999	Sundar Lal Patwa	Bharatiya Janata Party
2004	Sartaj Singh	Bharatiya Janata Party
2009	Uday Pratap Singh	Indian National Congress
2014	Uday Pratap Singh	Bharatiya Janata Party
2019	Uday Pratap Singh	Bharatiya Janata Party
2024	Darshan Singh Choudhary	Bharatiya Janata Party

== Election results ==
=== 2024 ===
2024 Indian general election: Hoshangabad
Party	Candidate	Votes	%	±%
BJP	Darshan Singh Choudhary	8,12,147	64.99	−4.36
INC	Sanjay Sharma	3,80,451	30.44	+4.83
BSP	Ragovind Baruaa	15,387	1.23	+0.02
NOTA	None of the above	14936	1.2	−0.25
Majority		431,696	34.55	−9.19
Turnout		12,47,298 (Note: does not include postal ballots)	67.21	▼7.01
BJP hold		Swing		

=== 2019 ===
2019 Indian general elections: Narmadapuram
Party	Candidate	Votes	%	±%
BJP	Uday Pratap Singh	877,927	69.35	+4.46
INC	Shailendra Diwan	3,24,245	25.61	−1.46
BSP	M. P. Choudhary	15,364	1.21	−0.16
API	Dinesh Katare	7,833	0.62	New
IND.	Madan Mohan	5,437	0.43	New
NOTA	None of the Above	18,413	1.45	−0.37
Majority		5,53,682	43.74	+5.92
Turnout		12,66,304	74.22	+8.46
BJP hold		Swing	+4.46	

=== 2014 ===
2014 Indian general elections: Narmadapuram
Party	Candidate	Votes	%	±%
BJP	Uday Pratap Singh	6,69,128	64.89	+19.86
INC	Devendra Patel (Guddu)	2,79,168	27.07	−20.66
AAP	Maya Vishwakarma	17,837	1.73	New
BSP	Pradeep Ahirwar	14,154	1.37	−0.50
IND.	Devendra Patel (Gudda)	13,412	1.30	New
NOTA	None of the Above	18,741	1.82	New
Majority		3,89,960	37.82	+35.12
Turnout		10,31,175	65.76	+10.94
BJP gain from INC		Swing	+17.16	

=== 2009 ===
2009 Indian general elections: Narmadapuram
Party	Candidate	Votes	%	±%
INC	Uday Pratap Singh	3,39,496	47.73	N/A
BJP	Rampal Singh	3,20,251	45.03	N/A
IND.	Sudama Prasad	13,325	1.87	N/A
BSP	B. M. Kaushik	13,299	1.87	N/A
IND.	Dinesh Kumar Ahirwar	6,456	0.91	N/A
Majority		19,245	2.70	N/A
Turnout		7,11,229	54.82	N/A
INC gain from BJP		Swing		

== See also ==
- Narmadapuram district
- List of constituencies of the Lok Sabha
