= Sohagpur Assembly constituency =

Constituency of the Madhya Pradesh legislative assembly in India

Coordinates: 22.70°N 78.20°E

Sohagpur
- Constituency No. 138 for the Madhya Pradesh Legislative Assembly

Constituency details
- Country: India
- Region: Central India
- State: Madhya Pradesh
- District: Hoshangabad
- Lok Sabha constituency: Hoshangabad
- Established: 1972
- Reservation: None

Member of Legislative Assembly
- 16th Madhya Pradesh Legislative Assembly
- Incumbent Vijaypal Singh
- Party: Bharatiya Janata Party
- Elected year: 2023

Sohagpur is one of the 230 Vidhan Sabha (Legislative Assembly) constituencies of Madhya Pradesh state in central India. It comprises Babai tehsil, Sohagpur tehsil and parts of Itarsi tehsil, all in Hoshangabad district. As of 2023, its representative is Vijaypal Singh of the Bharatiya Janata Party. Prior to 2008, a constituency of this name existed in Shahdol district.

== Members of the Legislative Assembly ==
Year	Member	Party
1998	Krishnapal Singh	Indian National Congress
2000 (by-election)	Shabnam Mausi	Independent politician
2003	Chhote Lal Sarawagi (Khuddi Bhaiya)	Bharatiya Janata Party
2008	Vijaypal Singh	Bharatiya Janata Party
2013	Vijaypal Singh	Bharatiya Janata Party
2018	Vijaypal Singh	Bharatiya Janata Party
2023	Vijaypal Singh	Bharatiya Janata Party

== Election results ==
=== 2023 ===
2023 Madhya Pradesh Legislative Assembly election: Sohagpur
Party	Candidate	Votes	%	±%
BJP	Vijaypal Singh	103,379	48.89	+0.8
INC	Pushpraj Singh	101,617	48.05	+6.24
NOTA	None of the above	2,362	1.12	−0.32
Majority		1,762	0.84	−5.44
Turnout		211,465	87.06	+4.46
BJP hold		Swing		

=== 2018 ===
2018 Madhya Pradesh Legislative Assembly election: Sohagpur
Party	Candidate	Votes	%	±%
BJP	Vijaypal Singh	87,488	48.09	
INC	Satpal Paliya	76,071	41.81	
GGP	Rameshwar Prasad Maurya	4,207	2.31	
Independent	Shavir Shah	2,448	1.35	
BSP	Yashwant Singh Meena	2,256	1.24	
Independent	Thakur Heera Lal	1,886	1.04	
AAP	Mukesh Kumar Tiwari	1,741	0.96	
NOTA	None of the above	2,618	1.44	
Majority		11,417	6.28	
Turnout		181,939	82.6	
BJP hold		Swing		

== See also ==
- Sohagpur
- Sohagpur (Shahdol)
