= Semri Harchand =

Coordinates: 22°41′N 78°05′E

- Town
- Semri Harchand
- Location in Madhya Pradesh, India
- Country: India
- State: Madhya Pradesh
- District: Narmadapuram
- Named for: The City Is Named Behind Late Freedom Fighter Shri Harchand Meena

Government
  - Type: Democratic
  - Body: Gram Panchayat

Area
  - Total: 9.4935 km^{2} (3.6655 sq mi)

Population (2011 Census)
  - Total: 9,557
  - Density: 1,007/km^{2} (2,607/sq mi)

Languages
  - Official: Hindi
- Time zone: UTC+5:30 (IST)
- PIN: 461668
- Telephone code: 07575
- Vehicle registration: MP 05

Semri Harchand is a town located on SH 22 between Narmadapuram and Pipariya. This is the nearest city from madhai wildlife sanctuary which is world famous. The picnic point "Siddh baba " or "Siddh maharaj" is very popular between devotees of lord Shiva.Its Pincode is 461668. It comes in Narmadapuram district in the Indian state of Madhya Pradesh.
