= Kham Kheda =

- village
- Location within Madhya Pradesh Location within India
- Coordinates: 22.9784695°N 77.2692503°E
- Country: India
- State: Madhya Pradesh
- District: Bhopal
- Tehsil: Huzur
- Elevation: 487 m (1,598 ft)

Population (2011)
  - Total: 1,652
- Time zone: UTC+5:30 (IST)
- ISO 3166 code: MP-IN
- 2011 census code: 482386

Kham kheda is a village located in the Hoshangabad district (now Narmadapuram district) of Madhya Pradesh, India. It is a small agrarian settlement situated in the southern part of the district and forms part of the Narmada Valley region. The village is primarily known for its rural landscape, agricultural practices, and proximity to nearby towns.

== Geography ==
Khamkheda lies within the central Indian plains and is influenced by the Narmada River basin. The region experiences a tropical climate with hot summers, a monsoon season between June and September, and mild winters. The surrounding land consists mostly of fertile black soil suitable for farming.

== Demographics ==
The population of Khamkheda consists mainly of farming families belonging to various local communities. Hindi is the predominant language spoken in the village, along with regional dialects of Madhya Pradesh. The settlement pattern is typical of rural central India, with households organized around agricultural fields.

== Economy ==
Agriculture is the primary economic activity in Khamkheda. Farmers cultivate crops such as wheat, soybeans, maize, and pulses, depending on seasonal rainfall. Animal husbandry, including cattle and goat rearing, contributes to additional income for residents. Small local shops serve basic commercial needs.

== Transport ==
Khamkheda is connected to nearby villages and towns through rural roads. The nearest major town providing access to markets, healthcare, and administrative services is Hoshangabad (Narmadapuram). Public transport is limited, with residents primarily relying on private vehicles, shared auto-rickshaws, and buses operating on regional routes.

== Culture ==
The village observes local festivals typical to the region, including Diwali, Holi, and various harvest celebrations. Traditional folk practices, local fairs, and community gatherings form an integral part of the village's cultural identity.

== See also ==
- Hoshangabad district
- Villages in Madhya Pradesh
- Narmada Valley

== Demographics ==
According to the 2011 census of India, Kham Kheda has 376 households. The effective literacy rate (i.e. the literacy rate of population excluding children aged 6 and below) is 69.84%.

Demographics (2011 Census)
	Total	Male	Female
Population	1652	862	790
Children aged below 6 years	256	135	121
Scheduled caste	536	273	263
Scheduled tribe	60	33	27
Literates	975	582	393
Workers (all)	890	495	395
Main workers (total)	817	464	353
Main workers: Cultivators	403	235	168
Main workers: Agricultural labourers	336	174	162
Main workers: Household industry workers	9	5	4
Main workers: Other	69	50	19
Marginal workers (total)	73	31	42
Marginal workers: Cultivators	29	15	14
Marginal workers: Agricultural labourers	35	11	24
Marginal workers: Household industry workers	1	1	0
Marginal workers: Others	8	4	4
Non-workers	762	367	395
