= Rameshwar Neekhra =

Indian politician

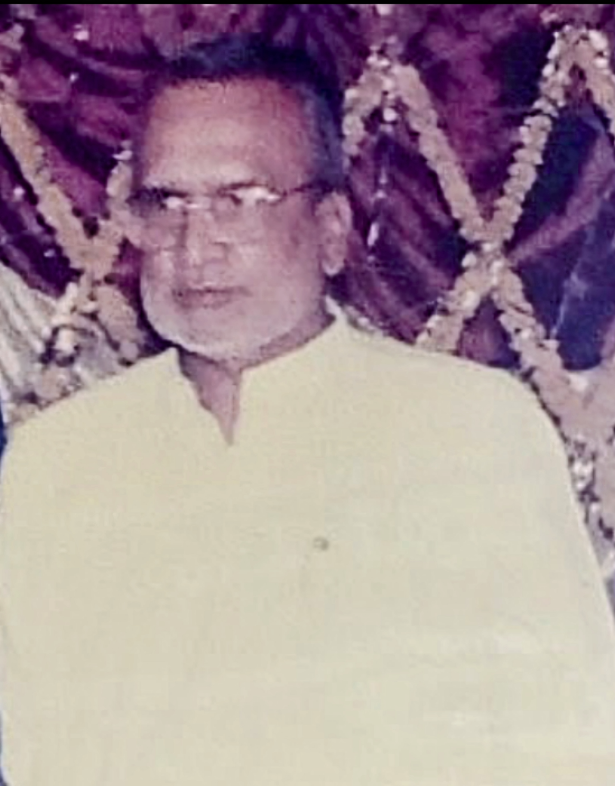
- Rameshwar Neekhra in 2001

Member of Parliament, Lok Sabha
- In office 1980-1989
- Preceded by: Hari Vishnu Kamath
- Succeeded by: Sartaj Singh
- Constituency: Hoshangabad, Madhya Pradesh

Personal details
- Born: 9 July 1946 (age 79) Paloha, Gadarwara Tehsil, Narsinghpur district, British India (now Madhya Pradesh, India)
- Party: Indian National Congress
- Spouse: Rama Devi Neekhra

Rameshwar Neekhra also spelt Nikhra is an Indian politician. Neekhra is a cousin of veteran Bollywood actor Ashutosh Rana. He is a Law graduate. He was elected to the Lower House of Parliament the Lok Sabha 7th and 8th Lok Sabha two consecutive terms from Hoshangabad, Madhya Pradesh, India as a member of the Indian National Congress. He was Chairman of Madhya Pradesh State Bar Council for over a decade. National Vice-President of Seva Dal from 1987 to 1989, President of Madhya Pradesh Youth Congress 1985–1987, University President of Student Union at Dr Hari Singh Gour University 1968-1970 Founder member of Shikshak Congress and Currently Senior Vice-President of Madhya Pradesh Congress Committee.

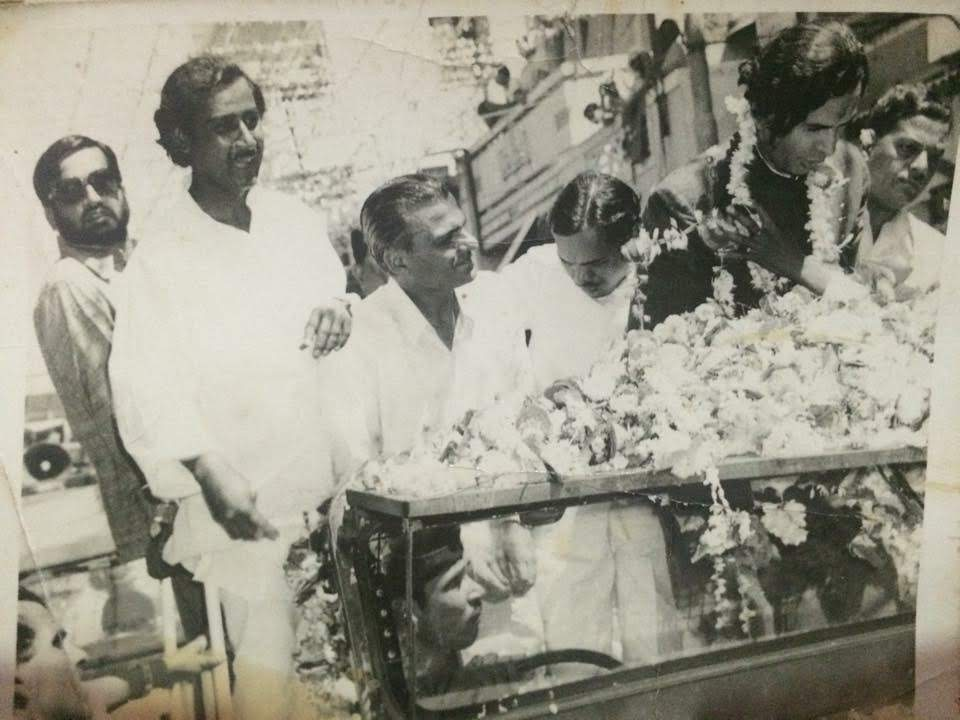
Rameshwar Nikhra, alongside the then Home Minister Narayan Prasad Shukla, the then Chief Minister of Madhya Pradesh Shyama Charan Shukla, and Mahesh Joshi during a public event.
