= Gadarwara Assembly constituency =

Constituency of the Madhya Pradesh legislative assembly in India

Coordinates: 22.92°N 78.78°E

Gadarwara
- Constituency No. 121 for the Madhya Pradesh Legislative Assembly

Constituency details
- Country: India
- Region: Central India
- State: Madhya Pradesh
- District: Narsinghpur
- Lok Sabha constituency: Narmadapuram
- Established: 1951
- Reservation: None

Member of Legislative Assembly
- 16th Madhya Pradesh Legislative Assembly
- Incumbent Rao Uday Pratap Singh
- Party: Bharatiya Janata Party
- Elected year: 2023
- Preceded by: Suneeta Patel

Gadarwara is one of the 230 Vidhan Sabha (Legislative Assembly) constituencies of Madhya Pradesh state in central India.

It is part of Narsinghpur District. As of 2023, its representative is Uday Pratap Singh of the Bharatiya Janata Party.

== Members of the Legislative Assembly ==
Election	Name	Party
1952	Niranjan Singh	Kisan Mazdoor Praja Party
1957	Nabha	Indian National Congress
1962	Laxmi Narayan	Praja Socialist Party
1967	Shyam Sundar Narayan Mushran	Indian National Congress
1972	Hari Shanker Sthapak	Indian National Congress
1977	Nageen Kochar	Janata Party
1980	Nageen Kochar	Bharatiya Janata Party
1985	Naginchand Kapoorchand	Bharatiya Janata Party
1990	Naresh Kumar Pathak	Bharatiya Janata Party
1993	Dindayal Dhimole	Indian National Congress
1998	Sadhana Sthapak	Indian National Congress
2003	Govind Singh Patel	Bharatiya Janata Party
2008	Sadhana Sthapak	Indian National Congress
2013	Govind Singh Patel	Bharatiya Janata Party
2018	Suneeta Patel	Indian National Congress
2023	Rao Uday Pratap Singh	Bharatiya Janata Party

== Election results ==
=== 2023 ===
2023 Madhya Pradesh Legislative Assembly election: Gadarwara
Party	Candidate	Votes	%	±%
BJP	Rao Uday Pratap Singh	111,811	62.5	+21.57
INC	Sunita Patel	55,282	30.9	−19.85
BSP	Savita Bai Ahirwar	3,973	2.22	+1.49
Kranti Janshakti Party	Poonam Singh Bharve	1,667	0.93	
NOTA	None of the above	2,941	1.64	−0.76
Majority		56,529	31.6	+21.78
Turnout		178,896	84.05	+0.99
BJP gain from INC		Swing		

=== 2018 ===
2018 Madhya Pradesh Legislative Assembly election: Gadarwara
Party	Candidate	Votes	%	±%
INC	Suneeta Patel	79,342	50.75	
BJP	Gautam Singh Patel	63,979	40.93	
Independent	Arya Ravi Parihar	2,224	1.42	
Bhartiya Shakti Chetna Party	Omshankar Singh Rajput	1,708	1.09	
GGP	Rewaram Paranchey	1,634	1.05	
NOTA	None of the above	3,759	2.4	
Majority		15,363	9.82	
Turnout		156,332	83.06	
INC gain from		Swing		

=== 1952 ===
1952 Madhya Pradesh Legislative Assembly election: Gadarwara
Party	Candidate	Votes	%	±%
KMPP	Niranjan Singh	11,039	48	
INC	Babulal Jain	8991	37	

== See also ==
- Gadarwara
