= Mehara Gaon =

Mehragaon
- Village
- Location in Madhya Pradesh, India Mehragaon (India)
- Coordinates: 22.6239°N 77.7374°E
- Country: India
- State: Madhya Pradesh
- District: Narmadapuram

Population (2001)
  - Total: 4,306

Languages
  - Official: Hindi
- Time zone: UTC+5:30 (IST)
- Postal code: 461115
- ISO 3166 code: IN-MP
- Vehicle registration: MP

Mehragaon is a Village in Narmadapuram district in the Indian state of Madhya Pradesh.

== Demographics ==
As of 2001 India census, Mehara Gaon had a population of 4,306. Males constitute 52% of the population and females 48%. Mehara Gaon has an average literacy rate of 75%, higher than the national average of 59.5%: male literacy is 82%, and female literacy is 67%. In Mehara Gaon, 12% of the population is under 6 years of age.
