= Uday Pratap Singh (Madhya Pradesh politician) =

Indian politician

Minister for Transport and School Education Government of Madhya Pradesh
- Incumbent
- Assumed office 25 December 2023
- Chief Minister: Mohan Yadav
- Preceded by: Govind Singh Rajput

Member of the Madhya Pradesh Legislative Assembly
- Incumbent
- Assumed office 3 December 2023
- Preceded by: Suneeta Patel
- Constituency: Gadarwara

Member of Parliament, Lok Sabha
- In office 16 May 2009 – 3 December 2023
- Preceded by: Sartaj Singh
- Succeeded by: Darshan Singh Choudhary
- Constituency: Narmadapuram

Member of the Madhya Pradesh Legislative Assembly
- In office 2008 – May 2009
- Succeeded by: Bhaiyaram Patel
- Constituency: Tendukheda

President Of Janpad Panchayat Chawarpatha
- In office 1994–2000

Personal details
- Born: 9 June 1964 (age 62) Lolari, Madhya Pradesh, India
- Party: Bharatiya Janata Party
- Other political affiliations: Indian National Congress
- Spouse: Manju Rao
- Children: 2
- Education: Sagar University
- Occupation: Farmer
- As of 16 December, 2016

Rao Uday Pratap Singh Indolia (born 9 June 1964; Hindi pronunciation: [ʊd̪əj pɾət̪aːp sɪŋgʱ]) is an Indian politician and current Minister for Transport and School Education, Government of Madhya Pradesh. He was elected in the Indian Lok Sabha from Narmadapuram (Lok Sabha constituency) for 3 consecutive terms from 2009 to 2023. He is the current Member of Madhya Pradesh Legislative Assembly from Gadarwara. He won the 2014 and 2019 elections for Member of Parliament as a member of the BJP. He won 2019 Lok Sabha Polls from Narmadapuram Lok Sabha constituency with the record margin of 5,53,682 votes.

Uday Pratap Singh then contested 2023 Madhya Pradesh Assembly Election from Gadarwara Legislative constituency which he won by more than 56 thousand votes defeating sitting MLA Mrs Sunita Patel.

== Political career ==
Uday Pratap Singh was interested in politics from early age. He was first elected as MLA in 2008 Madhya Pradesh Legislative Assembly elections from Tendukheda. Shortly, after this he made candidate for Hoshangabad Lok Sabha constituency in 2009. He won the elections and became Member of Parliament from Indian National Congress, in 2009, but later joined the BJP. He then won the 2014 Lok Sabha elections and 2019 Lok Sabha elections from the same seat as a member of the BJP. He won 2019 Lok Sabha Polls from Narmadapuram with the record margin of 5,53,682 votes.

In the 2023 Madhya Pradesh State Assembly Elections, he contested from Gadarwara which he won by more than 56 thousand votes defeating sitting MLA Mrs Suneeta Patel. On 25 December 2023, he was inducted in Mohan Yadav ministry and handed over the portfolio of Minister for Transport and School Education, Government of Madhya Pradesh.

== Offices held ==
	Constituency	Tenure	Party
Member of Madhya Pradesh Legislative Assembly	Tendukheda	2008 - May 2009	INC
Member of Parliament, Lok Sabha	Narmadapuram	2009 -14	INC
Member of Parliament, Lok Sabha	Narmadapuram	2014 -19	BJP
Member of Parliament, Lok Sabha	Narmadapuram	2019 - 23 December	BJP
Member of Madhya Pradesh Legislative Assembly	Gadarwara	2023–present	BJP
