= Hari Vishnu Kamath =

Indian politician

Member of Parliament, Lok Sabha
- In office 1977–1980
- Preceded by: Chaudhary Nitiraj Singh
- Succeeded by: Rameshwar Neekhra
- In office 1962–1967
- Succeeded by: Chaudhary Nitiraj Singh
- In office 1952–1957
- Constituency: Narmadapuram, Madhya Pradesh

Personal details
- Born: 13 July 1907 Mangalore, Madras Presidency, British India (now Karnataka, India)
- Died: 1982 (aged 74–75)
- Party: Janata Party
- Other political affiliations: Praja Socialist Party

Hari Vishnu Kamath (13 July 1907 – 1982) was an Indian politician and member of the Constituent Assembly of India. He was elected to the lower House of Parliament, the Lok Sabha, from Narmadapuram (Hoshangabad), Madhya Pradesh, thrice. In 1952 and 1962, he was elected as a member of Praja Socialist Party. And in 1977, he was elected as a member of Janata Party. He was the losing candidate in 1957 and 1967.

Kamath qualified for the Indian Civil Service in 1938 but he left the job to join the independence movement and joined the Forward Bloc.

He was imprisoned at Seoni Central Jail in connection with the Freedom Struggle with Prabhudayal Vidyarthi and spoke strongly against the atrocities of British on his release.
