= Tendukheda, Narsinghpur =

Tendukheda
- Municipality
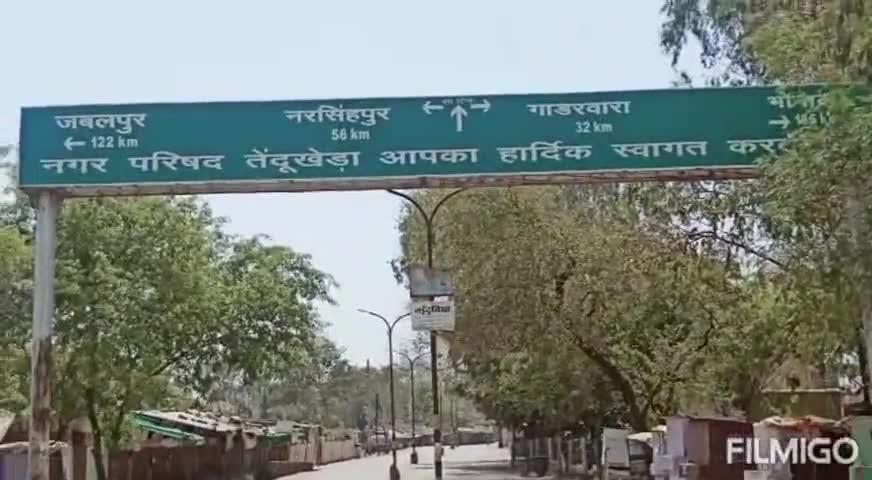
- Tendukheda Main Road

- Location in Madhya Pradesh, India Tendukheda (India)
- Coordinates: 23.17°N 78.87°E
- Country: India
- State: Madhya Pradesh
- District: Narsinghpur

Population (2011)
  - Total: 13,077

Languages
  - Official: Hindi
- Time zone: UTC+5:30 (IST)
- PIN: 487337
- Vehicle registration: MP-49

Tendukheda (Hindi: तेंदुखेड़ा) is a municipality and a nagar panchayat in Narsinghpur district in Madhya Pradesh, India. It is also a tehsil. Tendukheda in Narsinghpur is part of the Hoshangabad Lok Sabha constituency.

== Transportation ==
National Highway 45 (NH 45) connecting Jabalpur and Bhopal passes through Tendukheda.

== Demographics ==
As of the 2011 census of India, Tendukheda in Narsinghpur had an urban population of 13,077, and a total population of 94,919 including rural villages.

The municipality has a tyre shop and a police station. The Panchkalyanak Gajrath Festival celebrating world peace and spiritual goodwill was held in December in Tendukheda.

Jamupani Government Primary School is located in Tendukheda, Narsinghpur.

== See also ==
- Tendukheda Assembly constituency
