= Darshan Singh Choudhary =

Indian politician

- दर्शन सिंह चौधरी
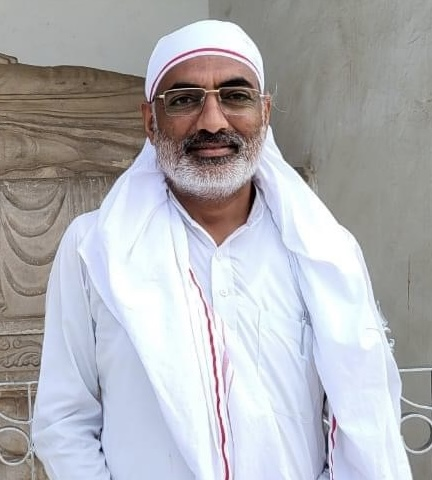

Member of Parliament, Lok Sabha
- Incumbent
- Assumed office 4 June 2024
- Preceded by: Uday Pratap Singh
- Constituency: Hoshangabad
- Majority: 431,696 (64.99%)

State President, Bharatiya Janata Party, Kisan Morcha

Personal details
- Born: 14 October 1977 (age 48)
- Party: Bharatiya Janata Party (2017–present)
- Education: Govt Hamidia Arts and Commerce College, Bhopal, Jawahar Navodaya Vidyalaya, Narmadapuram
- Profession: Agriculturist

Darshan Singh Choudhary (Hindi pronunciation: [d̪əɾʃən̪ sɪŋgʱ d͡ʒɔːd̪ʱ.ɾiː]) is an Indian politician and a Member of Parliament from Hoshangabad Lok Sabha constituency.

== Early life ==
Darshan Singh Choudhary holds a postgraduate degree in Philosophy, securing the top position with a gold medal from the university. He received his secondary and higher secondary education from Navodaya Vidyalaya and his graduation from Govt Hamidia Arts and Commerce College, Bhopal.

Currently, he serves as the supervisor of the Navodayan Student Organization.

== Political career ==
Darshan Singh Choudhary joined the Bharatiya Janata Party in 2017 and was announced and won as the candidate for Hoshangabad Lok Sabha constituency for the 2024 Indian general election. He defeated INC candidate Sanjay Sharma by a margin of 431696 votes.
