= Bankhedi railway station =

Railway station in Madhya Pradesh, India

Bankhedi

General information
- Location: Bankhedi, Narmadapuram district, Madhya Pradesh; India
- Coordinates: 22°46′30″N 78°32′01″E
- Elevation: 353 metres (1,158 ft)
- System: Indian Railways station
- Owner: Indian Railways
- Operator: West Central Railway
- Line: Jabalpur–Bhusaval section
- Platforms: 2
- Tracks: 2

Construction
- Structure type: Standard (on ground)
- Parking: Yes

Other information
- Status: Functioning
- Station code: BKH
- Zone(s): West Central Railway
- Division(s): Jabalpur
Location
- Location within India Location within Madhya Pradesh

Bankhedi railway station is a railway station in Narmadapuram district of Madhya Pradesh. Its code is BKH. It serves Bankhedi town. The station consists of two platforms. Passenger, Express and Superfast trains halt here.

== Structure ==
It is located at 353 m above sea level and has two platforms.

== Major trains ==
- Amravati–Jabalpur Superfast Express
- Janta Express
- Amarkantak Express
- Vindhyachal Express
