= Makhanlal Chaturvedi =

Indian writer (1889–1969)

Pandit Makhanlal Chaturvedi
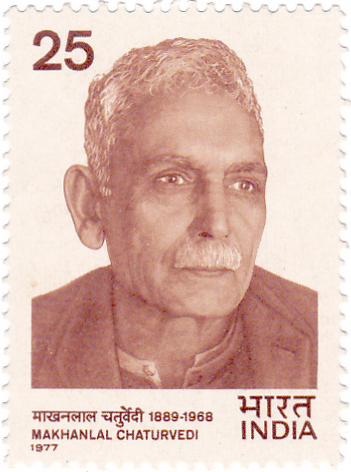
- Born: 4 April 1889; Babai, Central Provinces, British India (present-day Makhan Nagar, Madhya Pradesh, India)
- Died: 30 January 1968 (aged 78); Bhopal, Madhya Pradesh, India
- Occupations: Writer, Essayist, Poet, Playwright, Journalist
- Writing career
- Period: Chhayavaad
- Subject: Hindi
- Notable awards: 1955: Sahitya Akademi Award; 1963: Padma Bhushan

Pandit Makhanlal Chaturvedi (4 April 1889 – 30 January 1968), also called Pandit ji, was an Indian poet, writer, essayist, playwright and who is particularly remembered for his participation in India's national struggle for independence and his contribution to Chhayavaad, the Neo-romanticism movement of Hindi literature. He was awarded the first Sahitya Akademi Award in Hindi for his work Him Tarangini in 1955. The Government of India awarded him the civilian honour of the Padma Bhushan in 1963. For his works reinforcing Indian nationalism during the British Raj, he is referred to as the Yug Charan.

== Early life ==
Chaturvedi was born in a Gaur Brahmin family of babai gav (Makhan Puram) village of Narmadapuram district of Madhya Pradesh on 4 April 1889. He became a schoolteacher when he was aged 16. Later, he was the editor of the nationalist journals Prabha, Pratap and Karmaveer, and was repeatedly incarcerated during the British Raj. After the Indian independence, he refrained from seeking a position in the government, instead continuing to speak and write against social evils and in support of an exploitation-free, equitable society as envisioned by Mahatma Gandhi.

== Literary career ==
His noted works are Him Kirtini (Hindi: हिम कीर्तिनी), Him Tarangini (Hindi: हिम तरंगिणी), Yug Charan (Hindi: युग चारण), and Sahitya Devata (Hindi: साहित्य देवता), and his most noted poems are Venu Lo Gunje Dhara (Hindi: वेणु लो गू़ँजे धरा), Deep Se Deep Jale (Hindi: दीप से दीप जले), Kaisa Chhand Banaa Deti hai (Hindi: कैसा छन्द बना देती है), Agnipath and Pushp ki Abhilaashaa (Hindi: पुष्प की अभिलाषा).

== Legacy ==
In his memory, the Madhya Pradesh Sahitya Akademi (Madhya Pradesh Cultural Council) organizes the annual Makhanlal Chaturvedi Samaroh, since 1987, besides awarding the annual Makhanlal Chaturvedi Puraskar for excellence in poetry by an Indian poet.

The Makhanlal Chaturvedi Rashtriya Patrakarita Vishwavidyalaya at Bhopal in Madhya Pradesh has been named in his honour.

== See also ==
- Makhanlal Chaturvedi National University of Journalism and Communication
