= Sohagpur =

- Town
- Location in Madhya Pradesh, India Sohagpur (India)
- Coordinates: 22.7°N 78.2°E
- Country: India
- State: Madhya Pradesh
- District: Narmadapuram

Government
  - Type: Democratic
  - Body: MLA and Mayor
  - Mayor: Santosh Malviya
  - MLA: Vijaypal Singh
- Elevation: 323 m (1,060 ft)

Population (2011)
  - Total: 25,040

Languages
  - Official: Hindi
- Time zone: UTC+5:30 (IST)
- PIN: 461771
- Telephone code: 07575
- Vehicle registration: MP 05

Sohagpur is a town and a nagar panchayat in Narmadapuram district in the Indian state of Madhya Pradesh. It is one of the subdivisions and development blocks in Narmadapuram district. Sohagpur is also one of the legislative constituencies of Madhya Pradesh. Sohagpur is famour for its Betel culture, and an enormous quantity of betel is exported from here.

== History ==
Sohagpur is also known as the capital of Gondvana Princely state ruled under Nawab Kavi Uz Zafar Alvi in British India. The town gets its name from Suhagpur-Sobhagyapur-Shonitpur. In Dvapara Yuga, it was the capital of the kingdom ruled by Banasura, the demon king who was a devotee of Shiva. He dueled with Lord Krishna and was killed and attained moksha. Every year, the famous Mahashivratri mela is organized here with great pomp and show.

== Geography ==
Sohagpur is located at 22.7°N 78.2°E. It has an average elevation of 323 metres (1059 feet). The area is generally flat terrain and full of natural sites like Madhai (मढ़ई). Palakmati is the local river here.

== Demographics ==
As of the 2011 Census of India, Sohagpur is a Nagar Panchayat city in the district of Narmadapuram, Madhya Pradesh. Sohagpur city is divided into 15 wards for which elections are held every 5 years. Sohagpur Nagar Panchayat has a population of 25,040, of whom 12,933 are males while 12,107 are females as per the report released by Census India 2011.

The population of Children in the 0-6 age group is 3,084 which constitutes 12.32% of the total population of Sohagpur (NP). In Sohagpur Nagar Panchayat, the female sex ratio is 936 against the state average of 931. Moreover, the child sex ratio in Sohagpur is around 918 compared to the Madhya Pradesh state average of 918. The literacy rate of Sohagpur city is 84.54%, higher than the state average of 69.32%. In Sohagpur, male literacy is around 91.06%, while the female literacy rate is 77.59%.

Sohagpur Nagar Panchayat has administrative jurisdiction over 5,291 houses to which it supplies basic amenities like water and sewerage. It is also authorized to build roads within the Nagar Panchayat limits and impose taxes on properties coming under its jurisdiction.

== Tourism ==
The places of interest near Sohagpur are Madhai, a wildlife sanctuary, which is about 20 km from Sohagpur and Pachmarhi, a well known hill station, which is about 72 km from Sohagpur.

Jamni saraovar is also a place of interest.

There are many hotels in Sohagpur as well as in Pachmarhi which are run by private and government bodies. MP tourism hotels and two private resorts/cottages are situated some distance from the central market. Anhonee, a warm water estuary, is approximately 50 kms from Sohagpur. There are 6 or 7 private hotels in Madhai.

== Transport ==
The nearest airport is Bhopal airport about 125 km from Sohagpur.

Sohagpur railway station is connected by rail route and roadways. Many trains also stop at Sohagpur Railway Station. Sohagpur railway station is about 50 km from Itarsi Junction.

To reach Sohagpur by bus or taxi, one needs to travel on state highway 22. This lies at a distance of 50 km from Narmadapuram and 125 km from Bhopal.

== Education ==
Sohagpur has a PG college affiliated to Barkatullah University, Bhopal. There is also an ITI and many schools, government as well as private.

College-

- Jawahar Lal Nehru Smriti Mahavidyalaya, Sohagpur

Industrial Training Institute-

- Govt. Industrial Training Institute, Sohagpur

School-

- Govt. S.J.L. Higher Secondary School
- Govt. Girls Higher Secondary School
- St. Patrick's Higher Secondary School
- Saraswati Higher Secondary School
- Vivekanand Public Higher Sec. School
- Gyan Sagar International School
- Friends Higher Secondary School
- Shri Guru Kripa Gyanarjen Vidhya Mandir
- Galaxy international public school
- Saraswati Gyan sthali school
- Narmadanchal Public School
- Meenakshi Nrithyalay Bharatnatyam Dance School.
