= Dolariya =

Village in Madhya Pradesh, India

Dolaria
- Town
- Location in Madhya Pradesh, India
- Coordinates: 22.59°N 77.63°E
- Country: India
- State: Madhya Pradesh
- District: Narmadapuram

Dolariya is a village in Narmadapuram District of Madhya Pradesh in India. Its also a Tehsil Headquarter. Dolariya is located on Harda Hoshangabad Road.

== Geography ==
Dolariya is located at 22.59°N 77.63°E. It has an average elevation of 323 metres (1059 feet).

== Demographics ==
Dolariya village has population of 4941 of which 2588 are males while 2353 are females as Census 2011.

== Transportation ==
Dolariya is well connected with road and railways. Here is a railway station 5 train halts on the station.
