= Makhan Nagar =

- city
- Location in Madhya Pradesh, India Makhan Nagar (India)
- Coordinates: 22.7°N 77.93°E
- Country: India
- State: Madhya Pradesh
- District: Hoshangabad

Government
  - Type: Nagar Panchayat
  - Body: Makhan Nagar Panchayat
- Elevation: 300 m (980 ft)

Population (2001)
  - Total: 14,587

Languages
  - Official: Hindi
- Time zone: UTC+5:30 (IST)
- PIN: 461661
- ISO 3166 code: IN-MP
- Vehicle registration: MP

Makhan Nagar (Babai) is a city and a nagar panchayat in Narmadapuram (Hoshangabad) district in the state of Madhya Pradesh, India.

== Geography ==
Makhan Nagar is located at 22.7°N 77.93°E. It has an average elevation of 300 metres (980 ft).

== Demographics ==
As per Census of India 2011 Babai Town has population of 16,741 of which 8,665 are males while 8,076 are females.

Religion in Makhan Nagar
1. Hinduism (93.3%)
2. Islam (4.12%)
3. Jainism (2.59%)

Babai Work Profile - Out of total population, 5,038 were engaged in work or business activity. Of this 4,335 were males while 703 were females.

== Attractions ==
It is also famous for its shrine of Hanuman, whose idol is said to have come from a Baodi stepwell beside the shrine.

Other places include the Ram Janki temple which is a Hindu temple of Rama in Dravidian architecture, and the Babai Farm, a farm of Mangoes, Jackfruit, etc. and is also famous for the Tridevi temple.

== Notable people ==
- Makhanlal Chaturvedi, Hindi Poet
