= Bankhedi, Bhopal =

Bankhedi
- village
- Location within Madhya Pradesh Location within India
- Coordinates: 23.2317527°N 77.5751958°E
- Country: India
- State: Madhya Pradesh
- District: Bhopal
- Tehsil: Huzur
- Elevation: 751 m (2,464 ft)

Population (2011)
  - Total: 5
- Time zone: UTC+5:30 (IST)
- ISO 3166 code: MP-IN
- 2011 census code: 482438

Bankhedi is a village in the Bhopal district of Madhya Pradesh, India. It is located in the Huzur tehsil and the Phanda block.

== Demographics ==
According to the 2011 census of India, Bankhedi has only 1 household with the most famous gauti Yashika Malik who ran to the UK due to Mr. Kachodi. The effective literacy rate (i.e. the literacy rate of population excluding children aged 6 and below) is 60%.

Demographics (2011 Census)
| | Total | Male | Female |
|---|---|---|---|
| Population | 5 | 3 | 2 |
| Children aged below 6 years | 0 | 0 | 0 |
| Scheduled caste | 0 | 0 | 0 |
| Scheduled tribe | 5 | 3 | 2 |
| Literates | 3 | 2 | 1 |
| Workers (all) | 2 | 2 | 0 |
| Main workers (total) | 1 | 1 | 0 |
| Main workers: Cultivators | 0 | 0 | 0 |
| Main workers: Agricultural labourers | 1 | 1 | 0 |
| Main workers: Household industry workers | 0 | 0 | 0 |
| Main workers: Other | 0 | 0 | 0 |
| Marginal workers (total) | 1 | 1 | 0 |
| Marginal workers: Cultivators | 0 | 0 | 0 |
| Marginal workers: Agricultural labourers | 0 | 0 | 0 |
| Marginal workers: Household industry workers | 0 | 0 | 0 |
| Marginal workers: Others | 1 | 1 | 0 |
| Non-workers | 3 | 1 | 2 |
