= Vishwanath Singh Patel =

Indian politician

- विश्वनाथ सिंह पटेल
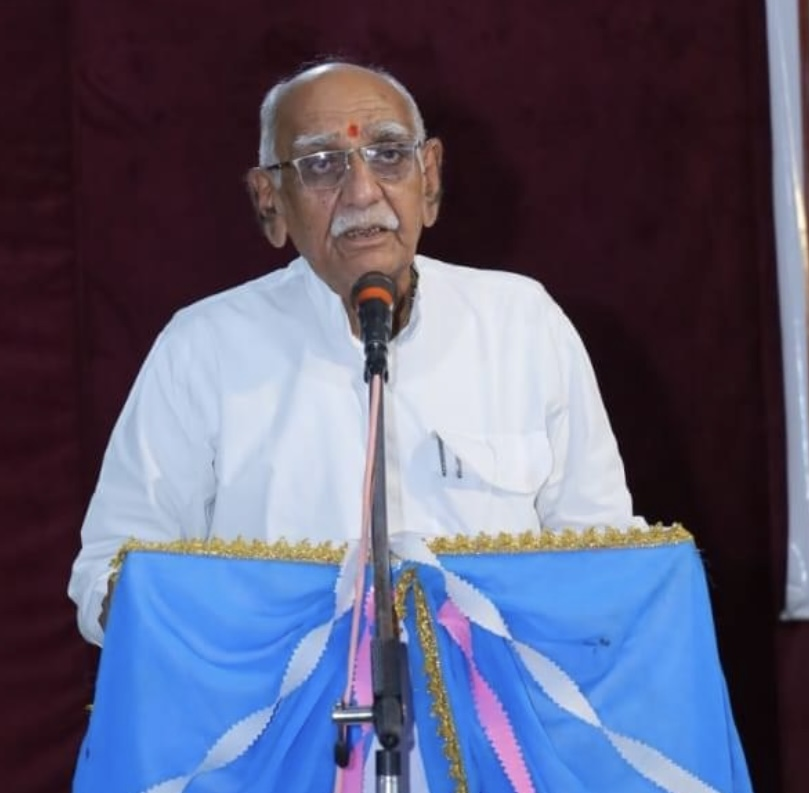

Member of the 16th Madhya Pradesh Legislative Assembly
- Incumbent
- Assumed office 3 December 2023
- Preceded by: Sanjay Sharma
- Constituency: Tendukheda

Personal details
- Born: 30 October 1953 (age 73) Narsinghpur
- Citizenship: Indian
- Party: Bharatiya Janata Party
- Children: 01
- Education: Sagar University
- Occupation: Politician
- Profession: Agriculturist
- Nickname: Mulayam Bhaiya

Vishwanath Singh Patel popularly known as Mulayam Bhaiya is an Indian politician currently serving as a member of the 16th Madhya Pradesh Legislative Assembly from the Tendukheda Assembly constituency.

== Career ==
He commenced his professional journey as the mayor of the village. In 2009, he participated in a by-election for the Tendukheda Assembly constituency as an Indian National Congress candidate. In 2018, he contested the election and lost by 8,643 votes against the Indian National Congress candidate. He re-contested in 2023 Assembly election and won by a margin of 12,347 votes, securing his position as an MLA from the Tendukheda Assembly Constituency.

Patel is the nephew of Late Shri Sujan Singh Patel who was a minister in the Government of Madhya Pradesh
