= Sadhana Sthapak =

Indian politician

Sadhana Sthapak (Hindi: साधना स्थापक) is a former MLA member from Gadarwara District Narsinghpur Madhya Pradesh seat. She has been in the MLA from 1998 to 2003. She was defeated by Govind Singh Patel in the 2003 Election. In the 2008 Election she was elected again for Madhya Pradesh Legislative Assembly Election 2008. She is member of Bharatiya Janta Party

Preceded by Deendayal Dhimole	MLA of MP for Gadarwara Seat; 1998-2003	Succeeded by Govind Singh Patel
Preceded by Govind Singh Patel	MLA of MP for Gadarwara Seat; 2008-2013	Succeeded by Govind Singh Patel
