= Sethani Ghat =

Sethani ghat
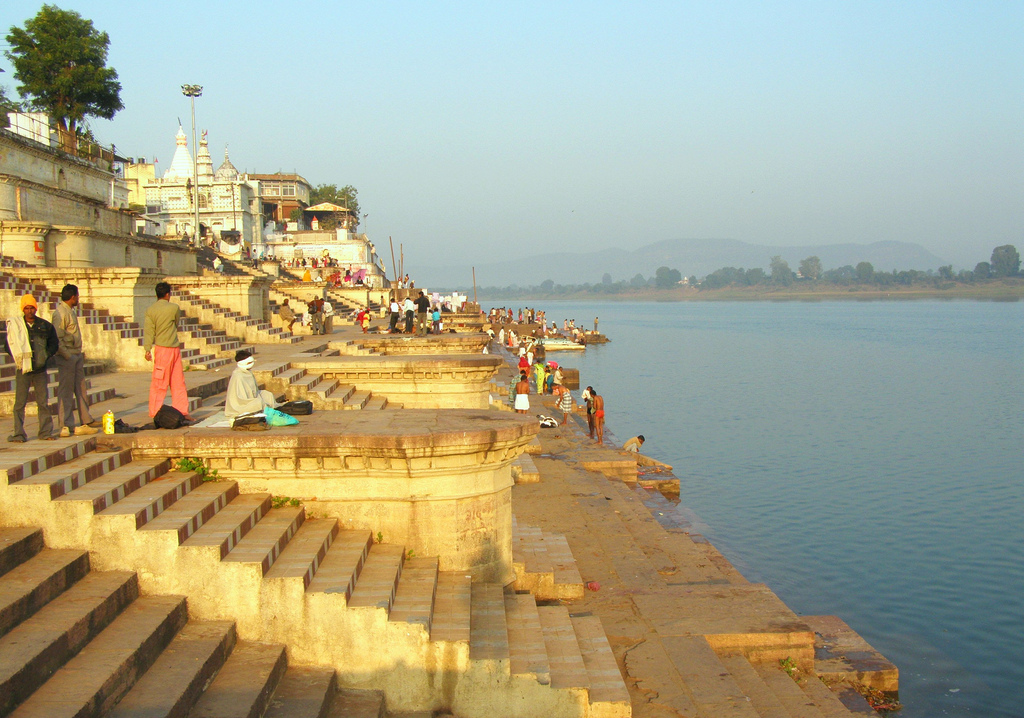

Religion
- Affiliation: Hinduism

Location
- Country: India
- Interactive map of Sethani ghat
- Coordinates: 22°45′45.541″N 77°42′59.411″E

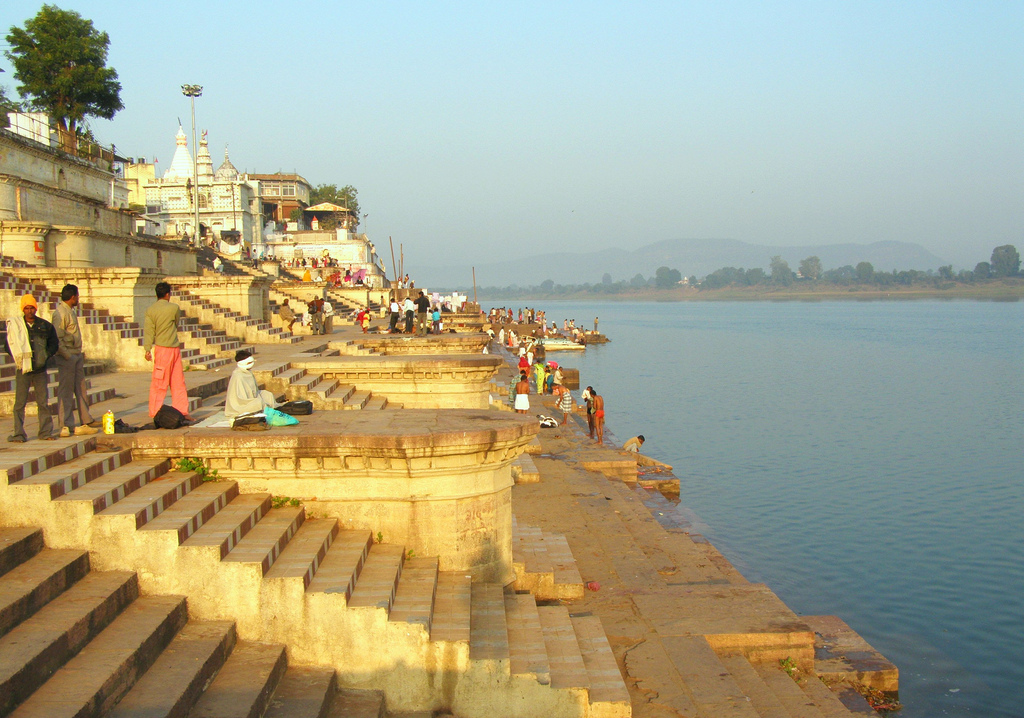
Sehtani ghat at Narmadapuram

Sethani Ghat is a 19th-century construction along the banks of the river Narmada at Narmadapuram in Madhya Pradesh in India. It is one of the largest ghats in India. During Narmada Jayanti celebrations the ghat comes alive when thousands of people converge on the ghat and diyas (traditional clay lamps) are floated down the river. The ghat was built after generous contributions by Jankibai Sethani from the Sharma family in Narmadapuram after devotees complained to her about the difficulty in getting to the river, hence the ghat is named after her. It is one of the few examples of public infrastructure built through private funding in India. A photo of Narmada from Sethani ghat can be seen in the book Jungle Rahe Taki Narmada Bahe!, by Pankaj Srivastava.
