= Tendukheda Assembly constituency =

Constituency of the Madhya Pradesh legislative assembly in India

Coordinates: 23.39°N 79.54°E

Tendukheda
- Constituency No. 120 for the Madhya Pradesh Legislative Assembly

Constituency details
- Country: India
- Region: Central India
- State: Madhya Pradesh
- District: Narsinghpur
- Lok Sabha constituency: Narmadapuram
- Established: 2008
- Reservation: None

Member of Legislative Assembly
- 16th Madhya Pradesh Legislative Assembly
- Incumbent Vishwanath Singh Patel
- Party: Bharatiya Janta Party
- Elected year: 2023
- Preceded by: Sanjay Sharma

Tendukheda is one of the 230 Vidhan Sabha (Legislative Assembly) constituencies of Madhya Pradesh state in central India.

It comprises Tendukheda tehsil, and parts of Gadarwara tehsil, both in Narsinghpur district. As of 2023, it is represented by Vishwanath Singh Patel of the Bharatiya Janta Party.

== Members of the Legislative Assembly ==
Year	Member	Party
1952	Raghuvir Gorelal Modi	Indian National Congress
1952-2008: Constituency did not exist
2008	Uday Pratap Singh	Indian National Congress
2009^	Bhaiya Ram Patel	Bharatiya Janta Party
2013	Sanjay Sharma	Bharatiya Janta Party
2018	Sanjay Sharma	Indian National Congress
2023	Vishwanath Singh Patel	Bharatiya Janta Party

^ bypoll

== Election results ==
=== 2023 ===
2023 Madhya Pradesh Legislative Assembly election: Tendukheda
Party	Candidate	Votes	%	±%
BJP	Vishwanath Singh Patel	83,916	51.61	+7.52
INC	Sanjay Sharma	71,569	44.02	−6.27
BSP	Rama Ashok Bhai Kushwaha	1,543	0.95	−0.01
Independent	Pramod Thakur	1,486	0.91	
NOTA	None of the above	1,389	0.85	+0.84
Majority		12,347	7.59	+1.39
Turnout		162,596	86.29	+4.11
BJP gain from INC		Swing		

=== 2018 ===
2018 Madhya Pradesh Legislative Assembly election: Tendukheda
Party	Candidate	Votes	%	±%
INC	Sanjay Sharma	70,127	50.29	
BJP	Vishwanath Singh	61,484	44.09	
Independent	Naresh Jatav	2,007	1.44	
Independent	Mukesh Mishra	1,634	1.17	
BSP	Kundanlal Suryavanshi	1,344	0.96	
NOTA	None of the above	9	0.01	
Majority		8,643	6.2	
Turnout		139,452	82.18	
INC gain from		Swing		
