= Bankhedi, Narmadapuram =

Town in Madhya Pradesh, India

Bankhedi
- Town
- Location in Madhya Pradesh, India
- Coordinates: 22.76°N 78.53°E
- Country: India
- State: Madhya Pradesh
- District: Narmadapuram district

Government
  - Type: Nagar panchayat

Population (2011)
  - Total: 13,667

Languages
  - Official: Hindi
- PIN: 461990
- Vehicle registration: MP 05

Bankhedi is a town and a Nagar Parishad in Narmadapuram District of Madhya Pradesh. It is also a tehsil headquarter.

== Geography ==
Bankhedi is located at 22.76°N 78.53°E. It has an average elevation of 323 m (1,060 ft). It is located in the Satpura Ranges and Narmada basin.

== Demographics ==
Bankhedi has a population of 13667 of which 7084 are males while 6583 are females as of Census 2011. There are a total of 2922 families residing in Bankhedi.

== Economy ==
The region is predominantly agrarian. Its people depend on farming and business. The main crops are wheat, maize and soybeans. There's some Industries located in the town a sugar mill operate in the town and a railway factory was manufactured Pre-stressed concrete monoblock sleepers, track sleepers, and turnout sleepers used for broad-gauge railway tracks.

== Administration ==
Bankhedi is divided into 15 wards for which elections are held every 5 years.

Bankhedi Nagar Panchayat has a total administration of over 2,922 houses to which it supplies basic amenities like water and sewerage. It is also authorize to build roads within Nagar Panchayat limits and impose taxes on properties coming under its jurisdiction.

== Transport ==
- Bankhedi railway station is on the Itarsi-Jabalpur rail line and is under the Jabalpur railway division.
