= Makhanlal Chaturvedi National University of Journalism and Communication =

State University in Madhya Pradesh

- Motto: ā nō bhadrāḥ krata vō yantu viśvataḥ
- Established: 1990; 36 years ago
- Affiliations: UGC, AICTE
- Chancellor: Governor of Madhya Pradesh
- Vice-Chancellor: Vijay Manohar Tiwari
- Visitor: Vice President of India
- Location: Bhopal, Madhya Pradesh, India; 23.215°N 77.338°E
- Campus: Urban
- Website: www.mcu.ac.in

Makhanlal Chaturvedi National University of Journalism and Communication (MCNUJC), also known as Makhanlal Chaturvedi Rashtriya Patrakarita Evam Sanchar Vishwavidyalaya or in short Makhanlal University (Mākhanlāl Viśvavidhālaya), is a public university in Bhopal, Madhya Pradesh, India. It is named after Makhan Lal Chaturvedi, a freedom fighter, poet and journalist, and was established in 1992 by the Madhya Pradesh Legislative Assembly. It is India's first university for journalism and mass communication.

The university is approved by University Grants Commission and is a member of the Association of Indian Universities and the Association of Commonwealth Universities.

== Location ==
The university has its main campus in Bhopal India. University has three campuses Datia, Rewa and Khandwa.

== Jurisdiction ==
Unlike conventional universities in India which have limited territorial jurisdiction, this university has nationwide jurisdiction.

== Academics ==
The university offers full-time programmes only, and does not offer any correspondence or distance education programmes/courses. It admits students based on national level entrance exams. The university has 11 academic departments and awards bachelor's, master's and PhD degrees.
