= Seoni Malwa =

- Town
- Nickname: Seoni-Banapura
- Location in Madhya Pradesh, India
- Coordinates: 22°27′3″N 77°28′5″E
- Country: India
- State: Madhya Pradesh
- District: Narmadapuram

Population (2024)
  - Total: 45,125
- Time zone: UTC+5:30 (IST)
- Postal codes: 461223,461221
- Vehicle registration: MP-05

Seoni Malwa is a town and a municipality in Narmadapuram district in the Indian state of Madhya Pradesh.

== Demographics ==
As of the 2011 Census of India, Seoni Malwa had a population of 86,195. Males constitute 52% of the population and females 48%. Seoni Malwa has an average literacy rate of 74%, higher than the national average of 59.5%: male literacy is 81%, and female literacy is 67%. In Seoni Malwa. 13% of the population is under 6 years of age.

== Transport ==
State Highway MP SH 15 passes through this city. National Highway 12 (India) is approx 60 km from Banapura and passes through Obedullaganj. National Highway 69 (India) is 35 km from Banapura via Narmadapuram. National Highway 59A (India) is 30 km from Banapura and is 23 km from Banapura and passes through Timarni and Harda. There are various villages that are connected with Seoni Malwa

Seoni Malwa is connected with Mumbai, New Delhi, Bhopal, Jabalpur, and other cities, via a broad gauge train route. A railway station is located at Banapura known as Banapura (BPF) Railway Station. Because of the high traffic in the city, a new bypass was constructed that is about 8 km long.
