= Sartaj Singh (politician) =

Indian politician (1940–2023)

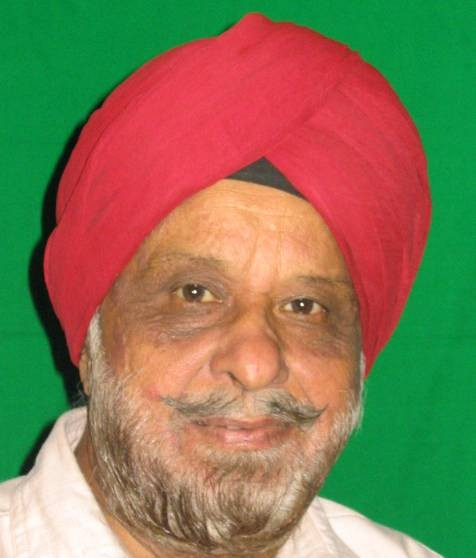

Member of Parliament In Lok Sabha
- In office 1989–1999
- Preceded by: Harpal Sethi
- Constituency: Narmadapuram

Personal details
- Born: 26 May 1940 Ujjain, Gwalior State, India
- Died: 12 October 2023 (aged 83) Bhopal, Madhya Pradesh, India
- Spouse: Gurmeet Kaur
- Children: 3
- As of 22 September, 2006

Sartaj Singh Chhatwal (26 May 1940 – 12 October 2023) was an Indian politician, who served as PWD minister in government of Madhya Pradesh. He was a member of the Lok Sabha of India in 2004. He represented the Narmadapuram constituency of Madhya Pradesh for four terms. Sartaj Singh was a longtime BJP member and even served as a minister in the Madhya Pradesh state government but on 8 November 2018, he joined the rival Indian National Congress party over denial of assembly ticket to him. He also served as Union Cabinet Minister, Health and Family Welfare from 16 May 1996 to 1 June 1996.

Sartaj Singh died in Bhopal on 12 October 2023, at the age of 83.

== See also ==
- Shivraj Singh Chouhan Third ministry (2013–)
- List of members of the Lok Sabha (1952–present)
