= Hoshangabad =

Hoshangabad Narmadapuram
- City
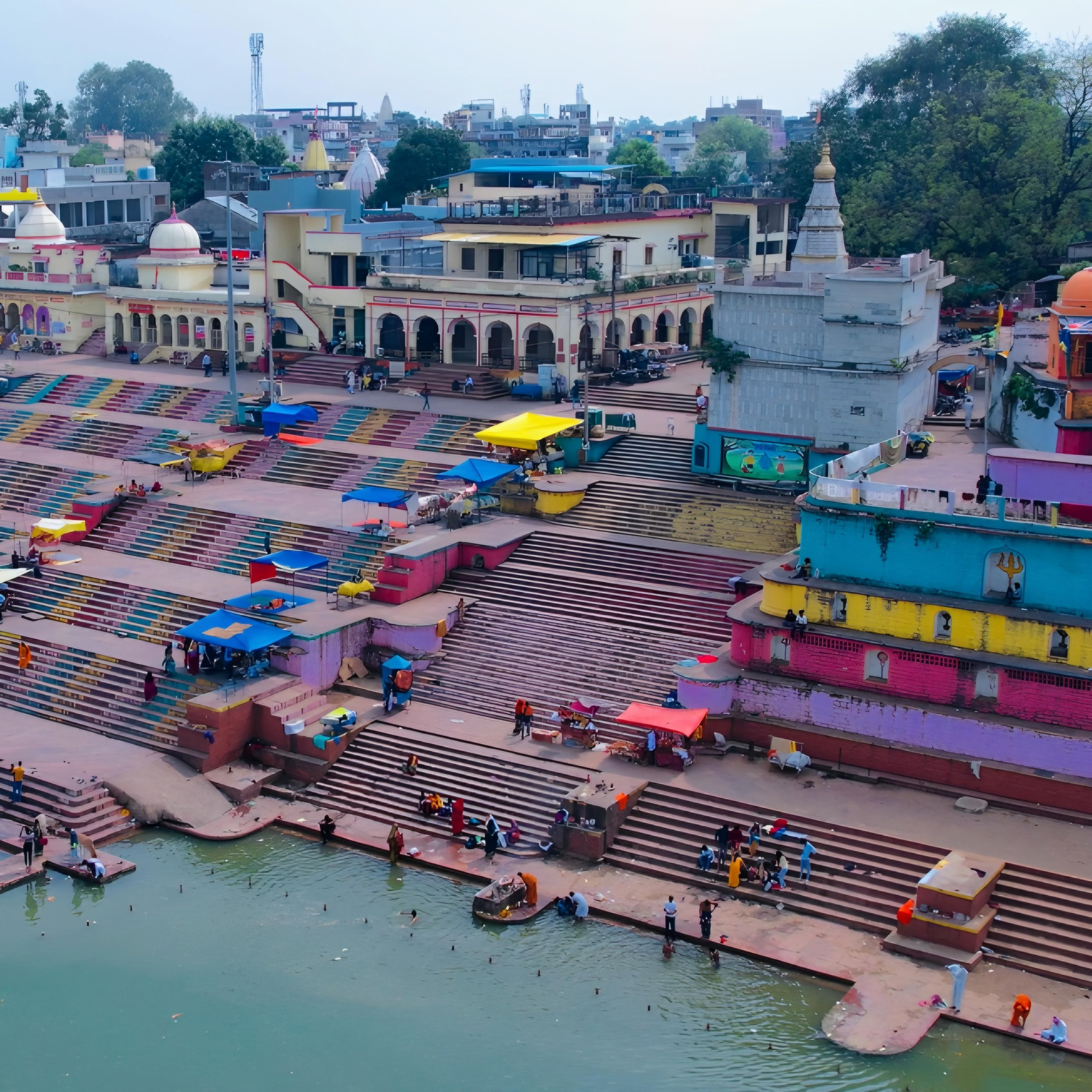
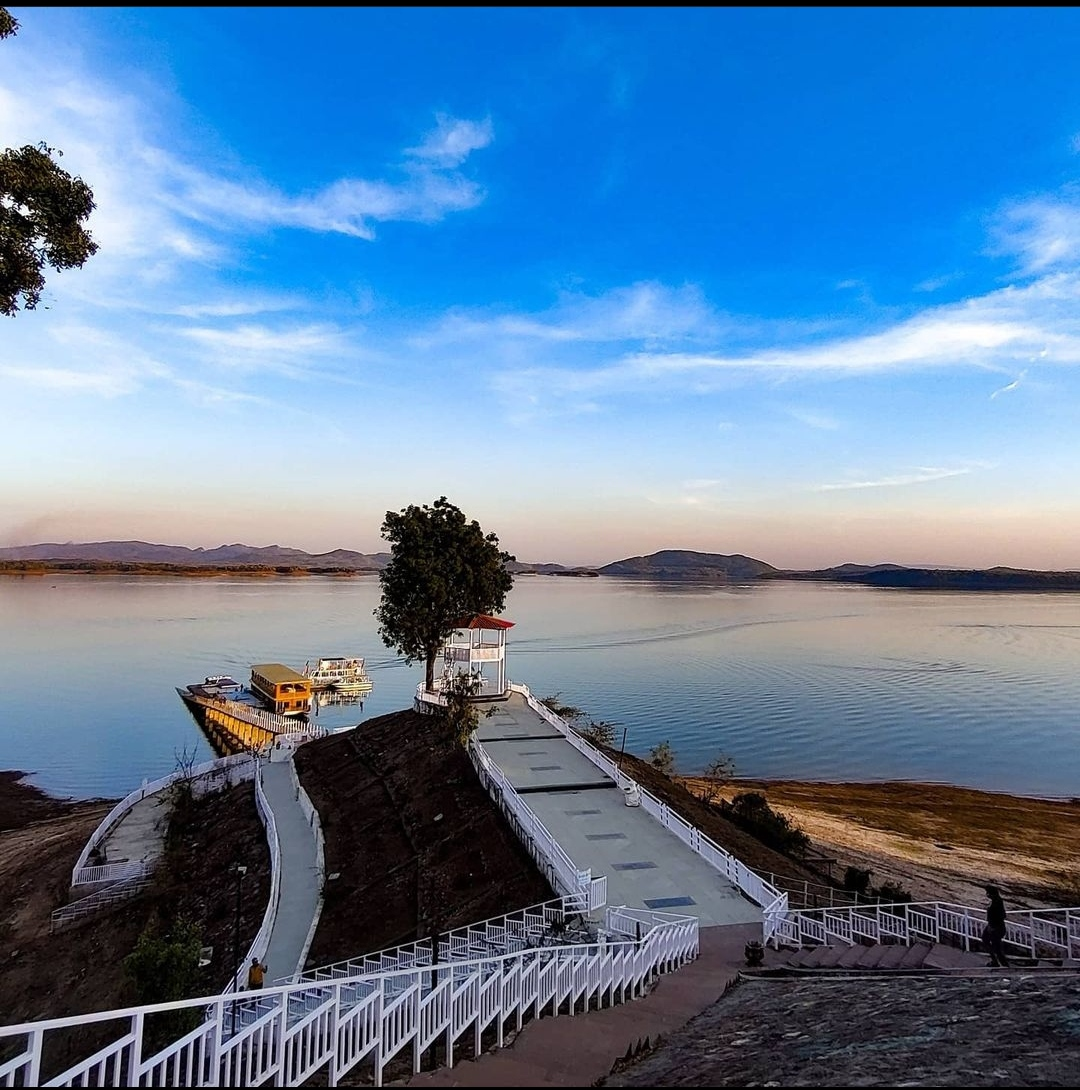
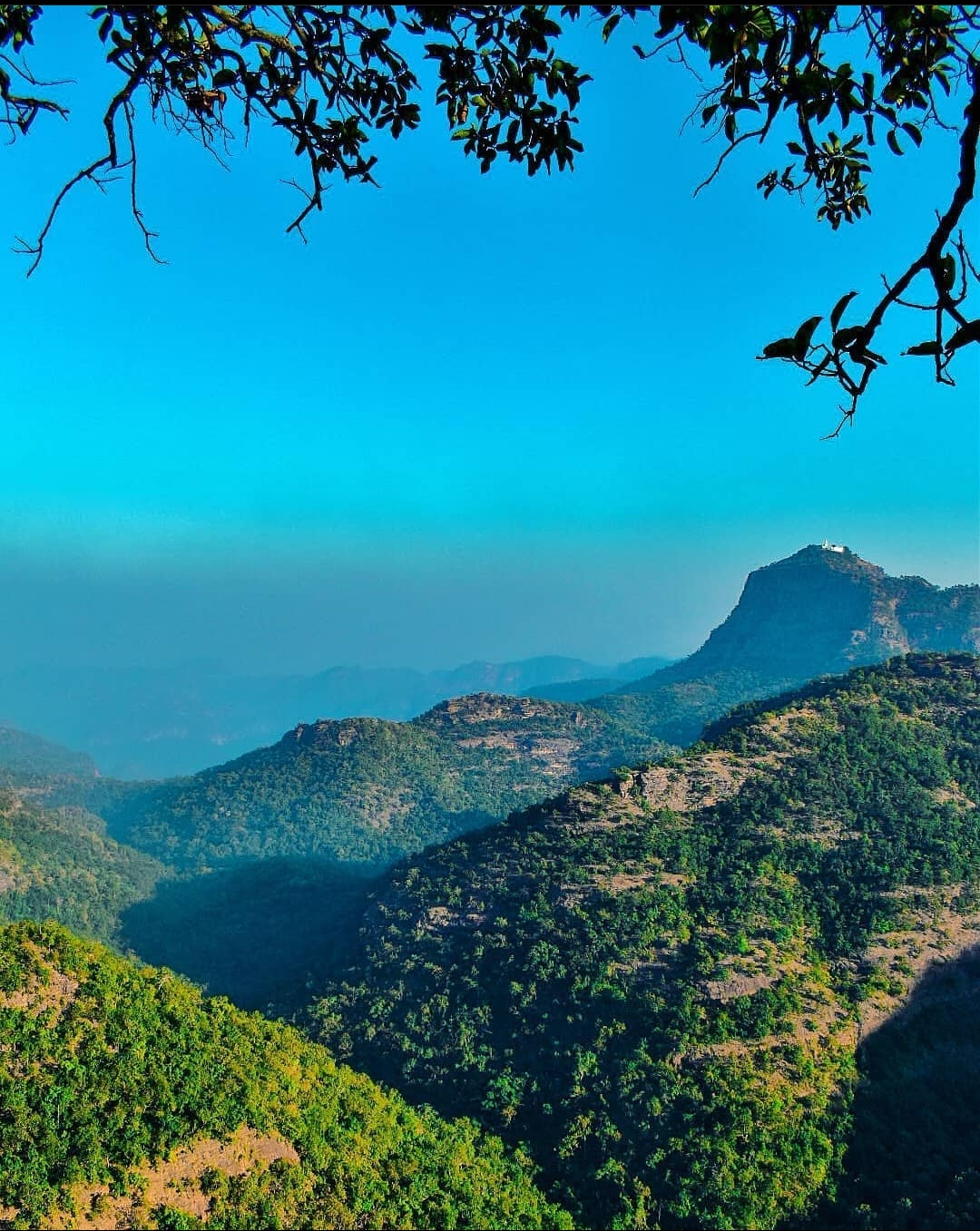
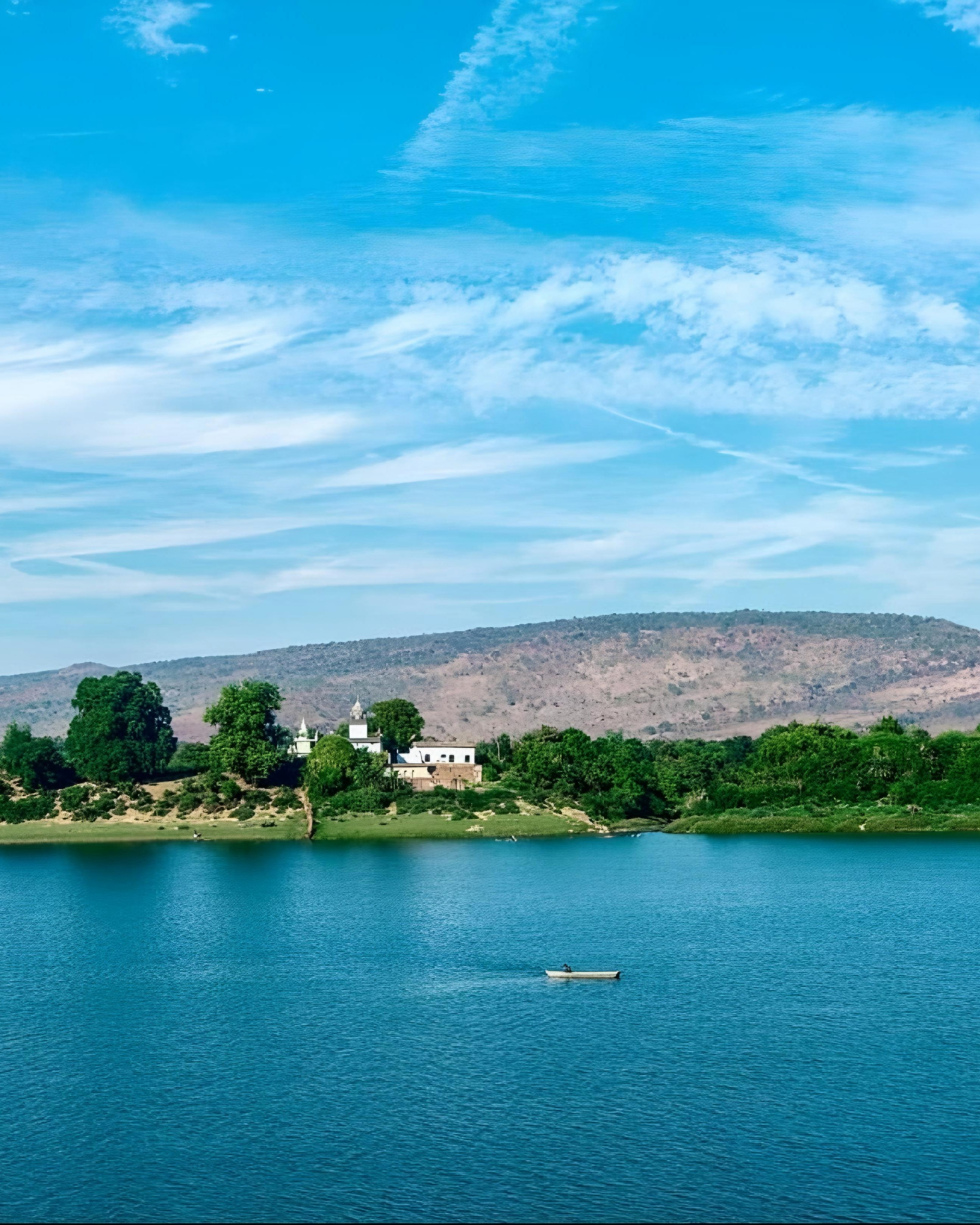
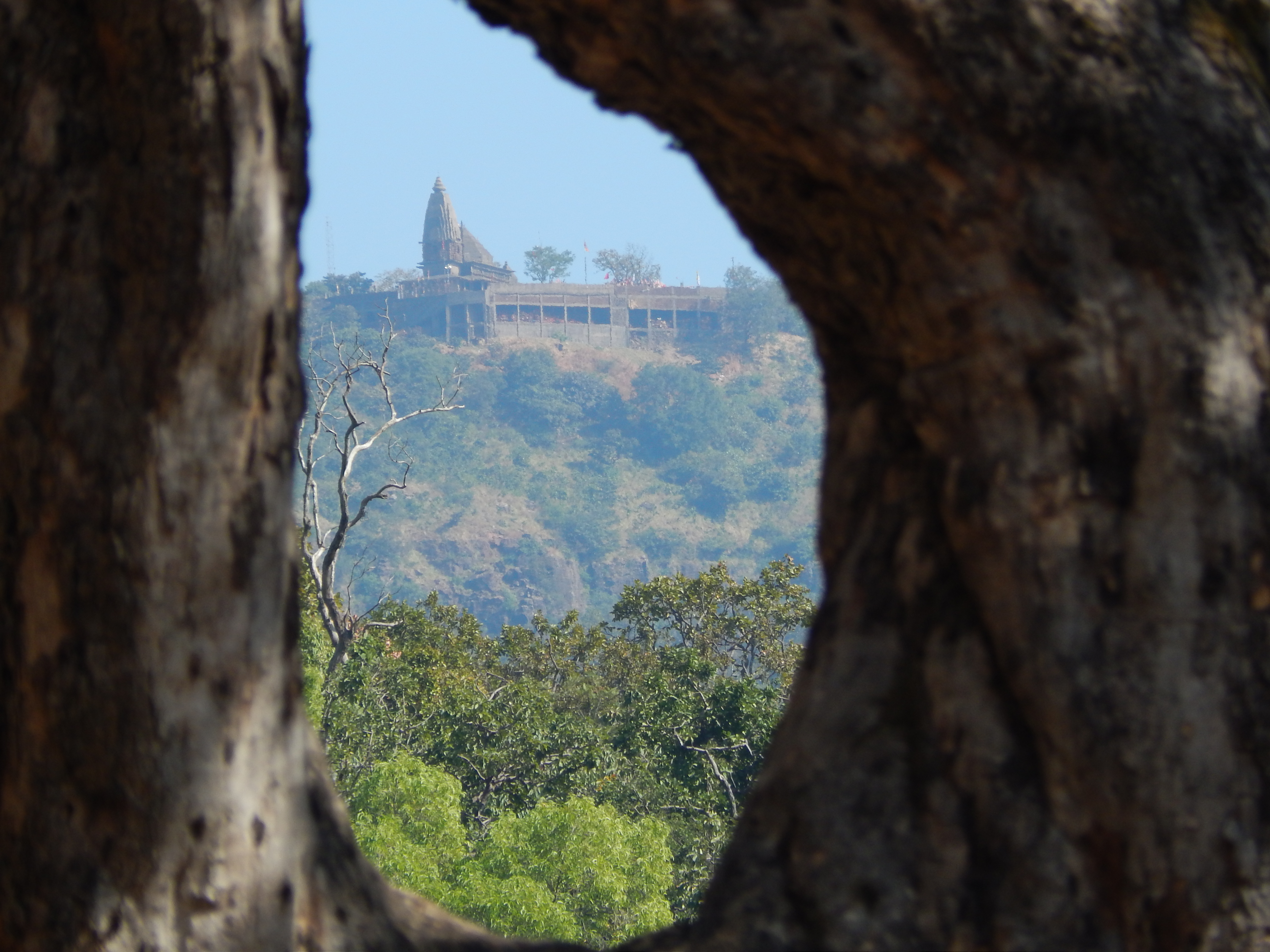
- Clockwise from top left Sethani ghat, Tawa Resort, Pachmarhi, Bank Of Narmada, Chauragarh Temple in Hoshangabad

- Location of Hoshangabad in Madhya Pradesh
- Coordinates: 22.75°N 77.72°E
- Country: India
- State: Madhya Pradesh
- District: Hoshangabad
- Ward: 34 wards
- Division: Narmadapuram
- Named for: Narmada

Government
  - Type: Mayor–Council
  - Body: Narmadapuram Municipal Corporation
  - Mayor: Sitasharan Sharma (BJP)
- Elevation: 278 m (912 ft)

Population (2011)
  - Total: 117,988
  - Rank: 17
- Demonym(s): Hoshangabadi, Narmadapuram Nivasi

Language
  - Official: Hindi
- Time zone: UTC+5:30 (IST)
- Pincode: 461001
- Telephone code: 07574
- Vehicle registration: MP-05
- Avg. high temperature: 31.7 °C (89.1 °F)
- Avg. low temperature: 18.6 °C (65.5 °F)
- Website: narmadapuram.nic.in

Hoshangabad (Hindi: IPA: [ɦoːʃə̃ŋɡɑːbɑːd]), officially Narmadapuram ([nəɾmədɑːəpʊɾəm]), is a city in the Indian state of Madhya Pradesh. It serves as the headquarters of both Hoshangabad district and Narmadapuram division. It is located in central India, on the south bank of the Narmada River. Hoshangabad is 76.7 km (47.7 mi) from the capital of Madhya Pradesh and the nearest airport Bhopal.

== History ==
The city was earlier called Narmadapur after the Narmada river. Later, the name was changed to Hoshangabad after Hoshang Shah Gori, the first ruler of Malwa Sultanate. Hoshangabad district was part of the Nerbudda (Narmada) Division of the Central Provinces and Berar, which became the state of Madhya Bharat (later Madhya Pradesh) after India's independence in 1947.

The city was renamed to Narmadapuram in March 2021.

== Geography ==
Hoshangabad is located at 22.75°N 77.72°E. It has an average elevation of 278 m (912 ft).

=== Climate ===
The climate of Hoshangabad district is typically that of Central India. Being close to the Tropic of Cancer, there is a hot, dry summer with maximum temperature of 40 - 42 degrees Celsius (April - June). This is followed by the monsoons with copious rainfall. The winters are dry and mild (November to February). An average height from the sea level is 331 m (1,086 ft) and average rainfall is 134 cm (53 in).

Climate data for Hoshangabad (1991–2020, extremes 1901–2020)
Month	Jan	Feb	Mar	Apr	May	Jun	Jul	Aug	Sep	Oct	Nov	Dec	Year
Record high °C (°F)	33.0 (91.4)	37.8 (100.0)	44.0 (111.2)	46.0 (114.8)	47.1 (116.8)	47.7 (117.9)	43.2 (109.8)	37.5 (99.5)	40.4 (104.7)	39.6 (103.3)	36.1 (97.0)	33.5 (92.3)	47.7 (117.9)
Mean daily maximum °C (°F)	25.8 (78.4)	28.9 (84.0)	34.8 (94.6)	40.0 (104.0)	42.0 (107.6)	37.8 (100.0)	31.1 (88.0)	29.5 (85.1)	31.9 (89.4)	33.5 (92.3)	31.0 (87.8)	27.9 (82.2)	32.8 (91.0)
Mean daily minimum °C (°F)	12.0 (53.6)	14.1 (57.4)	18.3 (64.9)	23.1 (73.6)	27.0 (80.6)	26.5 (79.7)	24.3 (75.7)	23.6 (74.5)	23.0 (73.4)	19.9 (67.8)	16.2 (61.2)	12.4 (54.3)	20.0 (68.0)
Record low °C (°F)	1.0 (33.8)	3.8 (38.8)	8.2 (46.8)	11.7 (53.1)	13.4 (56.1)	15.5 (59.9)	15.7 (60.3)	15.9 (60.6)	15.7 (60.3)	9.4 (48.9)	2.2 (36.0)	2.8 (37.0)	1.0 (33.8)
Average rainfall mm (inches)	7.9 (0.31)	13.4 (0.53)	7.3 (0.29)	4.6 (0.18)	11.6 (0.46)	138.5 (5.45)	451.0 (17.76)	419.9 (16.53)	214.8 (8.46)	27.4 (1.08)	13.8 (0.54)	4.3 (0.17)	1,314.5 (51.75)
Average rainy days	0.9	0.9	0.8	0.4	1.5	7.2	15.6	16.1	9.2	1.8	0.8	0.4	55.6
Average relative humidity (%) (at 17:30 IST)	50	40	27	19	23	48	75	83	72	53	50	47	49
Source: India Meteorological Department

== Demographics ==
As of the 2011 Census of India, Hoshangabad has a population of 117,988; including 61,716 males and 56,272 females. It has an average literacy rate of 87.01%, higher than the national average: male literacy is 91.79%, and female literacy is 81.79%.

Religions in Hoshangabad
Religion	Percent
Hinduism	75%
Islam	20%
Jainism	3.7%
Others†	1.3%
Distribution of religions †Includes Sikhs (0.2%), Buddhists (<0.2%).

== Notable people ==
- Raj Chandra Bose - mathematician
- Makhanlal Chaturvedi - poet, writer, essayist and playwright
- Manav Kaul - actor
- Praveen Morchhale - film director
- Harishankar Parsai - satirist and humourist of modern Hindi literature
- Nitiraj Singh - politician
- Nitesh Tiwari - film director
