= Hoshangabad district =

Coordinates: 22°40′N 77°30′E

Hoshangabad district Narmadapuram district
- District of Madhya Pradesh
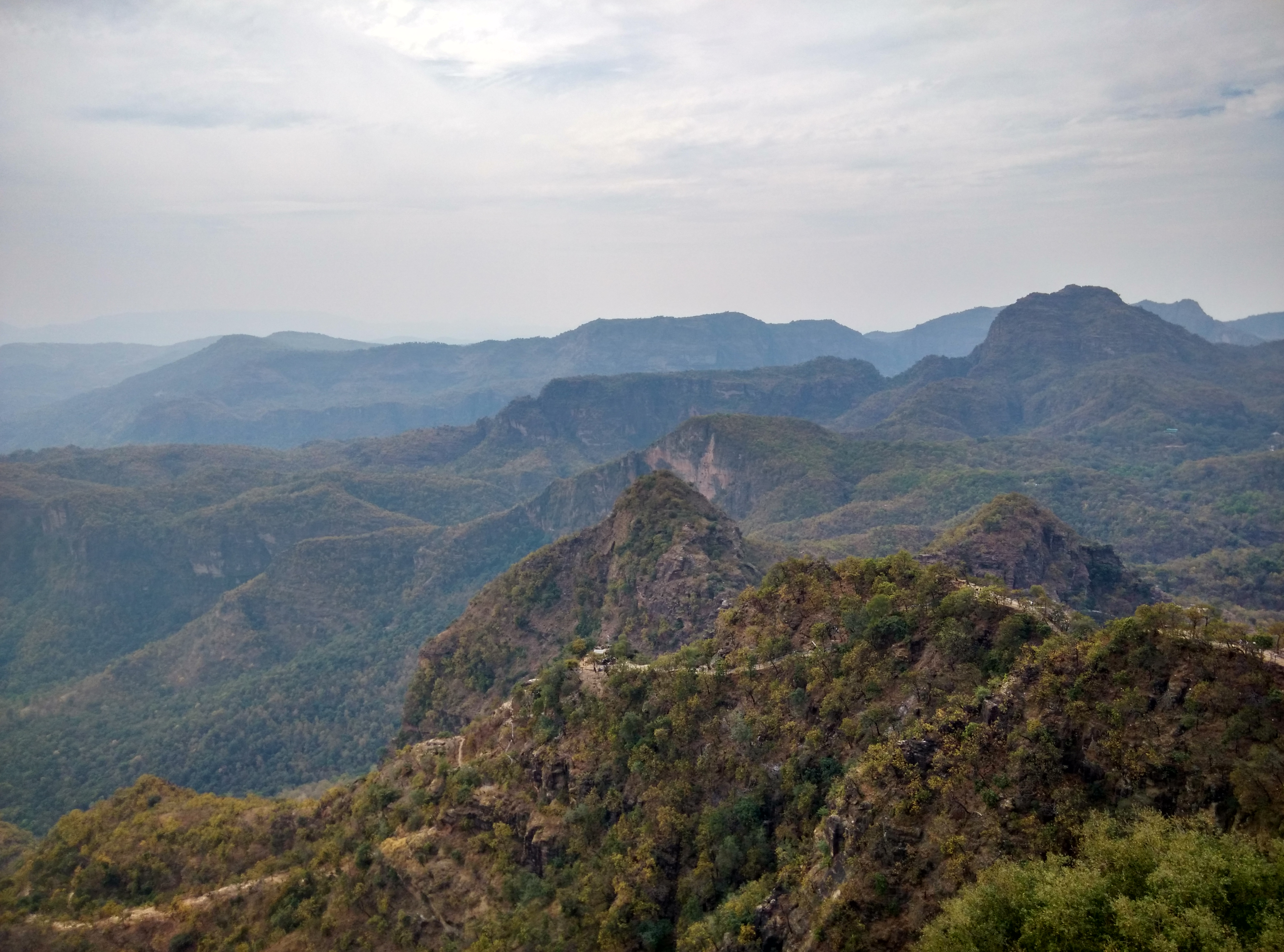
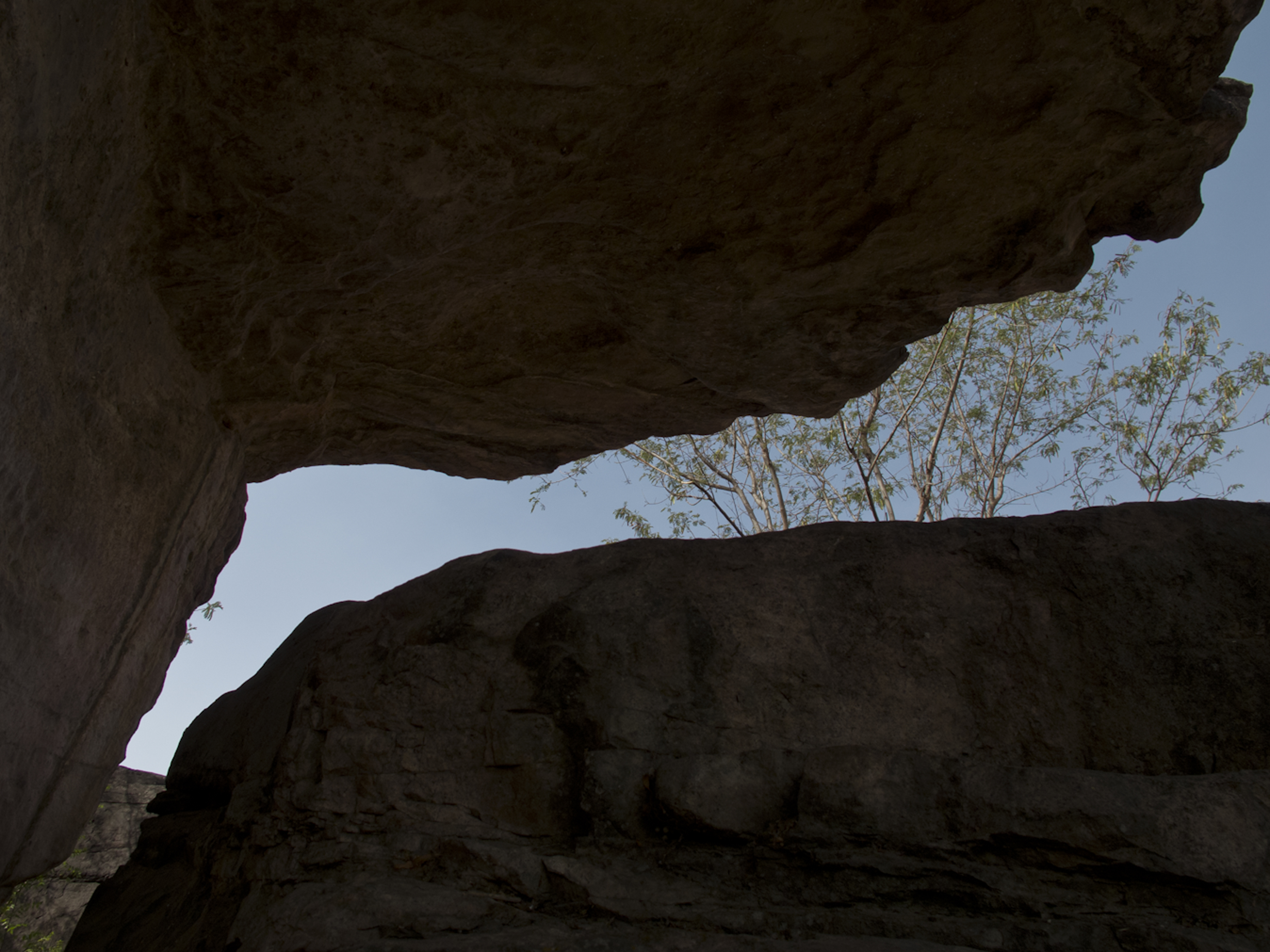
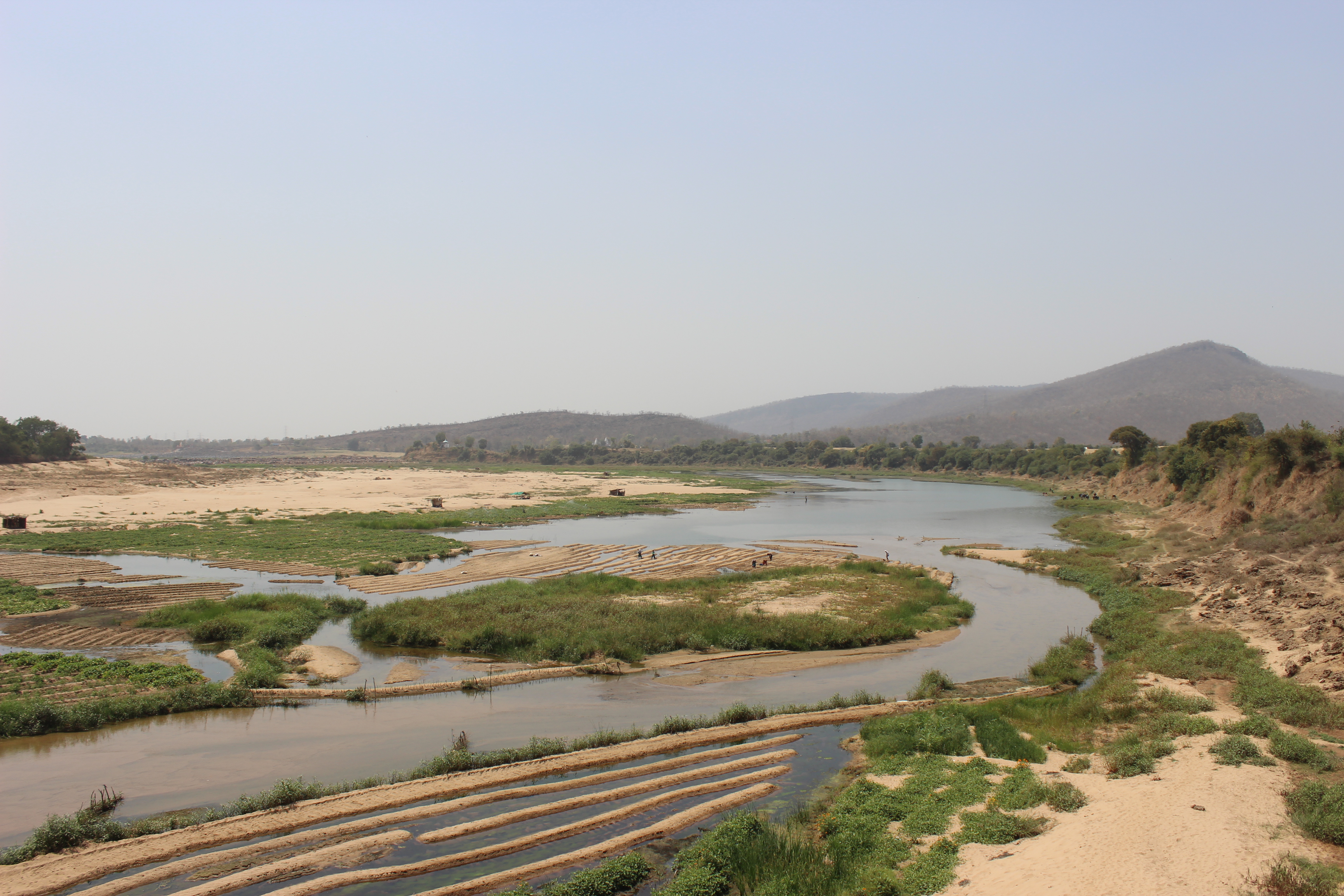
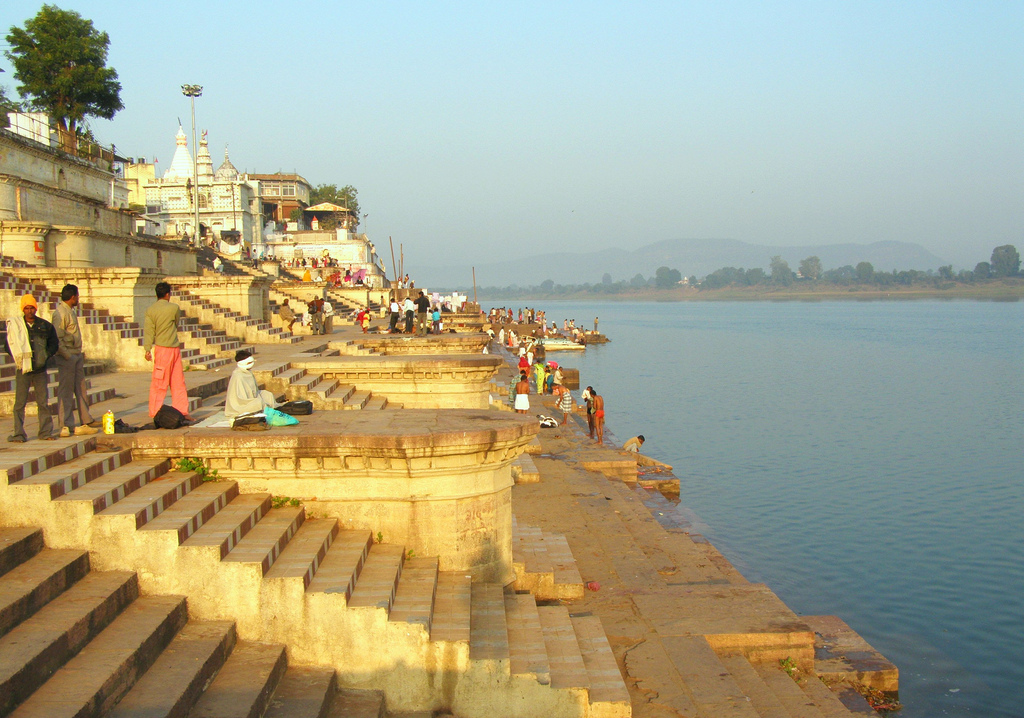
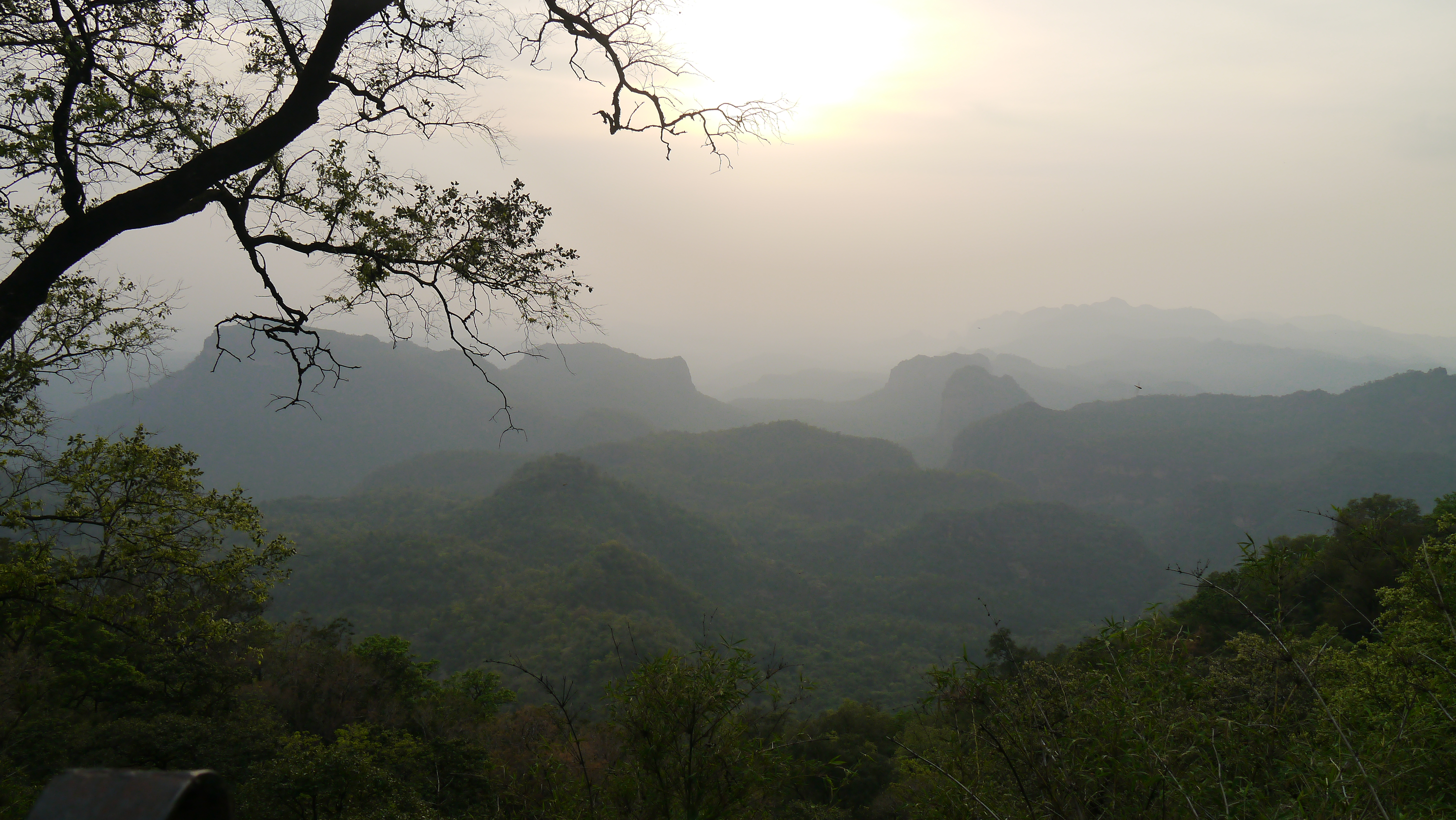
- Clockwise from top-left: Satpura Range at Chauragarh, Adamgarh Hills, Sethani ghat at Hoshangabad, Dhupgarh, Tawa River

- Location of Hoshangabad district in Madhya Pradesh
- Country: India
- State: Madhya Pradesh
- Division: Narmadapuram
- Headquarters: Hoshangabad
- Tehsils: 8 01 Itarsi 02 Hoshangabad 03 Seoni Malwa 04 Sohagpur 05 Makhan Nagar (Babai) 06 Bankhedi 07 Dolariya 08 Pipariya

Government
  - Lok Sabha constituencies: Hoshangabad
  - Vidhan Sabha constituencies: Hoshangabad, Seoni Malwa, Pipariya, Sohagpur

Area
  - Total: 5,408 km^{2} (2,088 sq mi)

Population (2011)
  - Total: 1,241,350
  - Density: 229.5/km^{2} (594.5/sq mi)
  - Urban: 35%

Demographics
  - Literacy: 76.52 per cent
  - Sex ratio: 912 females/1000 males
- Time zone: UTC+05:30 (IST)
- Major highways: NH69, SH15, SH19, SH19A, SH22
- Average annual precipitation: 1006~1350 mm
- Website: narmadapuram.nic.in

Hoshangabad district (Hindi pronunciation: [ɦoːʃəŋgaːbaːd̪]), officially Narmadapuram district (Hindi: [n̪əɾməd̪aːpʊɾəm]), is one of the districts of Madhya Pradesh state of India, and Hoshangabad city is the district headquarters.

== Geography ==
The district has an area of 5408.23 km^{2}. Hoshangabad district is bounded by the districts of Raisen to the north, Narsinghpur to the east, Chhindwara to the southeast, Betul to the south, Harda to the west, and Sehore to the northwest. In 1998, the western portion of Hoshangabad District was split off to become Harda District.

The district lies in the Narmada River valley, and the Narmada forms the northern boundary of the district, Hoshangabad District is part of Narmadapuram Division. The Tawa River is the longest tributary of the Narmada, rising in the Satpura Range to the south and flowing north to meet the Narmada at the village of Bandra Bhan. The Tawa Reservoir lies in the south-central region of the district.

Hoshangabad district is also home to Pachmarhi, a hill station and popular tourist spot in the Satpura Range in the southern part of the district. Pachmarhi was the summer capital of the British Raj Central Provinces and Berar.

The Pachmarhi Sanctuary (461.37 km^{2}) is part of the larger Pachmarhi Biosphere Preserve, which extends into Betul and Chhindwara districts.

The Rajat Prapat is located at Pachmarhi in Hoshangabad district. Bee Falls, Duchess Falls and Dupgrah, the highest peak of the Satpuras, are situated in Pachmarhi.

== History ==
Hoshangabad district was part of the Nerbudda (Narmada) Division of the Central Provinces and Berar, which became the state of Madhya Bharat (later Madhya Pradesh) after India's independence in 1947. Hoshangabad is also called Narmadapuram since it was previously named after the Narmada river, before being renamed after Sultan Hoshang Shah of Malwa.

== Demographics ==
Historical population
Year	Pop.	±% p.a.
1901	328,593	—
1911	337,601	+0.27%
1921	327,892	−0.29%
1931	358,908	+0.91%
1941	359,521	+0.02%
1951	363,758	+0.12%
1961	432,836	+1.75%
1971	567,305	+2.74%
1981	709,104	+2.26%
1991	886,449	+2.26%
2001	1,084,265	+2.03%
2011	1,241,350	+1.36%

Religions in Hoshangabad district (2011)
Religion	Percent
Hinduism	94.67%
Islam	4.21%
Other or not stated	1.12%

According to the 2011 census, Hoshangabad District has a population of 1,241,350, roughly equal to the nation of Trinidad and Tobago or the US state of New Hampshire. This gives it a ranking of 387th in India (out of a total of 640). The district has a population density of 185 inhabitants per square kilometre (480/sq mi) . Its population growth rate over the decade 2001-2011 was 14.45%. Hoshangabad has a sex ratio of 912 females for every 1000 males, and a literacy rate of 76.52%. 31.42% of the population lives in urban areas. Scheduled Castes and Scheduled Tribes make up 16.51% and 15.89% of the population respectively.

=== Languages ===
Languages of Hoshangabad district (2011)
1. Hindi (96.0%)
2. Gondi (0.97%)
3. Korku (0.96%)
4. Others (2.04%)

At the time of the 2011 Census of India, 96.03% of the population in the district spoke Hindi, 0.97% Gondi and 0.96% Korku as their first language.

== Economy ==
Hoshangabad is one of the fastest developing districts of Madhya Pradesh.

=== Agriculture ===
Agriculture growth is very high of the region. The land is quite fertile and farmers have good canal irrigation facilities from the Tawa Dam throughout the year. The farmers employ rotation of crops and their major income depends on Wheat, Soya Bean, Mung Bean, Sugarcane, Gram, Paddy cultivation etc. Hoshangabad is the largest wheat producer and one of the largest soya bean producer district in India.

=== Industries ===
There are lot of large and small scale industries(Oil mill, Sugar mill, Wooden, Engineering etc.). Itarsi is the largest economic center and logistic hub in the district. Security Paper Mill, Itarsi Electric Loco Shed and Diesel loco shed and Ordnance Factory, Itarsi are most valuable industrial units of Government of India. A food park has been established in Pipariya of the district, where several food processing plants work; along with this a solar plant is being established near Babai.

== Tourist places ==
Pachmarhi is known for its natural environment, and lies at an altitude of 3,555 feet. It is surrounded by the Satpura hills. Satpura National Park and Madai Tiger Reserve are wildlife.

== Transportation ==
=== Road ===
- National Highway NH69
- State Highways SH15, SH19, SH19A, SH22

=== Rail ===
Itarsi Junction is one of the largest and busiest Railway Stations in India. Approximately 350 trains from all over India pass through this station. Other Railway Stations are Hoshangabad, Pipariya, Banapura Sohagpur Bankhedi.

=== Air ===
The nearest airport is Raja Bhoj Airport Bhopal.

== Education ==
- Makhanlal Chaturvedi National University of Journalism and Communication

Total Literacy of the District : 54.11%

Male Literacy of the District : 67.19%

Female Literacy of the District : 39.29%

== Media ==
Newspapers: Hoshangabad has a few print publications newspapers such as, Dainik Bhaskar.

Television: Doordarshan Broadcasting Center in Itarsi Pipariya and Pachmarhi.
