= Collingsworth =

Collingsworth may refer to:

- Collingsworth County, Texas, a county in Texas, United States
- USS Collingsworth (APA-146), a Haskell-class attack transport of the United States Navy

== People with the surname ==
- Arthur J. Collingsworth (1944–2013), American United Nations official
