= Valentin Aleskovsky =

Soviet scientist and administrator (1912–2006)

- Born: Valentin Borisovich Aleskovsky; 3 June 1912; Mary, Russian Empire
- Died: 29 January 2006 (aged 93); St. Petersburg, Russia
- Education: Leningrad Technological Institute
- Known for: Atomic layer deposition
- Scientific career
- Fields: Materials Science
- Thesis: Matrix hypothesis and way of synthesis of some active solid compounds (Остовная гипотеза и опыт приготовления некоторых активных твердых тел. Диссертацию на соискание ученой степени доктора химических наук) (1952)

Valentin Borisovich Aleskovsky (Russian: Валенти́н Бори́сович Алеско́вский; 3 June 1912 - 29 January 2006) was a Soviet and Russian scientist and administrator known for his pioneering research on surface reactions underpinning the thin film deposition technique that years later became known as atomic layer deposition. He was the rector of Leningrad Technological Institute (1962-75) and of Leningrad State University (1975-1986).

== Biography ==
Aleskovsky was born in Mary, Turkmenistan, then part of the Russian Empire to the family of Boris Nikolayevich Aleskovsky and his wife, Anna Sergeyevna Aleskovsky. In 1931, after graduating from a secondary school he entered the "shift department" of the Leningrad Technological Institute where for each year he studied half a year and for the other half of the year worked as a worker of the experimental factory of the State Institute for Applied Chemistry.

After graduating from Leningrad Technological Institute in 1937 he worked for a year for the Research and Development Institute of Navy (НИИ военно-морского флота) and entered the graduate school of the Leningrad Technological Institute.

In 1940, he received his Kandidat degree (considered equivalent to PhD) for this dissertation "Active silica".

In June 1941, he was enlisted to the Red Army where he served as the Chief of the Chemical Service of the 891st Rifle Regiment of the 189th Division of the Leningrad Front. In 1943 he was wounded in the battle of Pulkovo Heights. After returning from the hospital he served with the 102nd Artillery Regiment. He participated in the battles over Pskov, Baltic states, Balkans, Hungary, and Czechoslovakia, and was awarded a number of military orders and medals.

From September 1945, he worked as an assistant professor at the Physical Chemistry chair of Leningrad Technological Institute. In 1949, he was named chairperson of the Analytical Chemistry chair of the institute. In 1965 he was appointed the rector of the Leningrad Technological Institute. In 1972, he was elected a corresponding member of the Academy of Sciences of the Soviet Union.

In 1975, he was appointed rector of Leningrad State University. In this role he supervised controversial movement of the science departments of the university to Petrodvorets. During his tenure as rector of Leningrad Technological Institute and the rector of Leningrad State University Aleskovsky was sending most of his time on administrative duties. He served as the chairman of the "Council of Rectors of Leningrad Higher Schools", he founded the Leningrad Section of the Soviet Academy Of Sciences.

== Molecular Layering - Atomic Layer Deposition ==
Aleskovsky's thesis in 1952 contains the so-called matrix hypothesis, which formed the basis for experiments with Koltsov and other co-workers, leading later to a thin film deposition technique they called Molecular Layering. Internationally today this technique is called atomic layer deposition.

This technique, which is based on the use of complementary self-limiting surface reactions to deposit materials in a layer by layer fashion, was later independently developed by Tuomo Suntola under the name atomic layer epitaxy.
