= Millennium Prize =

Millennium Prize may refer to:

- Millennium Prize Problems of Clay Mathematics Institute
- Millennium Technology Prize of Finland
