= Atomic layer deposition =

Thin-film deposition technique that deposits one 1-atom thick layer at a time

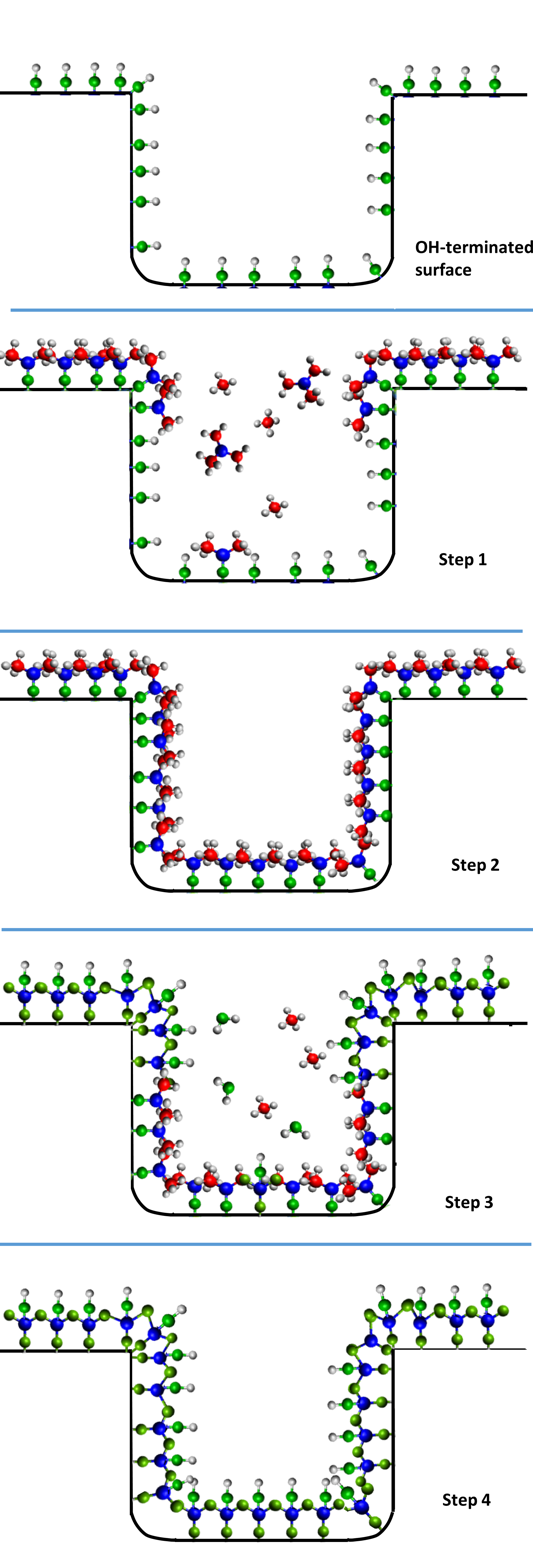
Schematic illustration of one reaction cycle of the ALD process, using the trimethylaluminium (TMA) -water process to make thin aluminium oxide films as (simplified) example. There, the starting surface contains hydroxyls (OH groups) as reactive sites; Step 1 is the reaction of TMA; Step 2 is a purge or evacuation step, Step 3 is the reaction of water, and Step 4 is a purge or evacuation step.

Atomic layer deposition (ALD) is a thin-film deposition technique based on the sequential use of a gas-phase chemical process; it is a subclass of chemical vapour deposition. The majority of ALD reactions use two chemicals called precursors (also called "reactants"). These precursors react with the surface of a material one at a time in a sequential, self-limiting, manner. A thin film is slowly deposited through repeated exposure to separate precursors. ALD is a key process in fabricating semiconductor devices, and part of the set of tools for synthesizing nanomaterials.

== Introduction ==
During atomic layer deposition, a film is grown on a substrate by exposing its surface to alternate gaseous species (typically referred to as precursors or reactants). In contrast to chemical vapor deposition, the precursors are never present simultaneously in the reactor, but they are inserted as a series of sequential, non-overlapping pulses. In each of these pulses the precursor molecules react with the surface in a self-limiting way, so that the reaction terminates once all the available sites on the surface are consumed. Consequently, the maximum amount of material deposited on the surface after a single exposure to all of the precursors (a so-called ALD cycle) is determined by the nature of the precursor-surface interaction. By varying the number of cycles it is possible to grow materials uniformly and with high precision on arbitrarily complex and large substrates.

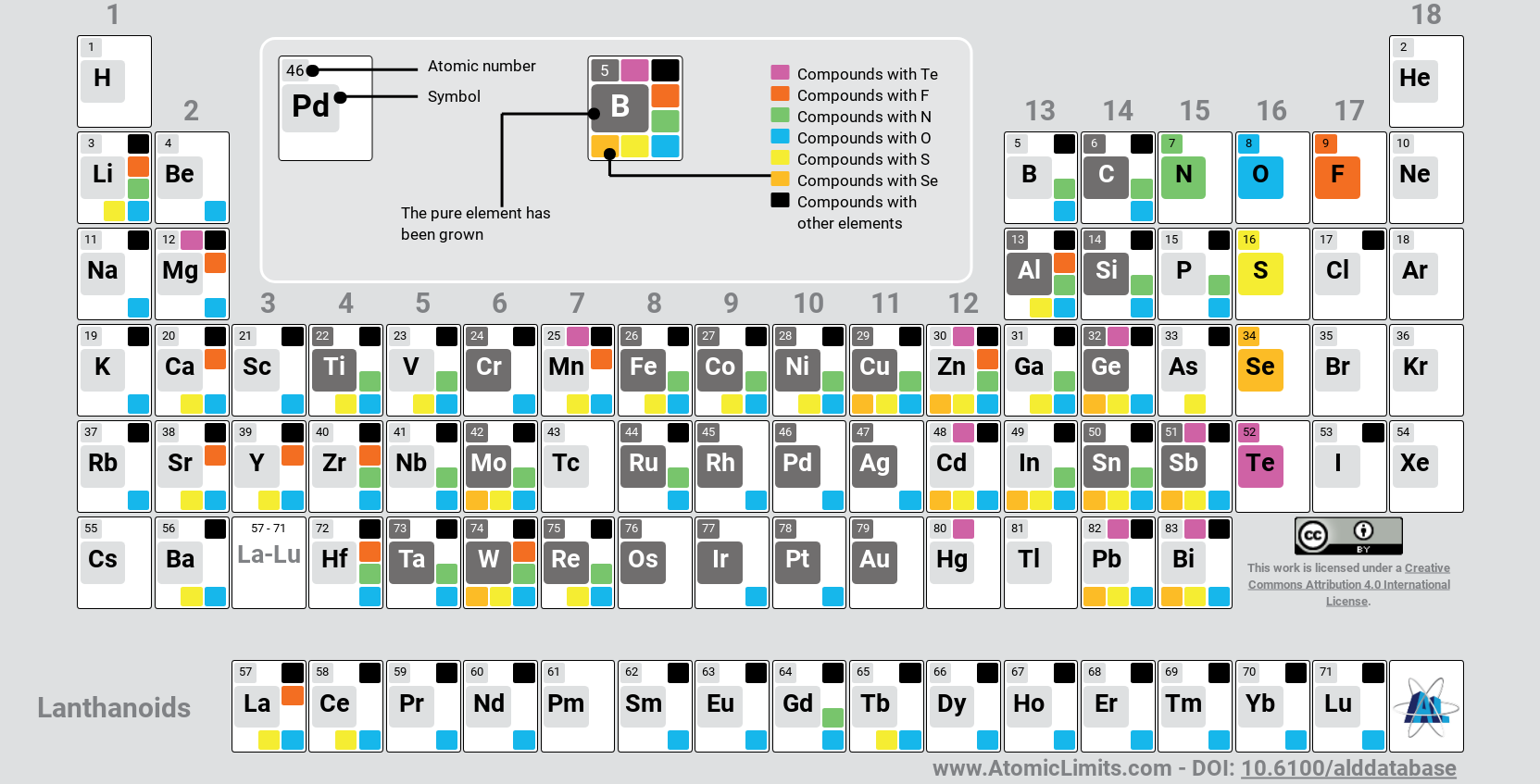
An overview of the materials synthesized by ALD with 1 or more publications describing the process

ALD is a deposition method with great potential for producing very thin, conformal films with control of the thickness and composition of the films possible at the atomic level. A major driving force for the recent interest is the prospective seen for ALD in scaling down microelectronic devices according to Moore's law. ALD is an active field of research, with hundreds of different processes published in the scientific literature, though some of them exhibit behaviors that depart from that of an ideal ALD process. Currently there are several comprehensive review papers that give a summary of the published ALD processes, including the work of Puurunen, Miikkulainen et al., Knoops et al., and Mackus & Schneider et al.. An interactive, community driven database of ALD processes is also available online which generates an up-to-date overview in the form of an annotated periodic table.

The sister technique of atomic layer deposition, molecular layer deposition (MLD), uses organic precursors to deposit polymers. By combining the ALD/MLD techniques, it is possible to make highly conformal and pure hybrid films for many applications.

Another technology related to ALD is sequential infiltration synthesis (SIS) which uses alternating precursor vapor exposures to infiltrate and modify polymers. SIS is also referred to as vapor phase infiltration (VPI) and sequential vapor infiltration (SVI).

== History ==
=== 1960s ===
In the 1960s, Stanislav Koltsov together with Valentin Aleskovsky and colleagues experimentally developed the principles of ALD at Leningrad Technological Institute (LTI) in the Soviet Union. The purpose was to experimentally build upon the theoretical considerations of the "framework hypothesis" coined by Aleskovsky in his 1952 habilitation thesis. The experiments started with metal chloride reactions and water with porous silica, soon extending to other substrate materials and planar thin films. Aleskovskii and Koltsov together proposed the name "Molecular Layering" for the new technique in 1965. The principles of Molecular Layering were summarized in the doctoral thesis ("professor's thesis") of Koltsov in 1971. Research activities of molecular layering covered a broad scope, from fundamental chemistry research to applied research with porous catalysts, sorbents and fillers to microelectronics and beyond.

In 1974, when starting the development of thin-film electroluminescent displays (TFEL) at Instrumentarium Oy in Finland, Tuomo Suntola devised ALD as an advanced thin-film technology. Suntola named it atomic layer epitaxy (ALE) based on the meaning of "epitaxy" in Greek language, "arrangement upon". The first experiments were made with elemental Zn and S to grow ZnS. ALE as a means for growth of thin films was internationally patented in more than 20 countries. A breakthrough occurred, when Suntola and co-workers switched from high vacuum reactors to inert gas reactors which enabled the use of compound reactants like metal chlorides, hydrogen sulfide and water vapor for performing the ALE process. The technology was first disclosed in 1980 SID conference. The TFEL display prototype presented consisted of a ZnS layer between two aluminum oxide dielectric layers, all made in an ALE process using ZnCl_{2} + H_{2}S and AlCl_{3} + H_{2}O as the reactants. The first large-scale proof-of-concept of ALE-EL displays were the flight information boards installed in the Helsinki-Vantaa airport in 1983. TFEL flat panel display production started in the mid-1980s by Lohja Oy in the Olarinluoma factory. Academic research on ALE started in Tampere University of Technology (where Suntola gave lectures on electron physics) in 1970s, and in 1980s at Helsinki University of Technology. TFEL display manufacturing remained until the 1990s the only industrial application of ALE. In 1987, Suntola started the development of the ALE technology for new applications like photovoltaic devices and heterogeneous catalysts in Microchemistry Ltd., established for that purpose by the Finnish national oil company Neste Oy. In the 1990s, ALE development in Microchemistry was directed to semiconductor applications and ALE reactors suitable for silicon wafer processing. In 1999, Microchemistry Ltd. and the ALD technology were sold to the Dutch ASM International, a major supplier of semiconductor manufacturing equipment and Microchemistry Ltd. became ASM Microchemistry Oy as ASM's Finnish daughter company. Microchemistry Ltd/ASM Microchemistry Ltd was the only manufacturer of commercial ALD-reactors in the 1990s. In the early 2000s, the expertise on ALD reactors in Finland triggered two new manufacturers, Beneq Oy and Picosun Oy, the latter started by Sven Lindfors, Suntola's close coworker since 1975. The number of reactor manufacturers increased rapidly and semiconductor applications became the industrial breakthrough of the ALD technology, as ALD became an enabling technology for the continuation of Moore's law. In 2004, Tuomo Suntola received the European SEMI award for the development of the ALD technology for semiconductor applications and in 2018 the Millennium Technology Prize.

The developers of ML and ALE met at the 1st international conference on atomic layer epitaxy, "ALE-1" in Espoo, Finland, 1990. An attempt to expose the extent of molecular layering works was made in a scientific ALD review article in 2005 and later in the VPHA-related publications.

The name "atomic layer deposition" was apparently proposed for the first time in writing as an alternative to ALE in analogy with CVD by Markku Leskelä (professor at the University of Helsinki) at the ALE-1 conference, Espoo, Finland. It took about a decade before the name gained general acceptance with the onset of the international conference series on ALD by American Vacuum Society.

=== 2000s ===
In 2000, Gurtej Singh Sandhu and Trung T. Doan of Micron Technology initiated the development of atomic layer deposition high-κ films for DRAM memory devices. This helped drive cost-effective implementation of semiconductor memory, starting with 90-nm node DRAM. Intel Corporation has reported using ALD to deposit high-κ gate dielectric for its 45 nm CMOS technology.

ALD has been developed in two independent discoveries under names atomic layer epitaxy (ALE, Finland) and molecular layering (ML, Soviet Union). To clarify the early history, the Virtual Project on the History of ALD (VPHA) has been set up in summer 2013. It resulted in several publications reviewing the historical development of ALD under the names ALE and ML.

In 2009, multiple pulsed infiltration (MPI), later referred to as vapor phase infiltation (VPI), sequential vapor infiltration (SVI) or sequential infiltration synthesis (SIS), was first reported by researchers at the Max-Planck Institute of Microstructure Physics and added to the family of ALD-derived techniques.

== Surface reaction mechanisms ==
In a prototypical ALD process, a substrate is exposed to two reactants A and B in a sequential, non-overlapping way. In contrast to other techniques such as chemical vapor deposition (CVD), where thin-film growth proceeds on a steady-state fashion, in ALD each reactant reacts with the surface in a self-limited way: the reactant molecules can react only with a finite number of reactive sites on the surface. Once all those sites have been consumed in the reactor, the growth stops. The remaining reactant molecules are flushed away and only then reactant B is inserted into the reactor. By alternating exposures of A and B, a thin film is deposited. This process is shown in the side figure. Consequently, when describing an ALD process one refers to both dose times (the time a surface is being exposed to a precursor) and purge times (the time left in between doses for the precursor to evacuate the chamber) for each precursor. The dose-purge-dose-purge sequence of a binary ALD process constitutes an ALD cycle. Also, rather than using the concept of growth rate, ALD processes are described in terms of their growth per cycle.

In ALD, enough time must be allowed in each reaction step so that a full adsorption density can be achieved. When this happens the process has reached saturation. This time will depend on two key factors: the precursor pressure, and the sticking probability. Therefore, the rate of adsorption per unit of surface area can be expressed as:

$${R_{abs}} = S*F$$

Where R is the rate of adsorption, S is the sticking probability, and F is the incident molar flux. However, a key characteristic of ALD is the S will change with time, as more molecules have reacted with the surface this sticking probability will become smaller until reaching a value of zero once saturation is reached.

The specific details on the reaction mechanisms are strongly dependent on the particular ALD process. With hundreds of process available to deposit oxide, metals, nitrides, sulfides, chalcogenides, and fluoride materials, the unraveling of the mechanistic aspects of ALD processes is an active field of research. Some representative examples are shown below.

=== Thermal ALD ===
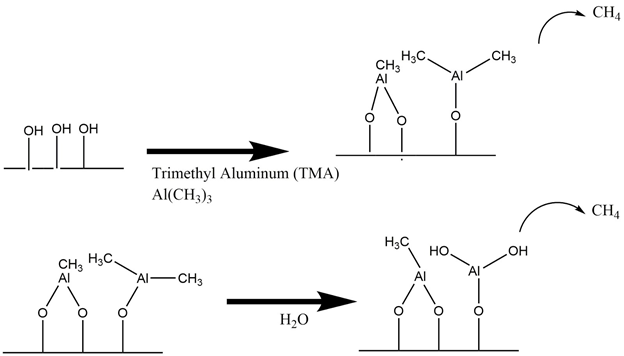
Proposed mechanism for Al_{2}O_{3} ALD during the a) TMA reaction b) H_{2}O reaction

Thermal ALD requires temperatures ranging from room temperature (~20°C) to 350°C for ligand exchange or combustion type surface reactions. It occurs through surface reactions, which enables accurate thickness control no matter the substrate geometry (subject to aspect ratio) and reactor design.

The synthesis of Al_{2}O_{3} from trimethylaluminum (TMA) and water is one of the best known thermal ALD examples. During the TMA exposure, TMA dissociatively chemisorbs on the substrate surface and any remaining TMA is pumped out of the chamber. The dissociative chemisorption of TMA leaves a surface covered with AlCH_{3}. The surface is then exposed to H_{2}O vapor, which reacts with the surface –CH_{3} forming CH_{4} as a reaction byproduct and resulting in a hydroxylated Al_{2}O_{3} surface.

=== Plasma ALD ===
In plasma-assisted ALD (PA-ALD), the high reactivity of the plasma species allows to reduce the deposition temperature without compromising the film quality; also, a wider range of precursors can be used and thus a wider range of materials can be deposited as compared to thermal ALD. PA-ALD can also deliver higher thickness control as well as uniformity in deposition.

=== Spatial ALD ===
In temporal ALD the separate precursor and co-reactant doses are separated from each other in time by a purge step. In contrast, in spatial ALD (s-ALD), these gases are delivered at different locations, so they are separated in space. In atmospheric pressure s-ALD the precursor and co-reactant are delivered continuously and they are separated from each other by a gas curtain to prevent gas phase reactions. Such gas curtain typically consists of nitrogen injection and exhaust positions, see Figure 1. As a substrates moves through the different gas zones, self-limiting reactions take place at the substrate surface and the ALD process takes place. As this process can easily be accelerated, the deposition rate for spatial ALD can be much higher than for conventional ALD. For example, for ALD of Al_{2}O_{3} the deposition rate increases from 100-300 nm per hour to 60 nm per minute.

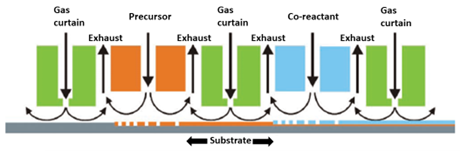
Schematic drawing of the spatial ALD concept

The inline nature of spatial ALD makes it suitable for high volume production lines and roll-to-roll production. In general, s-ALD has been employed to apply moisture permeation barriers, passivation layers in silicon solar cells and functional layers in batteries. The chemistry for spatial ALD processes is comparable with typical temporal ALD processes, and materials that have been explored include inorganic metal oxides such as Al_{2}O_{3}, (Al- or Ga doped) ZnO, SiO_{2}, In_{2}O_{3}, InZnO, LIPON, Zn(O,S), SnO_{x}, and TiO_{x} ,but also PMG metals (Pt, Ir, Ru) can be deposited. Additionally, organic molecules can be grown in combination with inorganic atoms to enable molecular layer deposition (MLD). Plasma- or ozon enhanced spatial ALD has been demonstrated which generally lowers the deposition temperatures required.

=== Photo-assisted ALD ===
In this ALD variety, UV light is used to accelerate surface reactions on the substrate. Hence reaction temperature can be reduced, as in plasma-assisted ALD. As compared to plasma-assisted ALD, the activation is weaker, but is often easier to control by adjusting the wavelength, intensity and timing of illumination.

=== Metal ALD ===
Copper metal ALD has attracted much attention due to the demand for copper as an interconnect material and the relative ease by which copper can be deposited thermally. Copper has a positive standard electrochemical potential and is the most easily reduced metal of the first-row transition metals. Thus, numerous ALD processes have been developed, including several using hydrogen gas as the coreactant. Ideally, copper metal ALD should be performed at ≤100 °C to achieve continuous films with low surface roughness, since higher temperatures can result in agglomeration of deposited copper.

Some metals can be grown by ALD via fluorosilane elimination reactions using a metal halide and a silicon precursor (e.g. SiH_{4}, Si_{2}H_{6}) as the reactants. These reactions are very exothermic due to the formation of stable Si–F bonds. Metals deposited by fluorosilane elimination include tungsten and molybdenum. As an example, the surface reactions for tungsten metal ALD using WF_{6} and Si_{2}H_{6} as the reactants can be expressed as

WSiF_{2}H* + WF_{6} → WWF_{5}* + SiF_{3}H
WF_{5}* + Si_{2}H_{6} → WSiF_{2}H* + SiF_{3}H + 2 H_{2}

The overall ALD reaction is

WF_{6} + Si_{2}H_{6} → W + SiF_{3}H + 2 H_{2}, ∆H = –181 kcal

The growth rate can vary from 4 to 7 Å/cycle depending on the deposition temperature (177 to 325 °C) and Si_{2}H_{6} reactant exposure (~10^{4} to 10^{6} L), factors that may influence Si_{2}H_{6} insertion into Si–H bonds and result in a silicon CVD contribution to the tungsten ALD growth.

The thermal ALD of many other metals is challenging (or presently impossible) due to their very negative electrochemical potentials. Recently, the application of novel strong reducing agents has led to the first reports of low-temperature thermal ALD processes for several electropositive metals. Chromium metal was deposited using a chromium alkoxide precursor and BH_{3}(NHMe_{2}). Titanium and tin metals were grown from their respective metal chlorides (MCl_{4}, M = Ti, Sn) and a bis(trimethylsilyl) six-membered ring compound. Aluminum metal was deposited using an aluminum dihydride precursor and AlCl_{3}.

=== Catalytic SiO_{2} ALD ===
The use of catalysts is of paramount importance in delivering reliable methods of SiO_{2} ALD. Without catalysts, surface reactions leading to the formation of SiO_{2} are generally very slow and only occur at exceptionally high temperatures. Typical catalysts for SiO_{2} ALD include Lewis bases such as NH_{3} or pyridine and SiO_{2}; ALD can also be initiated when these Lewis bases are coupled with other silicon precursors such as tetraethoxysilane (TEOS). Hydrogen bonding is believed to occur between the Lewis base and the SiOH* surface species or between the H_{2}O based reactant and the Lewis base. Oxygen becomes a stronger nucleophile when the Lewis base hydrogen bonds with the SiOH* surface species because the SiO-H bond is effectively weakened. As such, the electropositive Si atom in the SiCl_{4} reactant is more susceptible to nucleophilic attack. Similarly, hydrogen bonding between a Lewis base and an H_{2}O reactant make the electronegative O in H_{2}O a strong nucleophile that is able to attack the Si in an existing SiCl* surface species. The use of a Lewis base catalyst is more or less a requirement for SiO_{2} ALD, as without a Lewis base catalyst, reaction temperatures must exceed 325 °C and pressures must exceed 10^{3} torr. Generally, the most favorable temperature to perform SiO_{2} ALD is at 32 °C and a common deposition rate is 1.35 angstroms per binary reaction sequence. Two surface reactions for SiO_{2} ALD, an overall reaction, and a schematic illustrating Lewis base catalysis in SiO_{2} ALD are provided below.

Primary reactions at surface:

SiOH* + SiCl_{4} → SiOSiCl_{3}* + HCl
SiCl* + H_{2}O → SiOH* + HCl

Overall ALD reaction:

SiCl_{4} + 2H_{2}O → SiO_{2} + 4 HCl

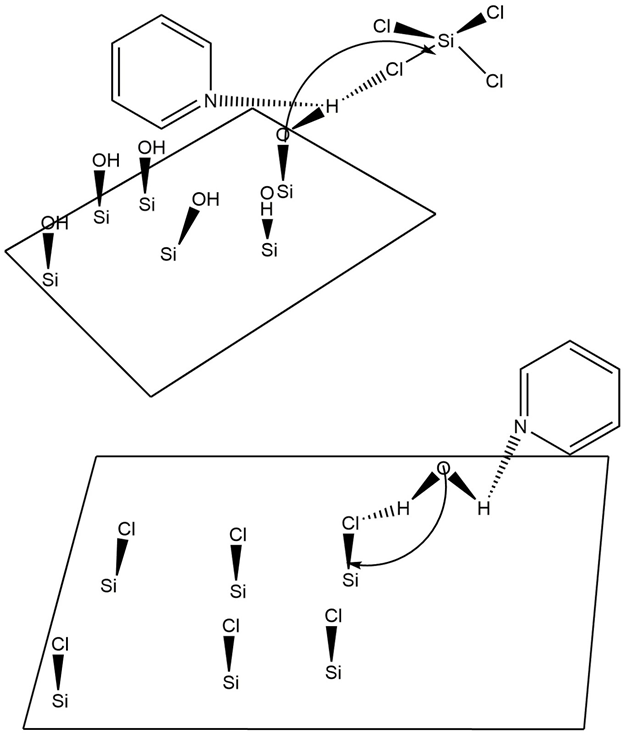
Proposed mechanism of Lewis base catalysis of SiO_{2} ALD during a) an SiCl_{4} reaction and b) an H_{2}O reaction

ALD reaction mechanisms
Type of ALD	Temperature range	Viable substrates	Reactants	Applications
Catalytic ALD	>32 °C with Lewis base catalyst	Metal oxides (i.e. TiO_{2}, ZrO_{2},SnO_{2})	(Metal)Cl_{4}, H_{2}O	High k-dielectric layers, protective layers, anti-reflective layers, etc.
Al_{2}O_{3} ALD	30–300 °C	Al_{2}O_{3}, metal oxides	(Metal)Cl_{4}, H_{2}O, Ti(OiPr)_{4}, (Metal)(Et)_{2}	Dielectric layers, insulating layers, etc., Solar Cell surface passivations
Metal ALD using thermal chemistry	175–400 °C	Metal Fluorides, organometallics, catalytic metals	M(C_{5}H_{5})_{2}, (CH_{3}C_{5}H_{4})M(CH_{3})_{3} ,Cu(thd)_{2}, Pd(hfac)_{2}, Ni(acac)_{2}, H_{2}	Conductive pathways, catalytic surfaces, MOS devices
ALD on polymers	25–100 °C	Common polymers (polyethylene, PMMA, PP, PS, PVC, PVA, etc.)	Al(CH_{3})_{3}, H_{2}O, M(CH_{3})_{3}	Polymer surface functionalization, creation of composites, diffusion barriers, etc.
ALD on particles	25–100 °C for polymer particles, 100–400 °C for metal/alloy particles	BN, ZrO_{2}, CNTs, polymer particles	Various gases: Fluidized bed reactors are used to allow coating of individual particles	Deposition of protective and insulative coatings, optical and mechanical property modification, formation of composite structures, conductive mediums
Plasma or radical-enhanced ALD for single element ALD materials	20–800 °C	Pure metals (i.e. Ta, Ti, Si, Ge, Ru, Pt), metal nitrides (i.e. TiN, TaN, etc.)	Organometallics, MH_{2}Cl_{2}, tertbutylimidotris(diethylamido)tantalum (TBTDET), bis(ethylcyclopentadienyl)ruthenium), NH_{3}	DRAM structures, MOSFET and semiconductor devices, capacitors
Plasma-enhanced ALD of metal oxides and nitrides	20–300 °C	Al_{2}O_{3}, SiO_{2}, ZnO_{x}, InO_{x}, HfO_{2}, SiN_{x}, TaN_{x}	Similar to thermal ALD	

== Applications ==
=== Microelectronics applications ===
ALD is a useful process for the fabrication of microelectronics due to its ability to produce accurate thicknesses and uniform surfaces in addition to high quality film production using various different materials. In microelectronics, ALD is studied as a potential technique to deposit high-κ (high permittivity) gate oxides, high-κ memory capacitor dielectrics, ferroelectrics, and metals and nitrides for electrodes and interconnects. In high-κ gate oxides, where the control of ultra thin films is essential, ALD is only likely to come into wider use at the 45 nm technology. In metallizations, conformal films are required; currently it is expected that ALD will be used in mainstream production at the 65 nm node. In dynamic random access memories (DRAMs), the conformality requirements are even higher and ALD is the only method that can be used when feature sizes become smaller than 100 nm. Several products that use ALD include magnetic recording heads, MOSFET gate stacks, DRAM capacitors, nonvolatile ferroelectric memories, and many others.

==== Gate oxides ====
Deposition of the high-κ oxides Al_{2}O_{3}, ZrO_{2}, and HfO_{2} has been one of the most widely examined areas of ALD. The motivation for high-κ oxides comes from the problem of high tunneling current through the commonly used SiO_{2} gate dielectric in MOSFETs when it is downscaled to a thickness of 1.0 nm and below. With the high-κ oxide, a thicker gate dielectric can be made for the required capacitance density, thus the tunneling current can be reduced through the structure.

==== Transition-metal nitrides ====
Transition-metal nitrides, such as TiN and TaN, find potential use both as metal barriers and as gate metals. Metal barriers are used to encase the copper interconnects used in modern integrated circuits to avoid diffusion of Cu into the surrounding materials, such as insulators and the silicon substrate, and also, to prevent Cu contamination by elements diffusing from the insulators by surrounding every Cu interconnect with a layer of metal barriers. The metal barriers have strict demands: they should be pure; dense; conductive; conformal; thin; have good adhesion towards metals and insulators. The requirements concerning process technique can be fulfilled by ALD. The most studied ALD nitride is TiN which is deposited from TiCl_{4} and NH_{3}.

==== Metal films ====
Motivations of an interest in metal ALD are:

1. Cu interconnects and W plugs, or at least Cu seed layers for Cu electrodeposition and W seeds for W CVD,
2. transition-metal nitrides (e.g. TiN, TaN, WN) for Cu interconnect barriers
3. noble metals for ferroelectric random access memory (FRAM) and DRAM capacitor electrodes
4. high- and low-work function metals for dual-gate MOSFETs.

==== Magnetic recording heads ====
Magnetic recording heads utilize electric fields to polarize particles and leave a magnetized pattern on a hard disk. Al_{2}O_{3} ALD is used to create uniform, thin layers of insulation. By using ALD, it is possible to control the insulation thickness to a high level of accuracy. This allows for more accurate patterns of magnetized particles and thus higher quality recordings.

==== DRAM capacitors ====
DRAM capacitors are yet another application of ALD. An individual DRAM cell can store a single bit of data and consists of a single MOS transistor and a capacitor. Major efforts are being put into reducing the size of the capacitor which will effectively allow for greater memory density. In order to change the capacitor size without affecting the capacitance, different cell orientations are being used. Some of these include stacked or trench capacitors. With the emergence of trench capacitors, the problem of fabricating these capacitors comes into play, especially as the size of semiconductors decreases. ALD allows trench features to be scaled to beyond 100 nm. The ability to deposit single layers of material allows for a great deal of control over the material. Except for some issues of incomplete film growth (largely due to insufficient amount or low temperature substrates), ALD provides an effective means of depositing thin films like dielectrics or barriers.

=== Photovoltaic Applications ===
The use of ALD technique in solar cells is becoming more prominent with time. In the past, it has been used to deposit surface passivation layers in crystalline-silicon (c-Si) solar cells, buffer layers in copper indium gallium selenide (CIGS) solar cells and barrier layers in dye-sensitized solar cells (DSSCs). For e.g., the use of ALD grown Al_{2}O_{3} for solar cell applications was demonstrated by Schmidt et al. It was used as a surface passivation layer for the development of PERC (passivated emitter and rear cell) solar cells. The use of ALD technique to deposit charge transport layers (CTLs) is also being explored widely for perovskite solar cells. The ability of ALD to deposit high quality and conformal films with precise control on thickness can provide great advantage in finely tailoring the interfaces between CTL and perovskite layer. Moreover, it can be useful in obtaining uniform and pin-hole free films over large areas. These aspects make ALD a promising technique in further improving and stabilizing the performance of perovskite solar cells.

=== Electro-optic Applications ===
==== Thin Film Couplers ====
As photonic integrated circuits (PICs) emerge, often in a manner similar to electronic integrated circuits, a wide variety of on-chip optical device structures are needed. One example is the nanophotonic coupler that behaves as a micrometer-size beamsplitter at the intersection of optical waveguides in which high aspect ratio trenches (~100 nm width x 4 micrometer depth) are first defined by etching then back-filled with aluminum oxide by ALD to form optical-quality interfaces.

=== Biomedical applications ===
Understanding and being able to specify the surface properties on biomedical devices is critical in the biomedical industry, especially regarding devices that are implanted in the body. A material interacts with the environment at its surface, so the surface properties largely direct the interactions of the material with its environment. Surface chemistry and surface topography affect protein adsorption, cellular interactions, and the immune response.

Some current uses in biomedical applications include creating flexible sensors, modifying nanoporous membranes, polymer ALD, and creating thin biocompatible coatings. ALD has been used to deposit TiO_{2} films to create optical waveguide sensors as diagnostic tools. Also, ALD is beneficial in creating flexible sensing devices that can be used, for example, in the clothing of athletes to detect movement or heart rate. ALD is one possible manufacturing process for flexible organic field-effect transistors (OFETs) because it is a low-temperature deposition method.

Nanoporous materials are emerging throughout the biomedical industry in drug delivery, implants, and tissue engineering. The benefit of using ALD to modify the surfaces of nanoporous materials is that, unlike many other methods, the saturation and self-limiting nature of the reactions means that even deeply embedded surfaces and interfaces are coated with a uniform film. Nanoporous surfaces can have their pore size reduced further in the ALD process because the conformal coating will completely coat the insides of the pores. This reduction in pore size may be advantageous in certain applications.

=== As a permeation barrier for plastics ===
ALD can be used as a permeation barrier for plastics. For example, it is well established as a method for encapsulation of OLEDs on plastic. ALD can also be used to inoculate 3-D printed plastic parts for use in vacuum environments by mitigating outgassing, which allows for custom low-cost tools for both semiconductor processing and space applications. ALD can be used to form a barrier on plastics in roll to roll processes.

=== Quality and its control ===
The quality of an ALD process can be monitored using several different imaging techniques to make sure that the ALD process is occurring smoothly and producing a conformal layer over a surface. One option is the use of cross-sectional scanning electron microscopy (SEM) or transmission electron microscopy (TEM). High magnification of images is pertinent for assessing the quality of an ALD layer. X-ray reflectivity (XRR) is a technique that measures thin-film properties including thickness, density, and surface roughness. Another optical quality evaluation tool is spectroscopic ellipsometry. Its application between the depositions of each layer by ALD provides information on the growth rate and material characteristics of the film.

Applying this analysis tool during the ALD process, sometimes referred to as in situ spectroscopic ellipsometry, allows for greater control over the growth rate of the films during the ALD process. This type of quality control occurs during the ALD process rather than assessing the films afterwards as in TEM imaging, or XRR. Additionally, Rutherford backscattering spectroscopy (RBS), X-ray photoelectron spectroscopy (XPS), Auger electron spectroscopy (AES), and four-terminal sensing can be used to provide quality control information with regards to thin films deposited by ALD.

== Advantages and limitations ==
=== Advantages ===
ALD provides a very controlled method to produce a film to an atomically specified thickness. Also, the growth of different multilayer structures is straightforward. Because of the sensitivity and precision of the equipment, it is very beneficial to those in the field of microelectronics and nanotechnology in producing small, but efficient semiconductors. ALD typically involves the use of relatively low temperatures and a catalyst, which is thermochemically favored. The lower temperature is beneficial when working with soft substrates, such as organic and biological samples. Some precursors that are thermally unstable still may be used so long as their decomposition rate is relatively slow.

=== Disadvantages ===
High purity of the substrates is very important, and as such, high costs will ensue. Although this cost may not be much relative to the cost of the equipment needed, one may need to run several trials before finding conditions that favor their desired product. Once the layer has been made and the process is complete, there may be a requirement of needing to remove excess precursors from the final product. In some final products there are less than 1% of impurities present.

==== Economic viability ====
Atomic layer deposition instruments can range anywhere from $200,000 to $800,000 based on the quality and efficiency of the instrument. There is no set cost for running a cycle of these instruments; the cost varies depending on the quality and purity of the substrates used, as well as the temperature and time of machine operation. Some substrates are less available than others and require special conditions, as some are very sensitive to oxygen and may then increase the rate of decomposition. Multicomponent oxides and certain metals traditionally needed in the microelectronics industry are generally not cost efficient.

==== Reaction time ====
The process of ALD is very slow and this is known to be its major limitation. For example, Al_{2}O_{3} is deposited at a rate of 0.11 nm per cycle, which can correspond to an average deposition rate of 100–300 nm per hour, depending on cycle duration and pumping speed. This problem can be overrun by using Spatial ALD, where the substrate is moved in space below a special ALD showerhead, and both the precursor gasses are separated by gas curtains/bearings. In this way, deposition rates of 60 nm per minute could be reached. ALD is typically used to produce substrates for microelectronics and nanotechnology, and therefore, thick atomic layers are not needed. Many substrates cannot be used because of their fragility or impurity. Impurities are typically found on the 0.1–1 at.% because of some of the carrier gases are known to leave residue and are also sensitive to oxygen.

==== Chemical limitations ====
Precursors must be volatile, but not subject to decomposition, as most precursors are very sensitive to oxygen/air, thus causing a limitation on the substrates that may be used. Some biological substrates are very sensitive to heat and may have fast decomposition rates that are not favored and yield larger impurity levels. There are a multitude of thin-film substrate materials available, but the important substrates needed for use in microelectronics can be hard to obtain and may be very expensive.

== See also ==
- Atomic layer etching
- Single layer etching
