= Atomic layer epitaxy =

Atomic layer epitaxy (ALE), more generally known as atomic layer deposition (ALD), is a specialized form of thin film growth (epitaxy) that typically deposit alternating monolayers of two elements onto a substrate. The crystal lattice structure achieved is thin, uniform, and aligned with the structure of the substrate. The reactants are brought to the substrate as alternating pulses with "dead" times in between. ALE makes use of the fact that the incoming material is bound strongly until all sites available for chemisorption are occupied. The dead times are used to flush the excess material. It is mostly used in semiconductor fabrication to grow thin films of thickness in the nanometer scale.

== Technique ==
This technique was invented in 1974 and patented the same year (patent published in 1976) by Dr. Tuomo Suntola at the Instrumentarium company, Finland. Dr. Suntola's purpose was to grow thin films of Zinc sulfide to fabricate electroluminescent flat panel displays. The main trick used for this technique is the use of a self-limiting chemical reaction to control in an accurate way the thickness of the film deposited. Since the early days, ALE (ALD) has grown to a global thin film technology which has enabled the continuation of Moore's law. In 2018, Suntola received the Millennium Technology Prize for ALE (ALD) technology.

Compared to basic chemical vapour deposition, in ALE (ALD), chemical reactants are pulsed alternatively in a reaction chamber and then chemisorb in a saturating manner on the surface of the substrate, forming a chemisorbed monolayer.

ALD introduces two complementary precursors (e.g. Al(CH_{3})_{3} and H_{2}O) alternatively into the reaction chamber. Typically, one of the precursors will adsorb onto the substrate surface until it saturates the surface and further growth cannot occur until the second precursor is introduced. Thus the film thickness is controlled by the number of precursor cycles rather than the deposition time as is the case for conventional CVD processes. ALD allows for extremely precise control of film thickness and uniformity.

== See also ==
- Atomic layer etching
- Single layer etching
- Atomic layer deposition
