= Arthur J. Collingsworth =

American diplomat (1944–2013)

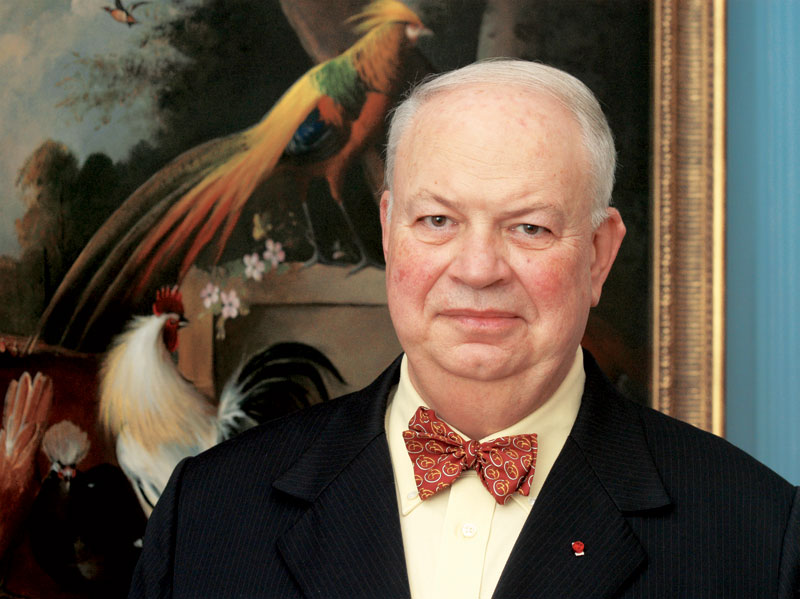
- Born: February 28, 1944; Jackson, Michigan, United States
- Died: July 23, 2013 (aged 69); Berlin, Germany
- Resting place: San Diego, California, United States
- Awards: Order of the White Rose from the Government of Finland, Order of the Lion from the Government of Finland

Arthur J. Collingsworth (February 28, 1944 – July 23, 2013) was an American United Nations official, international student exchange executive, consultant on international fund raising and real estate investor. He lived in the United States, Japan, United Kingdom, Czech Republic and Germany.

== Life ==
Collingsworth was born on February 28, 1944, in Jackson, Michigan. He grew up and attended public schools in Tecumseh, Michigan, where he was a student leader.

At the age of fourteen he wrote a letter to President Juscelino Kubitschek of Brazil that resulted in his appointment as Brazilian Government Trade Bureau Representative to Michigan and Ohio. The media described him as the "world's youngest diplomat" and the United States Information Agency made a film about him called A Midwestern Boy Writes to the President of Brazil. In recognition of his promotional efforts President Kubitschek invited him to visit Brazil for a month in 1960.

In 1962 he entered the University of Michigan as a Regents Alumni Scholarship recipient and received a B.A. in political science in 1967. He was active in a number of organizations and took a year to serve on the staff of his local congressman. He also spent a summer doing research work for the Foreign Affairs Research Division of the House Republican Conference in Washington, D.C., and wrote a syndicated column entitled "Our Man in Washington" for a group of Michigan newspapers.

In the summer of 1965 he spent several months in South Vietnam as a student leader observer on a grant from an American organization. In the summer of 1966 he made his second trip around the world as chairman of a delegation of national college Republican leaders. The group met with a number of senior political and government leaders and prepared a report for selected Republican members of the House Foreign Affairs Committee upon their return. In 1967 Collingsworth established the Niels Hansen Memorial Foundation and has served as its chairman since then.

In the autumn of 1967 he entered the Georgetown University Graduate School. He held an Earhart Foundation Fellowship and served as a Fellow at the Center for Strategic and International Studies (CSIS). He received his M.A. in government (international relations) in 1971. While a Fellow at CSIS he helped to author Trading with Communist Countries: A Reference Manual, which was published by the Center in January 1968. He work for a year on the Presidential campaign staff of Richard Nixon and sthen served on the White House Transition staff.

Collingsworth was named Director of Public Affairs and Development of the YFU Teenage Student Exchange Program of Ann Arbor, Michigan, in 1969. YFU was one of the world's two largest student exchange organizations. In 1975 he was named vice president and held this position until August 1982. During his tenure he raised more than $20 million for the organization and pioneered fund raising in Japan where he generated more than $10 million from government and private sources. He conceived and funded the Japan–U.S. Senate Student Exchange Program that was followed by the Bundestag–Congress Student Exchange Program with Germany and the Finland–U.S. Senate Student Exchange Program. He subsequently served as a Trustee and Consultant to YFU for another twelve years.

In September 1982, Collingsworth joined the staff of the United Nations University (UNU) in Tokyo as their Senior Resource Development Officer. The UNU is a United Nations agency with a mandate for research, training and dissemination of information on areas of interest to the UN. He raised $30 million plus the provision of physical facilities from the Government of Finland for the establishment of the UNU's first research and training center, the World Institute for Development Economics Research (WIDER) in Helsinki, Finland. In April 1985 he was named Director of the United Nations University Office in Europe located and held this post in London until late 1988.

In December 1984, the President of Finland conferred the Order of the White Rose, Knight 1st Class, on Collingsworth. He was the youngest non-Finn to have received this honor. He is also a Commander of the Most Venerable Order of the Hospital of St. John of Jerusalem, a member of Grace Episcopal Cathedral in San Francisco and of the Metropolitan Club of Washington, DC.

In 1989 he began a consultancy specializing in international fund raising. His clients included The Royal Institute of International Affairs (Chatham House) in London, WIDER in Helsinki, Oxford University (Refugee Studies Center), the W.K. Kellogg Foundation, where he assisted in the initiation of their $65 million grant that established the International Youth Foundation, and the Center for Strategic and International Studies.

During the 1990s, Collingsworth and Brian R. Simmons, his British life partner of 38 years, divided their time between their homes in San Francisco and Craignish Castle on the west coast of Scotland. Aside from consulting they acquired, upgraded, and managed apartment projects in San Francisco. Collingsworth also served on the Boards of the World Affairs Council of Northern California for 10 years, the San Francisco Committee on Foreign Relations, and the American Scandinavian Foundation in New York. He also served as the national treasurer of Log Cabin Republicans for three years.

In 1999 Collingsworth conceived and promoted the initiative known as the Millennium Technology Prize as Finland's legacy for serving as President of the European Union. The Prize of 800,000 to one million Euros is given every other year to someone who has made the greatest contribution to a technology that improves the quality of life and sustainable development. It is the world's largest award in the field of technology. The Prize is presented by the President of Finland. In 2004 the President of Finland conferred the Order of the Lion, Commander class, on Collingsworth making him one of the few foreigners to have received Finland's two highest decorations.

The U.S. President appointed him to a four-year term on the National Security Education Board in 2002. Between 1997 and 2009 Collingsworth lectured on European history aboard more than 25 cruises for the National Trust for Historic Preservation and the Metropolitan Museum of Art. During this period he divided his time among San Francisco, Prague, San Diego, and Berlin starting in 2008.

Collingsworth had a lifelong interest in Imperial Russia. His godfather, Tihon Kulikovsky, was the eldest son of Grand Duchess Olga Alexandrovna and nephew of Czar Nicholas II. He visited Olga various times when she was living in exile in Canada in the 1950s. She was a gifted painter (primarily watercolors but also oils) and Collingsworth assembled one of the largest private collections of her art that has been shown in several exhibitions, including a special exhibition at the residence of the Russian Ambassador in Washington, D.C. In 2006 he accompanied members of the Romanov family to the state reburial of Olga's mother, Empress Maria Feodorovna (Dagmar), in St. Petersburg, Russia. He lectured extensively on the history of the Romanov Family and Imperial Russia.

Collingsworth had an interest in encouraging young people to study abroad. Over the years, Collingsworth and Simmons gave out scholarships to students in many parts of the world. They stayed in touch with many of these people and watched them launch careers in their respective countries.

Simmons and Collingsworth traveled extensively. They lived together in many parts of the US, most recently in the San Diego area, and over the years they maintained homes in Tokyo, London, Scotland, Prague and Berlin.

Arthur J. Collingsworth died in Berlin, Germany on July 23, 2013, from complications of bone marrow cancer.
