= USS Collingsworth =

1944 Haskell-class attack transport

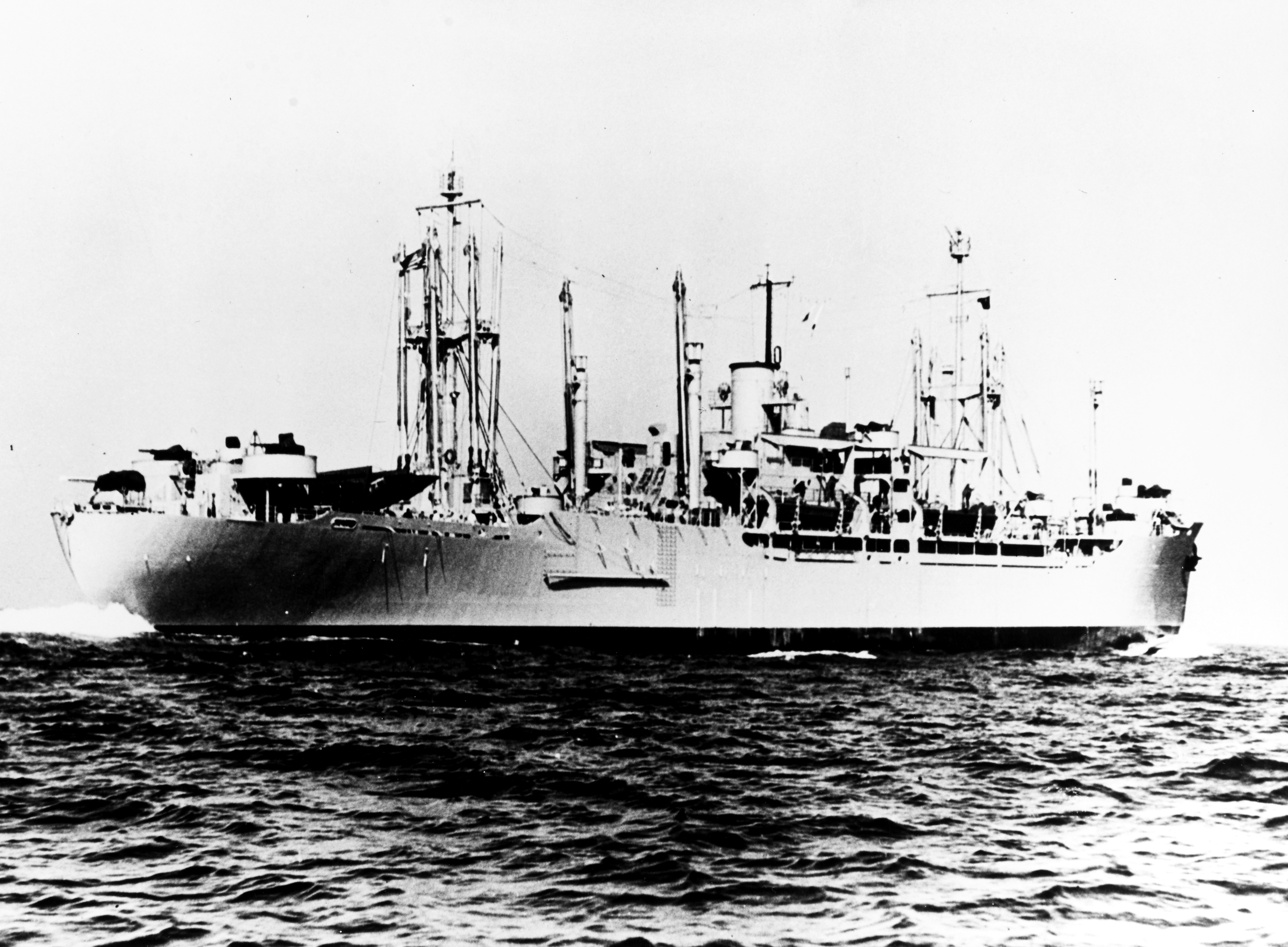

History

United States
- Name: USS Collingsworth
- Namesake: Collingsworth County, Texas
- Builder: California Shipbuilding Corporation
- Laid down: 6 October 1944
- Launched: 2 December 1944
- Completed: 26 February 1945
- Acquired: 27 February 1945
- Commissioned: 27 February 1945
- Decommissioned: 17 March 1946
- Stricken: 28 March 1946
- Fate: Sold for scrap, 15 April 1985

General characteristics
- Class & type: Haskell-class attack transport
- Displacement: 6,873 tons (lt), 14,837 t (fl)
- Length: 455 ft (139 m)
- Beam: 62 ft (19 m)
- Draft: 24 ft (7 m)
- Propulsion: 1 × geared turbine, 2 × header-type boilers, 1 × propeller, designed 8,500 shp (6,338 kW)
- Speed: 17 knots (31 km/h; 20 mph)
- Boats & landing craft carried: 2 × LCM; 12 × LCVP; 3 × LCPL
- Capacity: Troops: 86 officers, 1,475 enlisted; Cargo: 150,000 cu ft, 2,900 tons
- Complement: 56 officers, 480 enlisted
- Armament: 1 × 5"/38 dual-purpose gun; 4 × twin 40mm guns; 10 × single 20mm guns; late armament, add 1 × 40mm quad mount

USS Collingsworth (APA/LPA-146) was a Haskell-class attack transport in service with the United States Navy from 1945 to 1946. She was scrapped in 1985.

== History ==
Collingsworth was launched 2 December 1944 by California Shipbuilding Corp., San Pedro, California, under a Maritime Commission contract; sponsored by Mrs. R. H. Moulton; acquired 27 February 1945 and commissioned the same day. The hull and engine are a standard Victory ship design, she was the 62nd (TR30) Victory ship hull built by CalShip in just 143 days.

After one cargo voyage to Pearl Harbor (8 May-4 June 1945), Collingsworth departed Seattle, Washington, 27 June and sailed by way of Saipan and Ulithi to Okinawa, arriving 12 August. She carried troops for the occupations of Inchon, Korea, and Chinwangtao and Qingdao, China, until 28 November when she sailed with homeward-bound servicemen for Tacoma, Washington, arriving 19 December. She discharged her passengers and sailed for San Pedro, California, the Panama Canal and Norfolk, Virginia, arriving 28 February 1946.

=== Decommissioning and fate ===
She was decommissioned there 17 March 1946 and transferred to the Maritime Commission 20 March 1946. She was laid up in the James River and sold for scrap on 15 April 1985.
