= Tuomo Suntola =

Finnish physicist and inventor

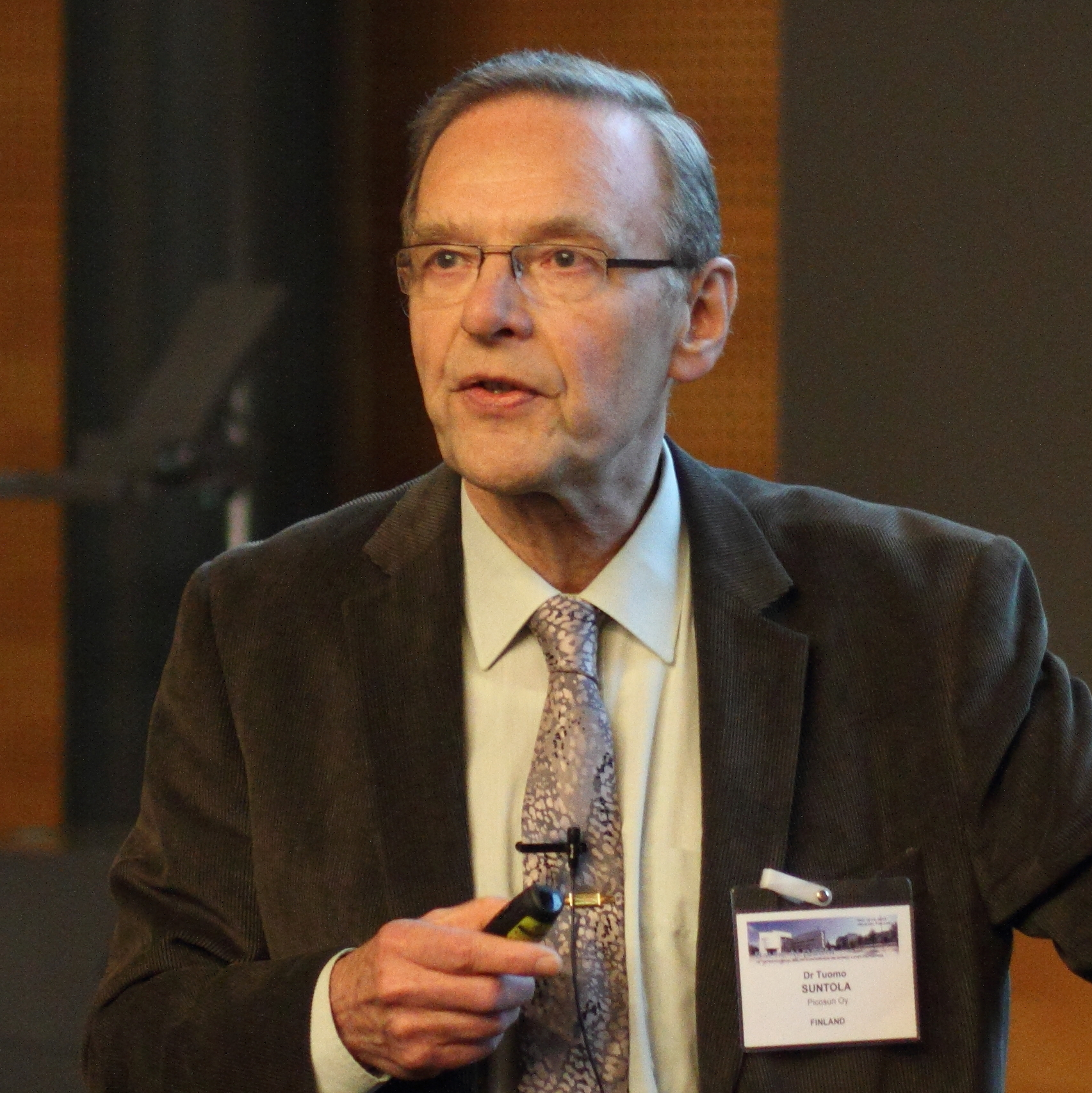
- Suntola in 2014
- Born: 1943 (age 82–83); Tampere, Finland
- Education: Helsinki University of Technology
- Known for: Atomic layer deposition
- Awards: Order of the Lion of Finland - Knight 1st Class, European SEMI Award in 2004, Millennium Technology Prize 2018
- Scientific career
- Fields: Materials science

Tuomo Suntola (born 1943) is a Finnish physicist, inventor, and technology leader. He is best known for his pioneering research in materials science, developing the thin film growth technique called atomic layer deposition.

== Early life ==
Suntola was born in Tampere, Pirkanmaa, in 1943, during the Continuation War. He showed interest in technology early on, building wooden replicas of second world war aircraft. In his teens his interests expanded and he progressed to radios and amplifiers.

== Education and career ==
In 1971, Tuomo Suntola earned his PhD in semiconductor physics from the Helsinki University of Technology. After completing his PhD, Suntola made his first industrial development while working at VTT Technical Research Centre of Finland, a thin film humidity sensor "Humicap" for Vaisala Oy, a Finnish company specialized in meteorological instruments.

In 1974, Suntola started the development of thin film electroluminescent displays in the Finnish company Instrumentarium Oy. He introduced the atomic layer epitaxy (ALE) technology, nowadays known as atomic layer deposition (ALD), as the solution for the manufacturing of the EL-devices which required thin films with very high dielectric strength. The technology was brought into industrial production of EL devices in the mid-1980s by Lohja Corporation in Finland. Atomic Layer Deposition later became one of the key manufacturing techniques in the semiconductor device fabrication.

In 1987, Suntola started Microchemistry Ltd as a subsidiary of the national oil company Neste Oy to apply the ALD technology to new application areas like thin film photovoltaic devices, heterogeneous catalysts, and most importantly, to semiconductor devices. In 1998, Microchemistry Ltd., and the ALD technology, was sold to Dutch ASM International, a major supplier of semiconductor manufacturing equipment; Microchemistry Ltd. became ASM Microchemistry Oy as ASM’s Finnish daughter company. In 1997, preceding the acquisition of Microchemistry Ltd, Suntola started as Research Fellow in the national energy company Fortum Corporation, created via the fusion of Neste Corporation, and the national Electric Utility Company. Suntola’s activity in Fortum was focused to renewable energies and advanced energy technologies. He retired from Fortum in 2004, but continues as a Board Member in Picosun Oy, a Finnish manufacturer of ALD reactors. He has important patents on ALD technology and thin film devices.

== Dynamic universe theory ==
Since the 1990s, Suntola has been working on a theory which he claims to be a replacement for the standard theories of relativity, quantum mechanics and cosmology. The theory has been published in the book The Dynamic Universe – Toward a unified picture of physical reality. In a related book, The Short History of Science, Suntola traces the development of the scientific picture of reality from antique to present day, culminating in the Dynamic Universe theory. Suntola's theory has failed to pass peer review for publication in scientific journals and is considered pseudoscience.

== Awards ==
In 2004, Suntola received the European SEMI Award "Honoring the Pioneer in Atomic Layer Deposition Techniques … that paved the way for the development of nanoscale semiconductor devices".

In 2018, Suntola won the Finnish Millennium Technology Prize for his contribution to the development of information technology on the basis that "The extremely thin isolating or conducting films needed in microprocessors and computer memory devices can only be manufactured using the ALD technology developed by Tuomo Suntola." The 74-year-old was awarded one million euros ($1.18 million). His technology is used to manufacture ultra-thin material layers for a variety of devices such as computers, smartphones, microprocessors and digital memory devices, enabling high performance in small size.

== Notable publications ==
- T. Suntola, "On the Mechanism of Switching Effects in Chalcogenide Thin Films", Solid-State Electronics 1971, Vol. 14, pp. 933–938
- 1972-11-12/1979-08-21, US 4,164,868 Suntola, Capacitive humidity transducer
- 1974-11-29/1977-11-15, US 4,058,430 Suntola, Antson, Method for producing compound thin films
- 1979-02-28/1983-11-01, US 4,413,022 Suntola, Pakkala, Lindfors, Method for performing growth of compound thin films
- 1980-08-20/1983-06-14, US 4,388,554 Suntola, Antson, Electroluminescent display component
- T. Suntola, "Atomic Layer Epitaxy", Tech. Digest of ICVGE-5, San Diego, 1981
- T. Suntola, J. Hyvärinen, "Atomic Layer Epitaxy", Annu. Rev. Mater. Sci. 15 (1985) 177
- 1985-03-05/1990-03-13, US 4,907,862 Suntola, Method for generating electronically controllable color elements and color display based on the method
- T. Suntola, "Atomic Layer Epitaxy", Materials Science Reports, Volume 4, number 7, December 1989, 0920-2307/89, Elsevier Science Publishers B.V.
- 1990-01-16/2003-03-18, US 6,534,431 Suntola et al., Process and apparatus for preparing heterogeneous catalysts
- 1991-07-16/2002-12-31, US 6,500,780 Suntola et al., Method for preparing heterogeneous catalysts of desired metal content
- T.Suntola, "CdTe Thin-Film Solar Cells", MRS Bulletin, Vol. XVIII, No. 10, 1993
- T. Suntola, "Atomic Layer Epitaxy", Handbook of Crystal Growth 3, Thin Films and Epitaxy, Part B: Growth Mechanisms and Dynamics, Chapter 14, Elsevier Science Publishers B.V., 1994.
- S. Haukka, E.-L. Lakomaa, T. Suntola, "Adsorption controlled preparation of heterogeneous catalysts", Adsorption and its Applications in Industry and Environmental Protection, A.Dabrowski, ed, Elsevier Science Publishers B.V.,1998.
- Tuomo Suntola, The Short History of Science - or the long path to the union of metaphysics and empiricism, September 2018 ISBN 978-952-68101-0-2
- R. L. Puurunen, H. Kattelus, T. Suntola, "Atomic layer deposition in MEMS technology", Ch. 26 of Handbook of Silicon Based MEMS Materials and Technologies, Ed. V. Lindroos et al., pp. 433–446, Elsevier, 2010.
- Tuomo Suntola, The Dynamic Universe - Toward a unified picture of physical reality, Fourth edition, September 2018, ISBN 978-1461027034.
