= Millennium Technology Prize =

Finnish technology prize

The Millennium Technology Prize
- Awarded for: Life-enhancing technological innovation
- Country: Finland
- Presented by: Technology Academy Finland
- Reward: €1 million
- First award: 2004
- Website: millenniumprize.org

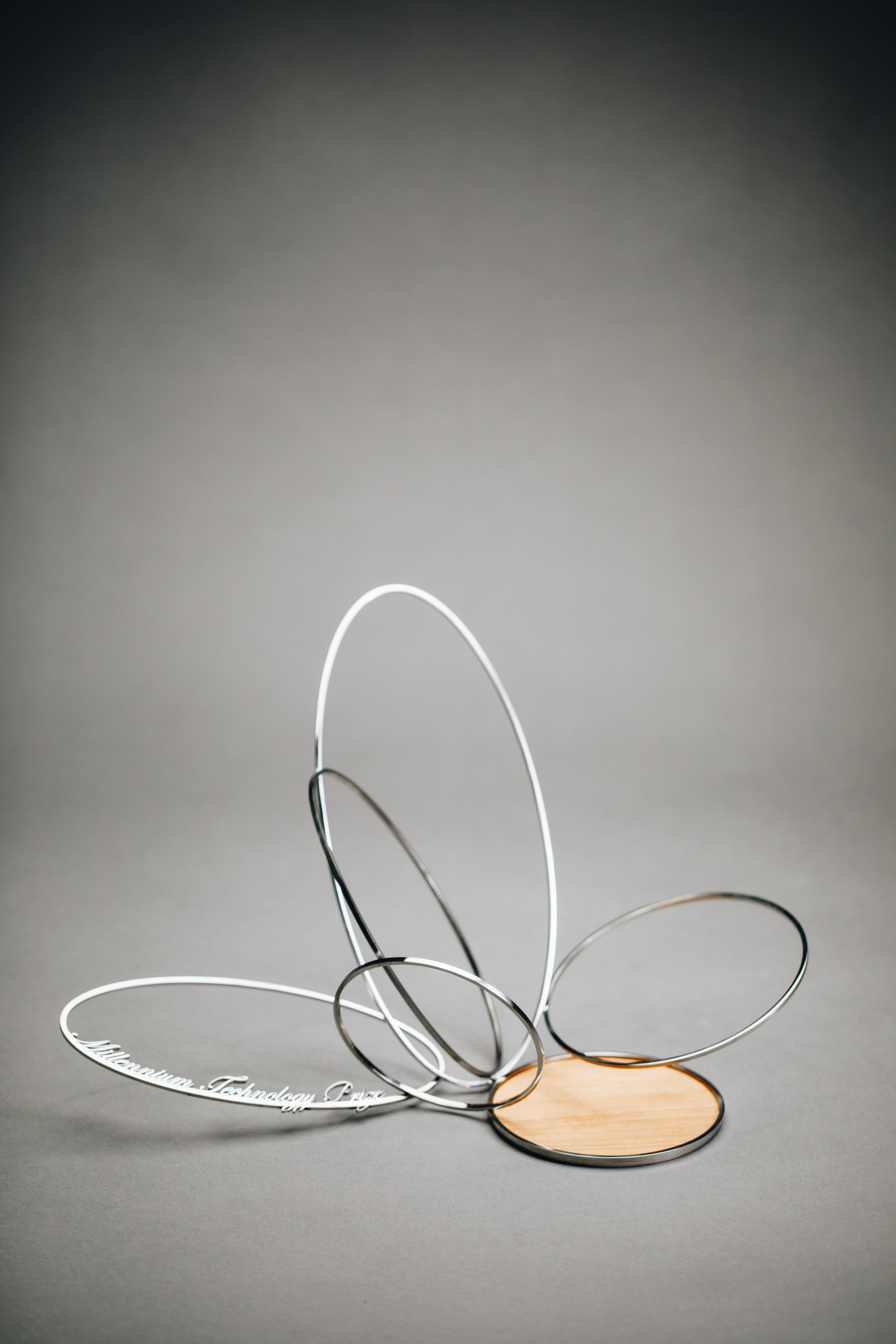
Millennium Technology Prize "Milky Way"

The Millennium Technology Prize (Finnish: Millennium-teknologiapalkinto) is one of the world's largest technology prizes. It is awarded once every two years by Technology Academy Finland, an independent foundation established by Finnish industries, academic institutions, and the state of Finland. The patron of the prize is the President of Finland. The Millennium Technology Prize is Finland's tribute to innovations for a better life. The aims of the prize are to promote technological research and Finland as a high-tech Nordic welfare state. The prize was inaugurated in 2004.

== The Prize ==
The idea of the prize came originally from the Finnish academician Pekka Jauho, with American real estate investor and philanthropist Arthur J Collingsworth encouraging its establishment. The Prize celebrates innovations that have a favorable and sustainable impact on quality of life and well-being of people. The innovations also must have been applied in practice and stimulate further research and development. Compared to the Nobel Prize the Millennium Technology Prize is a technology award, whereas the Nobel Prize is a science award. Furthermore, the Nobel Prize is awarded for basic research, but the Millennium Technology Prize may be given to a recently conceived innovation which is still being developed. The Millennium Technology Prize is not intended as a reward for lifetime achievement.

The Millennium Technology Prize is awarded by Technology Academy Finland (formerly Millennium Prize Foundation and Finnish Technology Award Foundation), established in 2002 by eight Finnish organisations supporting technological development and innovation. The prize sum is 1 million euros (~US$1.3 million). The Millennium Technology Prize is awarded every second year and its patron is the president of Finland.

Universities, research institutes, national scientific and engineering academies, high-tech companies, and other organizations around the world are eligible to nominate individuals or groups for the award. Nominations are accepted from any field except military technology. In accordance with the rules of the Technology Academy Finland, a proposal concerning the winner of the Millennium Technology Prize is made to the board of the foundation by the eight-member international selection committee, and the final decision on the prize winner is made by the board of the foundation.

== International Selection Committee (ISC) ==
Current members of the selection committee include:

- Päivi Törmä, Professor at Aalto University and Chairman of ISC 2017-2024.
- Nigel Brandon, Dean of the Faculty of Engineering at Imperial College London
- Thierry E. Klein, President of Bell Labs Solutions Research at Nokia Bell Labs
- Ilan Spillinger, Executive Vice President and Corporate CTO of IMEC.
- Sirpa Jalkanen, Professor of Immunology at University of Turku
- Cecilia Tortajada, Professor in Practice in Environmental Innovation (Interdisciplinary Studies) in the University of Glasgow

Past committee members include:

- Jonathan Knowles, Visiting Professor, FIMM, HiLIFE, University of Helsinki, Finland
- Tero Ojanperä, Chairman of Silo.AI company
- Jarl-Thure Eriksson, Chancellor of Åbo Akademi University and former Rector of Tampere University of Technology (Finland)
- Eva-Mari Aro, Professor in Molecular Plant Biology at University of Turku (Finland)
- Jaakko Astola, Professor of Signal Processing at Tampere University of Technology (Finland)
- Craig R. Barrett, Retired CEO/Chairman of the Board of Intel Corporation (United States)
- Riitta Hari, Director of both the multidisciplinary Brain Research Unit of the Low Temperature Laboratory at Aalto University and the national Centre of Excellence on Systems Neuroscience and Neuroimaging Research (Finland)
- Konrad Osterwalder, Former Rector of the United Nations University and Under-Secretary-General of the United Nations (Switzerland)
- Ayao Tsuge, President of the Japan Federation of Engineering Society and President of Japan International Science and Technology Exchange Center (Japan)

== Laureates ==
Year	Inventor	Nationality	Invention	Notes
2004	Tim Berners-Lee	United Kingdom	World Wide Web	Inventor of the World Wide Web from United Kingdom, was announced on 15 April 2004, as the first winner of the award. The Prize was presented to Berners-Lee at a ceremony in the Finlandia Hall in Helsinki by the President of Finland, Tarja Halonen on 15 June 2004. Selection committee studied 78 nominations from 22 countries for the 2004 prize.
2006	Shuji Nakamura	Japan (born); United States (citizen)	Blue and white LEDs	Inventor of high brightness blue and white LEDs used in lighting, computer displays and new-generation DVDs, from California, United States, was announced on 15 June 2006, as the second winner of the award. The Prize was presented to Nakamura at a ceremony in the Helsinki Fair Centre in Helsinki by the President of Finland Tarja Halonen on 8 September 2006. Selection committee studied 109 nominations from 32 countries for the 2006 prize.
2008	Robert Langer (Grand Award winner)	United States	Innovative biomaterials for controlled drug release and tissue regeneration	Inventor of controlled drug release from the United States, was announced on 11 June 2008, as the third winner of the award. The prize 800,000 euros was presented to Langer at a ceremony in Helsinki by the President of Finland Tarja Halonen "for his invention and development of innovative biomaterials for controlled drug release and tissue regeneration that have saved human lives and improved the lives of millions of patients."
2008	Alec Jeffreys (finalist and laureate)	United Kingdom	DNA fingerprinting technique	Committee's reasoning: "the DNA fingerprinting technique developed by Professor Sir Alec Jeffreys has revolutionized the field of forensic science and methods of defining family relationships." Professor Sir Alec Jeffreys was awarded a prize of 115,000 euros.
2008	Andrew Viterbi (finalist and laureate)	Italy (born); United States (citizen)	Viterbi algorithm	Committee's reasoning: "Dr. Andrew Viterbi's innovation is the Viterbi algorithm, used to avoid errors in wireless communications systems and devices such as mobile phones." Dr. Andrew Viterbi was awarded a prize of 115,000 euros.
2008	Emmanuel Desurvire (finalist and laureate)	France	Erbium doped fiber amplifier	Committee's reasoning: "The fourth innovation awarded, the erbium-doped fibre amplifier (EDFA) invented by Professor Emmanuel Desurvire, Dr. Randy Giles and Professor David Payne, has vastly increased the transmission capacity of the global optical fibre networks that carry telephone and Internet communications signals." The group was awarded a prize of 115,000 euros.
2008	Randy Giles (finalist and laureate)	United States	Erbium doped fiber amplifier	Committee's reasoning: "The fourth innovation awarded, the erbium-doped fibre amplifier (EDFA) invented by Professor Emmanuel Desurvire, Dr. Randy Giles and Professor David Payne, has vastly increased the transmission capacity of the global optical fibre networks that carry telephone and Internet communications signals." The group was awarded a prize of 115,000 euros.
2008	David N. Payne (finalist and laureate)	United Kingdom	Erbium doped fiber amplifier	Committee's reasoning: "The fourth innovation awarded, the erbium-doped fibre amplifier (EDFA) invented by Professor Emmanuel Desurvire, Dr. Randy Giles and Professor David Payne, has vastly increased the transmission capacity of the global optical fibre networks that carry telephone and Internet communications signals." The group was awarded a prize of 115,000 euros.
2010	Michael Grätzel (Grand Award winner)	Switzerland	Dye-sensitized solar cells	Inventor of third generation dye-sensitized solar cells. The president of Finland Tarja Halonen handed the 800,000 euros Grand Prize and the prize trophy "Peak" to Grätzel at the Grand Award Ceremony at the Finnish National Opera in Helsinki on 9 June 2010.
2010	Richard Friend (finalist and laureate)	United Kingdom	organic light-emitting diodes	Committee's reasoning: "The initial innovation of Professor Sir Richard Friend, organic Light Emitting Diodes (LEDs), was a crucial milestone in plastic electronics. Electronic paper, cheap organic solar cells and illuminating wall paper are examples of the revolutionary future products his work has made possible." Professor Sir Richard Friend was awarded a prize of 150,000 euros.
2010	Stephen Furber (finalist and laureate)	United Kingdom	ARM 32-bit RISC microprocessor	Committee's reasoning: "Stephen Furber is the principal designer of the ARM 32-bit RISC microprocessor, an innovation that revolutionised mobile electronics. The ingeniously designed processor enabled the development of cheap, powerful handheld, battery-operated devices. In the past 25 years nearly 20 billion ARM based chips have been manufactured." Professor Stephen Furber was awarded a prize of 150,000 euros.
2012	Linus Torvalds	Finland (born); United States (citizen)	Linux kernel	Committee's reasoning: "for creating the Linux kernel, a new open source operating system for computers. 73,000 man years have been spent fine-tuning the code. Today millions use computers, smartphones and digital video recorders that run on Linux. Linus Torvalds's achievements have had a great impact on shared software development, networking and the openness of the web."
2012	Shinya Yamanaka	Japan	Induced pluripotent stem cell	Committee's reasoning: "in recognition of his discovery of a new method to develop induced pluripotent stem cells for medical research. Using his method to create stem cells, scientists all over the world are making great strides in research in medical drug testing and biotechnology. This should one day lead to the successful growth of implant tissues for clinical surgery and combating intractable diseases such as cancer, diabetes and Alzheimer's."
2014	Stuart Parkin	United Kingdom	Advances in magnetic storage capacity	Committee's reasoning: "in recognition of his discoveries, which have enabled a thousand-fold increase in the storage capacity of magnetic disk drives. Parkin's innovations have led to a huge expansion of data acquisition and storage capacities, which in turn have underpinned the evolution of large data centres and cloud services, social networks, music and film distribution online."
2016	Frances Arnold	United States	Directed evolution	Committee's reasoning: "in recognition of her discoveries that launched the field of ‘directed evolution’, which mimics natural evolution to create new and better proteins in the laboratory. This technology uses the power of biology and evolution to solve many important problems, often replacing less efficient and sometimes harmful technologies. Thanks to directed evolution, sustainable development and clean technology become available in many areas of industry that no longer have to rely on non-renewable raw materials."
2018	Tuomo Suntola	Finland	Atomic layer deposition	Committee's reasoning: "Suntola's prize-winning ALD (atomic layer deposition) innovation is a nanoscale technology in use all over the world. ALD is used to manufacture ultra-thin material layers for microprocessors and digital memory devices. The technology allows building of complex, three-dimensional structures one atomic layer at a time. The extremely thin isolating or conducting films needed in microprocessors and computer memory devices can only be manufactured using the ALD technology developed by Tuomo Suntola."
2020*	Shankar Balasubramanian & David Klenerman	India (born); UK (citizen)	Next Generation DNA Sequencing	Committee's reasoning: "Professors Shankar Balasubramanian and David Klenerman received the 2020 Millennium Technology Prize for their innovation of Next Generation DNA Sequencing (NGS), technology that enables fast, accurate, low-cost and large-scale genome sequencing – the process of determining the complete DNA sequence of an organism’s make-up. The innovation has enhanced our basic understanding of life and it has converted biosciences into “big science”.."
2022	Martin Green	Australia	Passivated Emitter and Rear Cell (PERC)	The Prize was presented to Green at a ceremony in Helsinki by the President of Finland, Sauli Niinistö on 25 October 2022.
2024	B. Jayant Baliga	India (born); United States (citizen)	Insulated-gate bipolar transistor (IGBT)	Committee's reasoning: "for his innovation that has enabled dramatic reduction in worldwide electrical energy and petrol consumption."

*The ceremony was postponed due to the COVID-19 pandemic, and was held on 18 May 2021.

== See also ==
- Harvey Prize
- IMU Abacus Medal
- Japan Prize
- Kyoto Prize
- Nobel Prize
- Schock Prize
- Shaw Prize
- Tang Prize
- ACM Turing Award
- IET Faraday Medal
- IEEE Medal of Honor
- Queen Elizabeth Prize for Engineering
- List of engineering awards
