= Päivi Törmä =

Finnish professor of physics

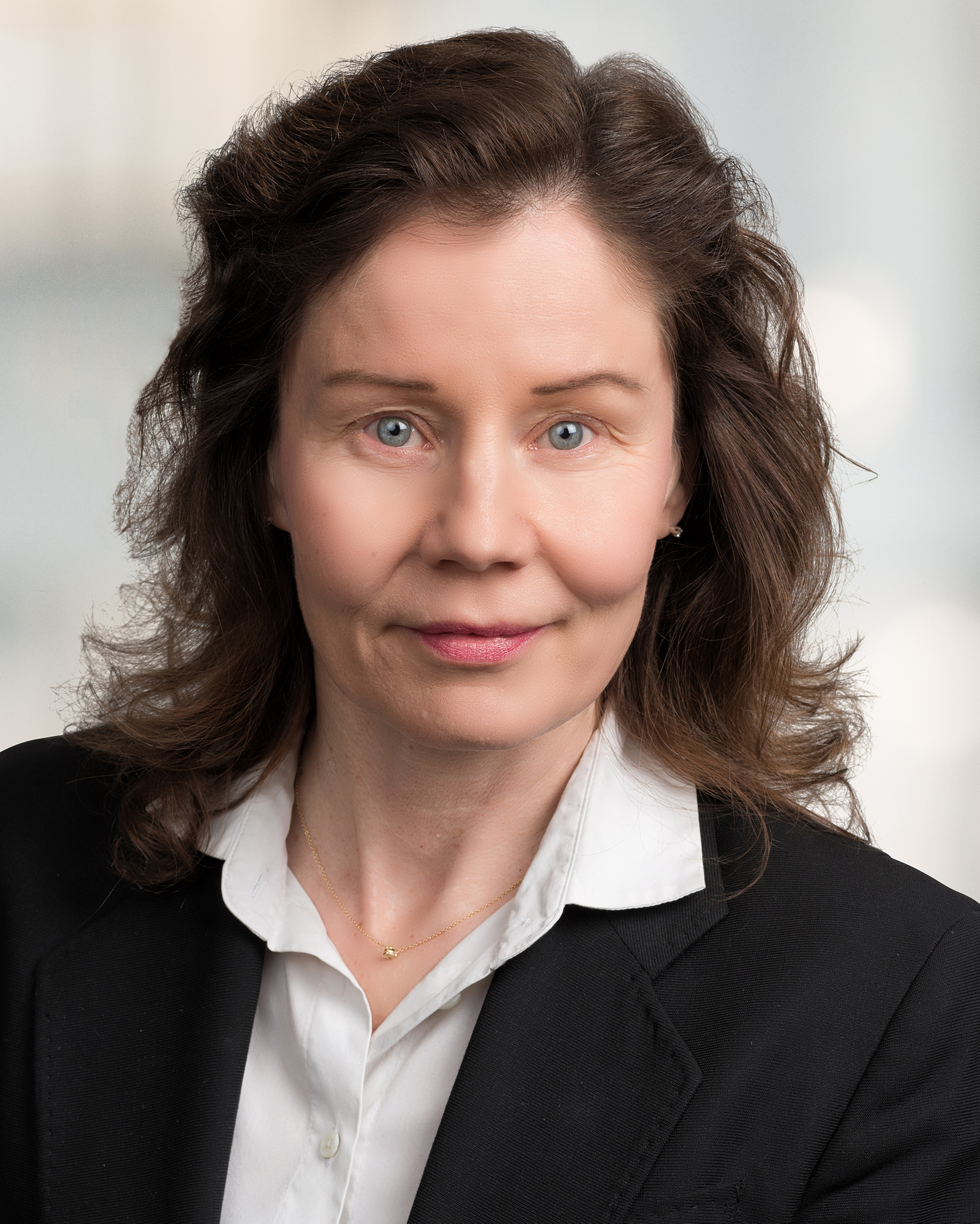
- Born: 19 October 1969 (age 56); Nivala, Finland
- Education: University of Helsinki
- Known for: Theory of superfluidity in ultracold gases and in flat bands, experiments in plasmonics
- Scientific career
- Fields: Physicist
- Doctoral advisor: Stig Stenholm
- Website: https://www.aalto.fi/en/department-of-applied-physics/quantum-dynamics-qd

Päivi Törmä is a Finnish physics professor at Aalto University. She works in the fields of quantum many-body physics, superconductivity, and nanophotonics.

== Biography ==
Päivi Törmä graduated with a master's degree from the University of Oulu and the University of Cambridge. She earned a PhD in theoretical physics from the University of Helsinki in 1996, under the supervision of Stig Stenholm. She worked as a postdoc at the University of Ulm in the group of Wolfgang Schleich, and as a Marie Curie Fellow at the University of Innsbruck in the group of Peter Zoller. In 2001 she became a professor at the University of Jyväskylä, Finland. She moved to Aalto University (at that time Helsinki University of Technology) in 2008, and was an invited guest professor at ETH Zurich in 2015. Päivi Törmä has served the academic community by leading the Nanoscience Centre at University of Jyväskylä 2002–2005, as director of the Academy of Finland Centre of Excellence in Computational Nanoscience 2013–2017, vice chair of the Academy of Finland board 2010–2014, and member of the Research and Innovation Council chaired by the prime minister of Finland 2007–2015. She was the chair of the Millennium Technology Prize International Selection Committee 2017–2024.

Päivi Törmä is married since 2001 and has two children, born 2002 and 2006.

== Research ==
In her doctoral research Päivi Törmä developed theory for optical multiports and their usage in measuring the quantum state of light. During her postdoc in Innsbruck, she was one of the first theorists to initiate work on ultracold Fermi gases, and proposed a spectroscopic probe of superfluidity. In Jyväskylä, she started experiments in nanophotonics and plasmonics. This research has led to pioneering observations of strong-coupling, lasing, and condensation phenomena in nanoplasmonic systems. Her theory work has revealed a quantum geometric contribution of superfluidity which can provide superconductivity in flat bands.

== Books ==
- Päivi Törmä and Klaus Sengstock (editors), Quantum Gas Experiments: Exploring Many-Body States, Imperial College Press, London and Singapore 2015.

== Awards ==
Päivi Törmä is an elected member of the Academia Europaea (2021), the Finnish Society of Sciences and Letters (2017), the Finnish Academy of Technology (2011), and the Finnish Academy of Science and Letters (2006). She received the Order of the First Class of the White Rose of Finland honour from the President of Finland in 2021. During 2017-2021 she was an Academy Professor of the Academy of Finland, and in 2013 she received the ERC Advanced Grant. In 2019 she received the Magnus Ehrnrooth Foundation Prize and in 2025 the Professor Theodor Homén Prize in Physics, both awarded by the Finnish Society of Sciences and Letters.
