= Häkkinen =

Häkkinen is a Finnish surname. Notable people with the surname include:

- Hilda Häkkinen (1894–2005), Finnish supercentenarian
- Eero Häkkinen (1911–1976), Finnish politician
- Kalevi Häkkinen (1928–2017), Finnish Olympic skier
- Markku Häkkinen (1946–2015), Finnish botanist; authority on the family Musaceae
- Hannu Häkkinen (born 1962), Finnish professor of computational nanoscience
- Mika Häkkinen (born 1968), Finnish racing driver, Formula One world champion
- Pasi Häkkinen (born 1977), Finnish ice hockey player
- Henri Häkkinen (born 1980), Finnish sport shooter

== See also ==
- Jay Hakkinen, American biathlete
