= Jukka Pekola =

Finnish physicist (born 1958)

- Born: 1958; Pihlajavesi, Finland
- Education: Helsinki University of Technology
- Awards: Simon Memorial Prize (2020)
- Scientific career
- Fields: Nanoelectronics; Low-temperature physics Quantum thermodynamics
- Institutions: University of Jyväskylä; Aalto University
- Thesis: Critical flow and persistent current experiments in superfluid ^{3}He (1984)
- Academic advisors: Olli Lounasmaa
- Website: https://www.aalto.fi/en/people/jukka-pekola

Jukka Pekka Pekola (born 1958) is a Finnish professor of experimental nanophysics at Aalto University. He has worked in the fields of low-temperature physics, nanoelectronics and quantum thermodynamics. He is the recipient of the 2020 Simon Memorial Prize.

== Biography ==
Jukka Pekola was born in 1958 in Pihlajavesi, Finland. He received his M.Sc. (1982) and D.Sc. (1984) degrees from the Helsinki University of Technology. His doctoral research focused on critical flow and persistent current experiments in superfluid helium-3. Both his M.Sc. and D.Sc. work were carried out at the university's Low Temperature Laboratory, founded and led by physicist Olli Lounasmaa. Pekola continued studying superfluid helium as a postdoctoral researcher at the University of California, Berkeley.

In 1992, Pekola joined the University of Jyväskylä as part of a new experimental nanophysics initiative launched by Mikko Paalanen. Shifting his research focus from superfluid helium to nanoelectronics, Pekola was instrumental in establishing experimental nanoscience as a research field in Jyväskylä. When Paalanen left in 1995 to become the director of the Low Temperature Laboratory at Helsinki, Pekola was appointed to a professorship in nanotechnology in 1997. Pekola played a role in establishing the interdisciplinary Nanoscience Center in Jyväskylä.

In 2002, Jukka Pekola was appointed professor of quantum nanophysics at the Helsinki University of Technology (later part of Aalto University), where he founded the PICO research group within the Low Temperature Laboratory. The Academy of Finland has twice named him an Academy Professor, recognizing his work with a first term in 2000–2005 and a second term in 2014–2018.

In addition to his research activities, Pekola has held roles within Finland's scientific community. He has served as the director of the Academy of Finland's Centre of Excellence in Quantum Technology and as the scientific director of OtaNano, the national research infrastructure for micro- and nanotechnologies. Pekola also directs InstituteQ, a national quantum institute formed by Aalto University, the University of Helsinki, and VTT Technical Research Centre of Finland.

Since 2010, he has served as Editor-in-Chief of the Journal of Low Temperature Physics.

== Research ==
Pekola's research explores how heat and energy behave in very small and cold systems—down to the scale of individual electrons and near absolute zero temperature.

In 1994, Pekola and his collaborators introduced the Coulomb blockade thermometer, a type of primary thermometer that can measure the temperature of electrons at extremely low temperatures without the need for external calibration. Pekola has also contributed to the development of electronic cooling techniques based on tunnel junctions between superconducting and normal metals.

In a 2006 experiment, Jukka Pekola's team demonstrated that heat can be transported by photons through a single channel in a superconducting circuit, confirming that the rate of flow is limited by the thermal conductance quantum. A subsequent 2009 experiment applied these principles to achieve electronic refrigeration at a distance, using impedance-matched superconducting leads to cool a metallic island through a single photonic channel.

In 2014 and 2015, Jukka Pekola's group built two nanoscale versions of Maxwell's demon thought experiment. Their first version, a Szilard engine, used information about a single electron's location to extract energy from the surrounding environment, effectively converting information into work. They then created a more advanced demon, where one circuit automatically measures and cools a second circuit, acting as an information-powered refrigerator. Both devices physically demonstrate the fundamental link between information and thermodynamics, showing that information can be used to perform work at the nanoscale.

In 2017, Pekola received a European Research Council (ERC) Advanced Grant for developing quantum heat engines and refrigerators and for research on quantum thermodynamics.

== Awards and honours ==
Pekola has received several awards, including the Simon Memorial Prize by the Institute of Physics in 2020. He has also received the Theodor Homén Prize by the Finnish Society of Science and Letters in 2016, the Finnish Cultural Foundation Award in 2024, and the Magnus Ehrnrooth Prize in Physics in 2025.

Pekola is a member of the Finnish Academy of Science and Letters and the Finnish Academy of Technical Sciences since 2001. He received the First Class Medal of the White Rose of Finland from the President of Finland in 2013.
