= Sahlberg =

Sahlberg is a Swedish surname.

- Asko Sahlberg
- Carl Reinhold Sahlberg, a Finnish entomologist
- Johan Reinhold Sahlberg, a Finnish entomologist
- Magnus Sahlberg
- Pär Axel Sahlberg (born 1954), Swedish politician
- Pasi Sahlberg
- Reinhold Ferdinand Sahlberg, a Finnish entomologist
