= Päivärinta =

Päivärinta is a Finnish surname. Notable people with the surname include:

- Pietari Päivärinta (1827–1913), Finnish writer and politician
- Pekka Päivärinta (born 1949), Finnish long-distance runner
- Lassi Päivärinta (born 1954), Finnish mathematician
- Susie Päivärinta (born 1964), Swedish singer and artist
- Lili Päivärinta (born 1966), Swedish singer and artist
- Pekka Päivärinta (born 1971), Finnish motorcycle racer
