= Hanna Vehkamäki =

Finnish physicist and academic

- Born: Hanna Tuula Katariina Vehkamäki; December 27, 1969 (age 56); Helsinki
- Education: University of Helsinki
- Awards: Knight, First Class, of the Order of the White Rose of Finland (2022)
- Scientific career
- Fields: Atmospheric particle formation Nucleation; Molecular clusters
- Workplaces: University College London; University of Helsinki
- Thesis: Gas-liquid nucleation in nonideal molecular systems (1997)
- Website: researchportal.helsinki.fi/en/persons/hanna-vehkamäki

Hanna Tuula Katariina Vehkamäki (née Vehkamäki, formerly Arstila, born 27 December 1969) is a Finnish theoretical physicist who works as a professor of computational aerosol physics at the University of Helsinki. Her group investigates atmospheric particle formation. 2022-2025 she served as vice dean responsible of well-being, equality, bilingual affairs, facilities, safety and security. In 2022, she was awarded Knight, First Class, of the Order of the White Rose of Finland.

== Early life and education ==
Vehkamäki was born in Helsinki. She got interested mathematics and physics at high school. She started studying at the University of Helsinki 1988. The undergraduate summer project, related to the formation of particles from atmospheric trace gases, she started working on 1992 was expanded first to a master's thesis and then to doctoral thesis and beyond, eventually becoming an important contribution to atmospheric science. She earned a master's degree in 1994 and a doctorate in 1998.

== Research and career ==
Vehkamäki was awarded a research fellowship at University College London and moved to the United Kingdom in 1998. She returned to Helsinki in 2000.

Vehkamäki was appointed as a professor at the University of Helsinki in 2009, and as a Research Council of Finland Academy professor for a six-year term 2026–2031. She studies formation of atmospheric aerosol particles, which can have a detrimental impact on air quality and a significant role in climate. The research consortium she leads, VILMA (Virtual laboratory for molecular level atmospheric transformations), combines experimental and computational atmospheric chemistry and physics, and was selected as a Research Council of Finland Centre of Excellence in 2022.

Vehkamäki established the equality and wellbeing group at her department (INAR, Institute for Atmospheric and Earth System Research) at the University of Helsinki in 2011, and has led similar initiatives at faculty, university and national levels.

=== Awards and honours ===
- 2010 Magnus Ehrnrooth Foundation Award
- 2015 University of Helsinki Maikki Friberg Award
- 2019 Resonanssi ry Badge of Honour
- 2022 Order of the White Rose of Finland Knight, First Class

=== Selected publications ===
- M. Kulmala; H. Vehkamäki; T. Petäjä; M. Dal Maso; A. Lauri; V.-M. Kerminen; W. Birmili; P.H. McMurry (March 2004). "Formation and growth rates of ultrafine atmospheric particles: a review of observations". Journal of Aerosol Science. 35 (2): 143–176. doi:10.1016/j.jaerosci.2003.10.003. ISSN 0021-8502. Wikidata Q57689802.
- Markku Kulmala; Jenni Kontkanen; Heikki Junninen; et al. (1 February 2013). "Direct observations of atmospheric aerosol nucleation". Science. 339 (6122): 943–946. doi:10.1126/science.1227385. ISSN 0036-8075. PMID 23430652. Wikidata Q57689182.
- João Almeida; Siegfried Schobesberger; Andreas Kürten; et al. (6 October 2013). "Molecular understanding of sulphuric acid-amine particle nucleation in the atmosphere". Nature. 502 (7471): 359–363. doi:10.1038/nature12663. ISSN 1476-4687. PMID 24097350. Wikidata Q43829556.
