= Pertti Alasuutari =

Finnish sociologist

- Education: University of Tampere
- Known for: Cultural sociology; qualitative research; epistemic governance; globalization of policy models
- Awards: Knight, First Class, Order of the White Rose of Finland (2006)
- Honors: Member of Academia Europaea (2020); Member of the Finnish Academy of Science and Letters (2004)
- Scientific career
- Fields: Sociology; Cultural studies; Qualitative research; Social theory
- Workplaces: Tampere University

Pertti Alasuutari is a Finnish sociologist and professor emeritus of Sociology at Tampere University. He is known for his contributions to cultural sociology, qualitative research methodology, and the study of policymaking, globalization, and epistemic governance. Alasuutari is the founding editor of the European Journal of Cultural Studies and a member of the Academia Europaea and the Finnish Academy of Science and Letters.

== Education ==
Alasuutari earned his Master of Arts in Sociology in 1983, Licentiate of Social Sciences in 1986, and Doctor of Social Sciences in 1990 from the University of Tampere.

== Career ==
Alasuutari began his academic career as a researcher for the Finnish Foundation for Alcohol Studies from 1983 to 1984. He subsequently joined the University of Tampere as an assistant professor of sociology, a position he held from 1985 to 1994. Following this, he served as acting professor from 1994 to 1997.

In 1997, Alasuutari was appointed professor of sociology. During his tenure as professor, he held several concurrent administrative leadership roles at the university. He served as director of the Research Institute for Social Sciences from 2002 to 2006 and as director of the University of Tampere Centre for Advanced Study (UTACAS) from 2003 to 2006. He subsequently acted as director of the International School of Social Sciences from 2006 to 2008 and as dean of the Faculty of Social Sciences from 2007 to 2008.

Alasuutari served two terms as an academy professor funded by the Academy of Finland: first from 2009 to 2013, and again from 2016 to 2020. He continued his role as professor of sociology until 2024, after which he transitioned to the position of professor emeritus.

=== Organizational activities ===
Alasuutari served as the president of the Association for Cultural Studies (ACS) from 2002 to 2004. He was also a member of the executive committee of the European Sociological Association during 2011–2013, 2013–2015, and 2021–2024. In addition, he has held editorial roles for several academic journals, including serving as editor of the Journal of Political Power since 2023, founding editor of the European Journal of Cultural Studies from 1996 to 2016, and editor-in-chief of Sociologia from 1993 to 1995.

== Research ==
A central theme in Alasuutari’s research is the analysis of cultural processes in contemporary society. His work spans studies of everyday life, media audiences, governance, globalization, and the methodology of social research. He is known for combining empirical, data-driven analysis with theoretical approaches that seek to explain social action.

Alasuutari has made significant contributions to qualitative research methodology. His book Laadullinen tutkimus is regarded as an influential work in Finland and has been credited with contributing to the declining dominance of questionnaire-based research. In his qualitative analyses, Alasuutari emphasizes the role of constitutive or meaning-forming rules—principles that shape how individuals interpret situations rather than strict rules that determine behaviour.

Early in his career, Alasuutari’s research had a strong ethnographic orientation, while later work has drawn more heavily on analyses of public debate and media discourse. His recent studies have focused on power and its relationship to the cultural dimensions of social life, particularly through the concept of epistemic governance. Although he often presents his findings in an accessible narrative style, he stresses that scientific reasoning and argumentation remain central to the structure of his work.

== Honors and awards ==
- Member of Academia Europaea (2020)
- Professor of the Year, Finnish Union of University Professors (2014)
- Knight, First Class, of the Order of the White Rose of Finland (2006)
- Fellow of the Institute for Advanced Social Research, University of Tampere (2005)
- Member of the Finnish Academy of Science and Letters (2004)

== Books ==
- Alasuutari, Pertti (1992). Desire and Craving: A Cultural Theory of Alcoholism. State University of New York Press.
- Alasuutari, Pertti (1995). Researching Culture: Qualitative Method and Cultural Studies. Sage.
- Alasuutari, Pertti (1998). An Invitation to Social Research. London; Thousand Oaks, Calif: Sage Publications. ISBN 978-0761957362.
- Alasuutari, Pertti (ed.) (1999). Rethinking the Media Audience. Sage.
- Alasuutari, Pertti (2004). Social Theory and Human Reality. Sage.
- Alasuutari, Pertti; Bickman, Leonard & Brannen, Julia (eds.) (2008). The SAGE Handbook of Social Research Methods. Sage.
- Alasuutari, Pertti & Qadir, Ali (eds.) (2014). National Policy-Making: Domestication of Global Trends. Routledge.
- Alasuutari, Pertti (2016). The Synchronization of National Policies: Ethnography of the Global Tribe of Moderns. Routledge.
- Alasuutari, Pertti & Qadir, Ali (2019). Epistemic Governance: Social Change in the Modern World. Palgrave Macmillan.
- Alasuutari, Pertti (2025). National Parliaments as a Global Institution: An Institutionalist View. Oxford University Press.
