= Victor Hartwall =

Finnish chemist and businessman, founder of Hartwall (1800–1857)

- Born: 27 October 1800; Åbo, Grand Duchy of Finland
- Died: 8 August 1857 (aged 56); Helsinki, Grand Duchy of Finland
- Occupations: Chemist, mining official, businessman
- Known for: Founding Hartwall mineralwater factory
- Spouse: Carolina Fredrika af Stenhof (m. 1830)

Victor Hartwall (27 October 1800 – 8 August 1857) was a Finnish chemist, mining official and businessman. He was one of the most versatile scientists and entrepreneurs in early 19th-century Finland, and is best known as the founder of the Hartwall mineral water factory in Helsinki, which under subsequent generations became Finland's largest soft drinks company.

== Biography ==
=== Early life and family ===
Victor Hartwall was born in 1800 as the son of a merchant and industrialist in Åbo. The family originates from the Tavastehus region. The surname Hartwall was first used by Victor's grandfather Erik Hartwall, a regimental clerk, in the mid-18th century. Victor's father Erik Hartwall was a burgher in Åbo who for a time owned the Old Shipyard, and later managed Metsämäki manor in the parish of St. Marie.

Victor was the only child in the family to reach adulthood. From an early age he was interested in experiments of all kinds, which led him naturally towards a scientific career.

=== Scientific career ===
Hartwall studied chemistry and wrote a master's thesis, Periculum chemico-mineralogicum de Wernerito, becoming a docent in 1824 and adjunct in 1825 at the Royal Academy of Åbo. He continued his studies in Uppsala under professor Jöns Jacob Berzelius, and pursued his scientific career at the University of Helsinki until 1833, by which time he had published five books — one in Swedish and three in French, in addition to his Latin thesis. He was a member of the Finnish Society of Sciences and Letters, the Societas pro Fauna et Flora Fennica and the Finnish Medical Society.

=== Civil service career ===
The precarious financial situation of a scientist was incompatible with starting a family, and Hartwall abandoned his scientific career when he married Carolina Fredrika af Stenhof in 1830. In 1833 he was appointed head of the assay office, responsible for examining metal content in gold, silver and tin objects. The following year he was appointed mining commissioner at the Finnish Mining Board. In 1844 he was granted the dignity of mining master and appointed a member of the Manufactures Board.

=== Mineral water factory ===
Since his student days, Hartwall had been interested in the production of mineral water. On the recommendation of Berzelius, he was called to establish and set up a mineral water factory in Odessa in 1828–1829, where he artificially produced Karlsbad water by adding minerals believed to have medicinal properties to pure water. Upon returning to Finland, he began planning his own water factory.

Together with Pehr Adolf von Bonsdorff, professor of chemistry at the university, Hartwall established a mineral water preparation facility in Helsinki in 1832. Initially production was very modest, primarily for domestic use, but when von Bonsdorff died in 1839 Hartwall obtained a privilege and continued production in his own name.

For approximately forty years the Hartwall mineral water factory was located in the cellar of Hartwall's property at Fabiansgatan 20, where the university's administrative building now stands. The mineral water was sold in two places: at a café in the university's botanical garden, and at the Brunnshuset (Spa House), which Hartwall had helped establish and where his water began to be served in 1838. The mineral water grew increasingly popular, attracting visitors from as far as northern and eastern Finland.

=== Later years and legacy ===
On New Year's Day 1857, Victor Hartwall suffered a stroke and died that summer at a relatively young age. Production was managed for some years by Adolf Moberg, professor of physics at the university, before Hartwall's son August Ludvig Hartwall took over the business.

Under August Ludvig's leadership, the factory began producing carbonated water in addition to the so-called health waters. As the popularity of the Brunnshuset declined, carbonated waters came to occupy an ever-larger share of production, served as table drinks and soft drinks. On hot summer days, Helsinki residents flocked to Hartwall's water kiosks.

The factory was moved in the 1870s to the so-called Salgren building at Alexandersgatan 26, near Senate Square, and later to its own premises on Kalevagatan. The business passed through four generations of the Hartwall family, eventually becoming a limited company under Kay-Erik Hartwall in the 1940s, developing into Finland's largest soft drinks company.

== Selected publications ==
- Periculum chemico-mineralogicum de Wernerito (1824)
- Undersökningar af några mineralier (1828)
- Analyse des Aeschynits, Annalen der Physik und Chemie (1829)
- Analyse des Phenakits, Ann. d. Chemie und Physik (1833)
- Analyse des Phenakits von Ural, Annalen der Physik und Chemie (1834)
