= Marek Grad =

Polish geophysicist, seismologist, and academic (1951–2020)

Marek Andrzej Grad (November 19, 1951 – May 17, 2020) was a Polish geophysicist and seismologist, and a professor of Earth sciences. He worked in the Department of Physics of Litosphere of the Institute of Geophysics at the University of Warsaw.

In the years 1991-2002 he was the director of the Institute of Geophysics of the Faculty of Physics at the University of Warsaw. In the years 2012-2014 dean of the Division III Polish Academy of Sciences (Science and Earth Sciences). From 2014 he has been a member of the board of curators of this faculty. A foreign member of the Finnish Academy of Sciences, he was a member of the steering committee of the NATO Science for Peace program

The scientific activity of Marek Grad was seismology, especially structural seismology. He studied the Earth's crust and the upper mantle using the methods of explosive seismology (mainly the so-called deep seismic sounding). He participated in research in Finland, Spitsbergen and West Antarctica, among others. He was the creator of the digital map of Mohorovičić discontinuity for the European Plate. This was the first map that shows the depth of Mohorovičić discontinuity for the whole of Europe. He was the coordinator of such physical experiments as POLONAISE'97, CELEBRATION 2000, ALP 2002, SUDETES 2003, TOR, PASSEQ 2006-2008 and 13 BB-STAR. He also popularized science.
