= Virpi =

Female given name

Virpi is a feminine given name. Notable people with the name include:

- Virpi Hämeen-Anttila (born 1958), Finnish writer and translator
- Virpi Juutilainen (born 1961), Finnish ski-orienteering competitor
- Virpi Lummaa, Finnish evolutionary biologist
- Virpi Moskari, Finnish Mezzo-soprano
- Virpi Niemelä (1936–2006), Finnish Argentine astronomer
- Virpi Niemi (born 1966), Finnish cross-country skier
- Virpi Sarasvuo (born 1976), Finnish cross-country skier
- Virpi Talvitie (born 1961), Finnish illustrator
- Virpi Timonen (born 1972), Finnish social scientist
