= Pietari =

Pietari is a Finnish male name and an interpretation of the names Petrus and Peter. It may refer to:

- Pietari, Finnish and Karelian exonym for Saint Petersburg, Russia
- Pietari Inkinen (born 1980), Finnish violinist and conductor
- Pietari Jääskeläinen (born 1947), Finnish politician
- Pietari Holopainen (born 1982), Finnish professional football player
- Pietari Päivärinta (1827–1913), Finnish writer and Diet member
- Pietari Särkilahti, Finnish disciple of Martin Luther
- Pietari Kalm, Swedish-Finnish explorer, botanist, naturalist
