= Bembidion hastii =

Scientific classification
- Kingdom: Animalia
- Phylum: Arthropoda
- Class: Insecta
- Order: Coleoptera
- Suborder: Adephaga
- Family: Carabidae
- Genus: Bembidion
- Species: B. hastii

Binomial name
- Bembidion hastii Sahlberg, 1827

Species of beetle

Bembidion hastii is a species of ground beetle in the family Carabidae. It is a Holarctic species found in northern Eurasia from Norway to the Far East and in North America (Alaska and Canada).
