= Finnish Society of Sciences and Letters =

Learned Society

The Finnish Society of Sciences and Letters (Swedish: Finska Vetenskaps-Societeten r.f., Finnish: Suomen Tiedeseura r.y., Latin: Societas Scientiarum Fennica) is a Finnish learned society for natural sciences, social sciences and humanities. It is a bilingual (Swedish and Finnish) science academy and the oldest of the four science academies in Finland.

The society was founded in 1838 and is based in Helsinki. It has a total of 120 full ordinary Finnish members, excluding members who have reached the age of 67 (a member who reaches the age of 67 retains the rights as a member but leaves his or her chair open for election of a new member), and about 120 foreign members. It is divided into four sections: I: mathematics and physics, II: biosciences, III: humanities, and IV: social sciences.

The society publishes a yearbook, Sphinx, and the book series Commentationes Humanarum Litterarum, Commentationes Scientiarum Socialium, Bidrag till kännedom av Finlands natur och folk and The History of Learning and Science in Finland 1828-1918. It also awards a number of prizes and grants for scientific and scholarly work.

In addition to the Finnish Society of Sciences and Letters, there are three other academies in Finland: the Finnish Academy of Science and Letters and two academies of engineering sciences. The four Finnish academies have an umbrella organisation for cooperation, the Council of Finnish Academies.

== Prizes ==
The society awards prizes for scientific excellence.

=== E.J. Nyström Prize ===
E.J. Nyström Prize is awarded annually since 1962 for scientific accomplishments. The prize alternates between the four sections of the society.

=== Theodor Homén Prize ===
Theodor Homén Prize was established in 1963 and initially awarded every three years. Currently it is awarded annually, alternating between physics and the history of Finland.

- 1963: Lennart Simons (physics)
- 1966: Pirkko Rommi (history)
- 1969: Olli Lounasmaa (physics)
- 1972: Jaakko Paavolainen (history)
- 1975: Eero Holopainen (physics)
- 1978: Seppo Suvanto (history)
- 1981: Juhani Kantele (physics)
- 1984: Jouko Vahtola (history)
- 1987: Stig Stenholm (physics)
- 1990: Henrik Stenius (history)
- 1993: Matti Krusius (physics)
- 1996: Osmo Jussila (history)
- 1999: Keijo Kajantie (physics)
- 2002: Kari Tarkiainen (history)
- 2004: Vesa Ruuskanen (physics)
- 2005: Max Engman (history)
- 2006: Juha Äystö (physics)
- 2007: Jorma Tuominiemi (physics)
- 2007: Henrik Lilius (history)
- 2008: Mikko Paalanen (physics)
- 2009: Markku Kuisma (history)
- 2010: Hannu Koskinen (physics)
- 2011: Nils Erik Villstrand (history)
- 2012: Matts Roos (physics)
- 2013: Marjatta Hietala (history)
- 2014: Kaj Nordlund (physics)
- 2015: Laura Kolbe (history)
- 2016: Jukka Pekola (physics)
- 2017: Hannu Riikonen (history)
- 2018: Hannu Häkkinen (physics)
- 2018: Hannu Salmi (history)
- 2019: Helena Aksela (physics)
- 2020: Kirsi Vainio-Korhonen (history)
- 2021: Timo Vesala (physics)
- 2021: Henrik Meinander (history)
- 2022: Mika Sillanpää (physics)
- 2022: Petri Karonen (history)
- 2023: Ronald Österbacka (physics)

=== Magnus Ehrnrooth Foundation Prize ===
Magnus Ehrnrooth Foundation Prize is awarded annually since 1986 and it alternates between mathematics, chemistry and physics.

- 1986: Olli Lehto (mathematics)
- 1989: Risto Nieminen (physics)
- 1990: Mauri Lounasmaa (chemistry)
- 1991: Arto Salomaa (mathematics)
- 1992: Pekka Hautojärvi (physics)
- 1993: Pentti Törmälä (chemistry)
- 1994: Seppo Rickman (mathematics)
- 1995: Matti Manninen (physics)
- 1996: Tapani Pakkanen (chemistry)
- 1997: Sören Illman (mathematics)
- 1998: Kari Enqvist (physics)
- 1999: Per Stenius (chemistry)
- 2000: Pertti Mattila (mathematics)
- 2001: Kalle-Antti Suominen (physics)
- 2002: Markku Leskelä (chemistry)
- 2003: Kari Astala (mathematics)
- 2004: Kimmo Saarinen (physics)
- 2005: Kari Rissanen (chemistry)
- 2006: Lassi Päivärinta (mathematics)
- 2007: Kai Nordlund (physics)
- 2008: Marja-Liisa Riekkola (chemistry)
- 2009: Antti Kupiainen (mathematics)
- 2010: Hanna Vehkamäki (physics)
- 2011: Tapio Salmi (chemistry)
- 2012: Pekka Koskela (mathematics)
- 2013: Ilpo Vattulainen (physics)
- 2014: Peter Slotte (chemistry)
- 2015: Kaisa Nyberg (mathematics)
- 2016: Kimmo Kainulainen (physics)
- 2017: Peter Johansson (additional research grant)
- 2018: Eero Saksman (mathematics)
- 2019: Päivi Törmä (physics)
- 2020: Mikko Ritala (chemistry)
- 2021: Jarkko Kari (mathematics)
- 2022: Aleksi Vuorinen (physics)
- 2023: Mauri Kostiainen (chemistry)

=== PhD Mikael Björnberg Memorial Fund ===
The PhD Mikael Björnberg Memorial Fund was established in 2002 by the society to honor the memory of the Finnish physicist Mikael Björnberg, who had died in an aviation accident in 2000 at the age of only 35. The Finnish Society of Sciences and Letters awards prizes to young outstanding theoretical physicists from the fund. The first prize was awarded in 2004 and since 2013 it has been awarded annually. In 2025 the amount of the prize was €10 000 .

| Year | Laureate |
|---|---|
| 2004 | Timo Lähde |
| 2006 | Lotta Mether |
| 2013 | Mikael Långvik |
| 2014 | Tommi Markkanen |
| 2015 | Anna-Stiina Suur-Uski |
| 2016 | Tommi Tenkanen |
| 2017 | Fredrik Granberg |
| 2018 | Heikki Mäntysaari |
| 2019 | Timo Kärkkäinen |
| 2020 | Matias Mannerkoski |
| 2021 | Joonas Nättilä |
| 2022 | Jani Penttala |
| 2023 | Saga Säppi |
| 2024 | Kukka-Emilia Huhtinen |
| 2025 | Joonas Hirvonen |

=== Lorenz Lindelöf Prize ===
Lorenz Lindelöf Prize is awarded every three years since 2013 for scientific work in mathematics.

- 2013: Saksman Eero
- 2016: Nummelin Esa
- 2019: Stenberg Rolf
- 2022: Hytönen Tuomas
