= Johanna Mappes =

Finnish evolutionary ecologist

Riitta Johanna Mappes (born 13 October 1965 in Valkeakoski, Finland) is an evolutionary ecologist based in Finland. Her research focuses on interspecific interactions, such as those between predators and prey. She is known for her work on the evolution of aposematic signals and mimicry in chemically defended prey, the evolution of signal polymorphism, the evolution of bacterial virulence, and the evolution of sexual and asexual reproduction. Her main study species include the wood tiger moth (Arctia plantaginis), vipers (Viperidae), the Colorado potato beetle (Leptinotarsa decemlineata) and the drumming wolf-spider (Hygrolycosa rubrofasciata).

Mappes earned her MSc degree in 1991 and her PhD in 1994, both from the University of Jyväskylä, Finland. Her doctoral thesis focused on reproductive tactics and maternal care in shield bugs, particularly the parent bug (Elasmucha grisea). In 2003 The Academy of Finland awarded Mappes the 'Young Dynamic Researcher Award' for her research merits in developing the ‘novel world method’ to study the evolution of aposematism.

She was elected as a Research Professor at the Academy of Finland from 2009-2013, and again from 2019-2023. Mappes served as a Professor of Evolutionary Ecology at the University of Jyväskylä from 2008-2019, where she headed the Centre of Excellence in Biological Interactions for the Academy of Finland from 2012-2018. In 2017 she was elected member of the Finnish Society of Sciences and Letters and in 2018 she became an honorary member of the American Academy of Arts and Sciences (AAAS). In 2019 she was invited to membership in the Royal Physiographic Society of Lund. As of 2020, she is a Professor of Ecology at the University of Helsinki, Research Professor at the Academy of Finland, and member of the governing board for the Finnish Academy of Science and Letters.
