= Mappes =

Mappes is a surname. Notable people with the surname include:

- George Mappes (1865–1934), American baseball player
- Johanna Mappes (born 1965), Finnish evolutionary ecologist

== See also ==
- Mappus
