= Kaisa Miettinen =

Finnish mathematician and educator

- Born: July 25, 1965; Sulkava, Finland
- Education: University of Jyväskylä
- Awards: Väisälä Prize
- Scientific career
- Fields: Multiobjective optimization and Multi-criteria decision analysis
- Workplaces: Department of Mathematical Information Technology, University of Jyväskylä, Finland
- Website: users.jyu.fi/~miettine/engl.html

Kaisa Miettinen (born 25 July 1965) is a Finnish mathematician and the former vice rector of the University of Jyväskylä in Finland. She is a professor of industrial optimization with the Faculty of Information Technology, University of Jyväskylä, Finland. In addition, she heads the Multiobjective Optimization Group (former name Industrial Optimization Group).

Her research interests include multiobjective optimization (theory, methods, and software), multiple-criteria decision making, nonlinear programming, evolutionary algorithms, hybrid approaches, data-driven decision support, decision analytics as well as various applications of optimization.

== Education ==
Miettinen received her Master of Science degree in mathematics in 1988, her Licentiate of Philosophy degree in mathematical information technology in 1990, and her PhD (Doctor of Philosophy) degree in mathematical information technology in 1994, all from the University of Jyväskylä, Jyväskylä, Finland.

== Career ==
Since 1987, Miettinen has held various teaching and research positions funded by the Academy of Finland and University of Jyväskylä and became adjunct professor in information technology in the area of optimization at the University of Jyväskylä in 1997. In 1998, Miettinen worked with the International Institute for Applied Systems Analysis, Laxenburg, Austria. In 2004–2007, she was a professor of financial mathematics at Helsinki School of Economics (currently Aalto University School of Business). Since 2007 she has worked at the University of Jyväskylä as a professor of industrial optimization and in 2012-2017 as the vice-rector in charge of research. In 2011–2012 she was a part-time visiting professor at the KTH Royal Institute of Technology, Department of Mathematics, Division of Optimization and Systems Theory, in Stockholm, Sweden. She is an adjunct professor in Mathematical Methods and Applications of Decision Making at the Aalto University since 2008.

Miettinen has been the president of the International Society on Multiple Criteria Decision Making (2011–2015), member of the steering committee of EMO (Evolutionary Multiobjective Optimization) 2008 to present, member of the Systems Analysis Division of the Scientific Advisory Board for Defence, 2006–2018, member of the board of directors of the Jyväskylä Doctoral Programme in Computing and Mathematical Sciences (COMAS) at the University of Jyväskylä 2003–2005, 2007 to present, and a member or deputy of the board of the Helsinki Institute of Physics, 2012–2015.

== Awards and recognitions ==
- On December 14, 2009, she was awarded the Väisälä Prize of the Finnish Academy of Science and Letters in the field of Mathematics for her research achievements.
- On June 16, 2011, she received the MCDM Conference Chairmanship Award of the International Society on Multiple Criteria Decision Making.

== Software ==
In 1995, Miettinen, along with her colleagues at the University of Jyväskylä, developed and made available WWW-NIMBUS and IND-NIMBUS. WWW-NIMBUS was the first interactive multiobjective optimization software operating via the Internet. IND-NIMBUS is a multiobjective optimization software framework containing implementations of several interactive multiobjective optimization methods developed at the University of Jyväskylä. Currently, she is developing with her research group, an open source software framework for interactive multiobjective optimization.

== Books ==
Miettinen has written a monograph entitled Nonlinear Multiobjective Optimization (Kluwer/Springer, 1999). She is co-editor of the proceedings of four Dagstuhl seminars. She has edited collections of articles entitled Multiobjective Optimization: Interactive and Evolutionary Approaches with J. Branke, K. Deb and R. Slowinski (Springer, 2008) and Evolutionary Algorithms in Engineering and Computer Science with M.M. Mäkelä, P. Neittaanmäki and J. Periaux (John Wiley & Sons, 1999).

== Research publications ==
Miettinen has over 140 peer-reviewed articles published in renowned journals and conference proceedings.
