= Neil S. Sullivan =

New Zealand-born physicist (born 1942)

- Born: Neil Samuel Charles Sullivan; January 18, 1942 (age 84); New Zealand
- Education: Otago University, Harvard University
- Awards: Prix Saintour; La Caze Physics Prize
- Scientific career
- Fields: Physics
- Workplaces: University of Florida; Centre d'Etudes Nucleaires
- Thesis: Nuclear Magnetism of Solid Hydrogen at Low Temperatures (1972)
- Doctoral advisor: Robert Pound
- Doctoral students: Michel Devoret

Neil Samuel Charles Sullivan (born January 18, 1942) is a distinguished professor of physics at the University of Florida. He is one of the founders of the Micro Kelvin Laboratory of the University of Florida. He is known for the discovery of quadrupolar glass phase of solid hydrogen.

== Early life and education ==
Born in New Zealand, Sullivan attended Otago University, where he received a Bachelor of Science degree in physics in 1964 followed by a Master of Science in 1965. In 1972, he obtained his PhD from Harvard University with the thesis Nuclear Magnetism of Solid Hydrogen at Low Temperatures, supervised by Robert Pound.

He became a naturalized United States citizen in 2004.

== Career ==
In the 1970s, Sullivan worked in France at CEA Saclay with Anatole Abragam. During this time, he was the doctoral advisor of Michel Devoret and Daniel Esteve.

Sullivan left France became a professor of physics at the University of Florida in 1983. He became chair of the Physics Department in 1989, a position he held until 1999. It was during this time that he was one of three lead collaborators to successfully propose the creation of the National High Magnetic Field Laboratory in Tallahassee, Florida. From 2000-2006, he served as Dean of the College of Liberal Arts and Sciences. He is also one of the editors-in-chief of the Journal of Low Temperature Physics. In 2024 he was given the title "Distinguished Professor".

In 1987 he was elected a Fellow of the American Physical Society, his citation reading "for fundamental studies of quantum solids using NMR techniques: contributions to orientational transitions in adsorbed N2 and solid hydrogen, discovery of a quadrupolar glass state in hydrogen, and elucidation of vacancies in solid 3He"
