= Armas Salonen =

Finnish Assyriologist

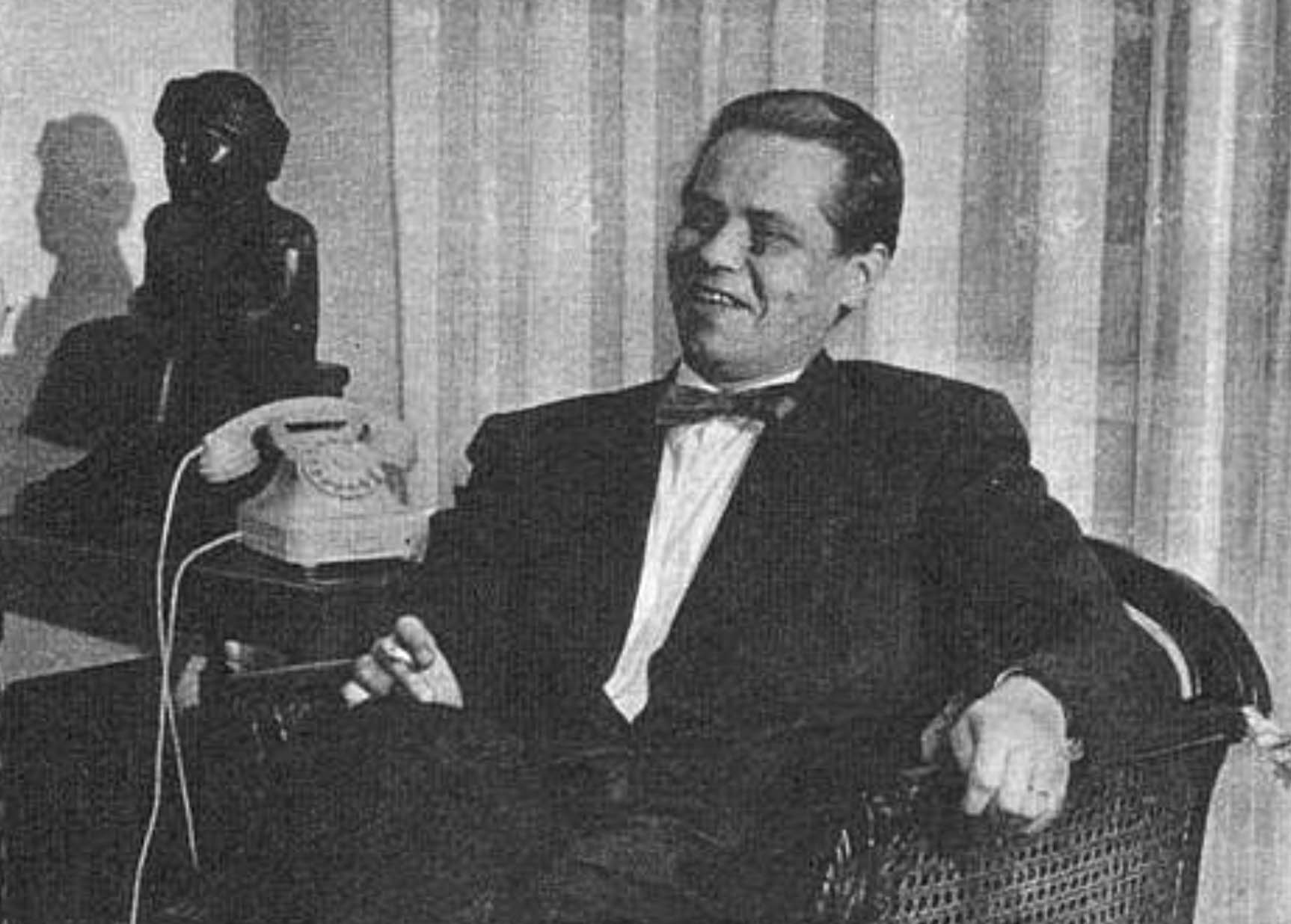
Armas Salonen

Armas Immanuel Salonen (17 January 1915 – 22 October 1981) was a Finnish Assyriologist.

Salonen graduated from high school in 1933. He studied at the University of Helsinki under professor Knut Tallqvist. Having obtained his bachelor's degree in 1936, he continued his studies in Germany and later on in the US, where he joined the Oriental Institute of the University of Chicago in 1947. There he participated in the Chicago Assyrian Dictionary project under professor A. Leo Oppenheim, focusing on etymological references.

Salonen received his PhD in 1950. From 1949 to 1978 he held the position of associate professor of Assyrian and Semitic Philology at the University of Helsinki. His research interests focused on the material culture and everyday life of Mesopotamia, such as its watercraft, vehicles and doors; a large part of his work consists of thematic glossaries of specialized terminology. He published the first Finnish translation of the Epic of Gilgamesh in 1943. He was also interested in the history of Persia and ancient Egypt, and had a command of Arabic. In 1957, together with Jussi Aro, he published the first Finnish translation of the Quran.

Salonen was elected member of the Finnish Academy of Science and Letters in 1950 and honorary member of the Finnish Egyptological Society in 1975.
