= Mappus =

Mappus is a German surname. Notable people with the surname include:

- Stefan Mappus (born 1966), German politician
- Ted Mappus (1926–2022), American politician

== See also ==
- Mappes
