= Mikael Björnberg =

PhD Mikael Björnberg 1965 – 2000

Mikael Björnberg (January 4, 1965 – November 17, 2000) was a Finnish physicist. In 1995, he completed his doctoral degree with a dissertation in theoretical nuclear physics.

From 1997 to 1998, he was a visiting researcher at Los Alamos National Laboratory. Afterward, he was employed at the VTT Technical Research Centre of Finland. He was Finland's representative on the OECD expert committee for nuclear waste.

Mikael Björnberg died in a plane crash in Hausjärvi at the age of 35. To honor his memory, the Finnish Society of Sciences and Letters established the PhD Mikael Björnberg Memorial Fund in 2002, which annually awards prizes to young outstanding theoretical physicists. The prize was awarded for the first time in 2004.
