= Carl Niclas von Hellens =

Finnish botanist

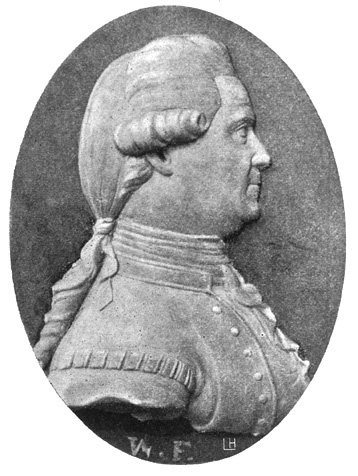
Carl Niclas von Hellens

Carl Niclas von Hellens Latinized as Carolus Nicolaus Hellenius (1 August 1745 – 26 January 1820) was a Finnish botanist. Trained under Carolus Linnaeus, he served as a demonstrator in botany at the Royal Åbo Academy (Regia Academia Aboensis). He was ennobled in 1816.

== Life ==
Carl Niclas Hellenius was born in Kärkölä where his father Carl Hellenius (1701–1762) was in the infantry, married to Brita Katarina Strandén (1712–1780). His paternal grandfather had moved from Sweden to Finland in the 17th century. He went to a secondary school in Åbo and studied at the Royal Academy of Turku from 1764 to 1769. He studied natural sciences and medicine under Pehr Kalm and economics and natural history under Pehr Adrian Gadd. His master's degree in 1769 under Gadd was on insects harmful to fish. He was named docent in chemistry, zoology and economics in 1773. Inspired by medicine professor Johan Johansson Haartman (1725–1787), he went to Uppsala University in 1774 to study medicine and received a doctoral degree in medicine there in 1776. He attended lectures from Carl von Linne, Adolph Murray, and Jonas Sidren. He wrote a dissertation under Linnaeus titled De Hypericum (1776) in which he described the species Hypericum guineense and H. mexicanum apart from describing several other species in the genus. Between 1777 and 1780 he worked as a medical doctor at Serafimerlasarettet, Sweden's first modern hospital, in Stockholm. He received his doctor of medicine degree from Uppsala in 1780. He subsequently returned to Finland and Turku. He worked for a while as a tutor in the Selkee estate of Major General Carl Constantin de Carnall. He became a demonstrator in botany at the Åbo Akademi in 1778. He became a professor extraordinary in 1780 and a full professor from 1793 until his retirement in 1816. He remained active at the academy in the city for the remainder of his life. He was responsible for the botanical garden and increased the number of plants in its collections from a couple of hundred to over two thousand species. He guided 31 doctoral dissertation including one by student Johan Gustav Justander who studied the phenology of flowering plants in Turku. He was ennobled in 1816 and took the name von Hellens.

Hellenius married Anna Charlotta von Mell (1763–1795), daughter of apothecary Lars Henrik von Mellin. They had six children. Another daughter of Lars Henrik von Mellin was married to Gabriel Erik Haartman (1757–1815) who was a professor of anatomy at the Åbo Akademi.

The botanical genus Costus was formerly known as Hellenia after Carl Niclas von Hellens. Carl Reinhold Sahlberg, one of his students, dedicated to him the heteropteran species Sigara hellensii (C.R. Sahlberg, 1819) (Hemiptera, Corixidae) (under basionym Corixa hellensii). He died in Turku, aged 74.
