= Olli Lounasmaa =

Finnish physicist and neuroscientist (1930–2002)

Olli Viktor Lounasmaa
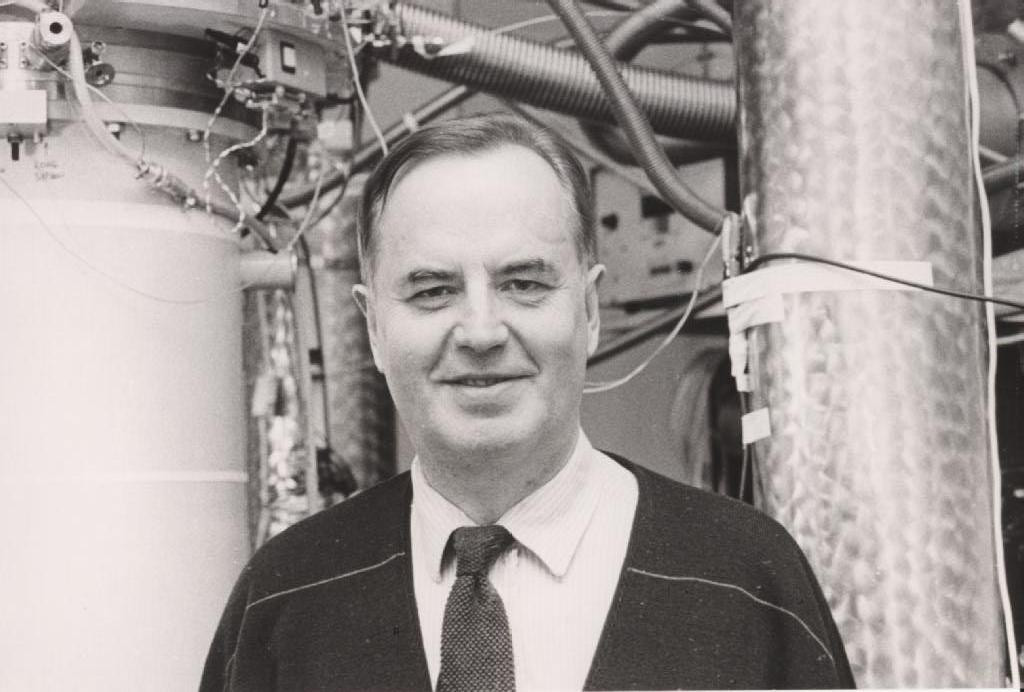
- Born: 20 August 1930; Turku, Finland
- Died: 27 December 2002 (aged 72); Goa, India
- Education: University of Helsinki; University of Oxford
- Known for: Low temperature physics Magnetoencephalography
- Children: Marja Lounasmaa, Kiti Müller
- Scientific career
- Fields: Physicist
- Workplaces: Helsinki University of Technology

Olli Viktor Lounasmaa (20 August 1930 – 27 December 2002) was a Finnish academician, experimental physicist and neuroscientist. He was known for his research in low temperature physics, especially for experimental proof of the superfluidity of helium-3 and also for his work in the field of magnetoencephalography.

== Life and work ==
Olli Viktor Lounasmaa graduated from the University of Helsinki in 1953. After a short period as senior assistant at the University of Turku, he went on to continue his studies in the Clarendon Laboratory of the University of Oxford, where he received his D.Phil. on low temperature physics in 1957. Lounasmaa worked as a visiting scientist at the Argonne National Laboratory in the United States from 1960 to 1964 before he was invited to the position of professor of engineering physics at the Helsinki University of Technology in 1964.

In 1965, Lounasmaa founded the Low Temperature Laboratory at the Helsinki University of Technology (since 2010, part of Aalto University) which he led up to his retirement in 1995. Under Lounasmaa's leadership, the laboratory produced one of the first experimental proofs for the superfluidity of helium-3. For this, Lounasmaa's team received a special mention from the Nobel Prize committee when the 1996 Nobel Prize in Physics was awarded to David M. Lee, Douglas D. Osheroff and Robert C. Richardson for their discovery of helium-3 superfluidity. His other major areas of work were superfluid He-3 in rotation, nuclear magnetism and the applications of superconductors.

In the early 1980s, Lounasmaa decided to start a new field of study and use his laboratory's experience in magnetometry to study magnetic fields created by brain activity. He and his students played a key role in the development of the theory and technology for magnetoencephalography (MEG), opening new ways to study the brain. He also co-founded the spinoff companies SHE (in the early 1970s, later Biomagnetic Technologies, inc., then 4-D Neuroimaging) and Neuromag (in 1989, now part of Elekta).

Lounasmaa led the MEG group until his retirement in 1996 (the MEG group was subsequently renamed "Brain Research Unit", to be led by the newly named professor, Dr. Riitta Hari, MD). With his early MEG students and postdocs (Matti Hämäläinen, Riitta Hari, Risto Ilmoniemi, and Jukka Knuutila), he published the highly cited and influential paper “Magnetoencephalography—theory, instrumentation, and applications to noninvasive studies of the working human brain” (Rev. Mod. Phys., Vol. 65, pp. 413–497 [1993]).

Lounasmaa died on 27 December 2002 in Goa, India during a holiday trip. The official cause of death was drowning, which according to his posthumously released memoirs was believed to have been caused by a cardiac arrest. On 1 January 2012 the Low Temperature Laboratory at Aalto University was renamed the O. V. Lounasmaa Laboratory in honor of its founder and longtime director.

== Awards ==
Olli Lounasmaa was awarded among others the Fritz London Memorial Prize (in 1984), the Research Prize of the Alexander von Humboldt Foundation (in 1993). In 1994 he became the first to be awarded with the Kapitsa Gold Medal of the Russian Academy of Sciences. In 1997, Lounasmaa was appointed Academician by the Academy of Finland. He was also a member of the United States National Academy of Sciences and a foreign member of the Royal Swedish Academy of Sciences.
