= Eva-Mari Aro =

Finnish biologist (born 1950)

- Born: 1950 (age 75–76)
- Awards: Foreign Associate of the National Academy of Sciences (2018)
- Scientific career
- Institutions: University of Turku
- Website: www.utu.fi/en/people/eva-mari-aro

Eva-Mari Aro (born 1950) is a Finnish biologist and professor of plant molecular biology at the University of Turku, Finland. Her research has focused on the function, regulation, damage, repair, and evolution of the machinery of photosynthesis, with applications in renewable energy. She was elected to the Finnish Academy of Science and Letters in 2001 and was elected a foreign associate of the National Academy of Sciences in 2018. In 2023, she was elected as a foreign member of the Royal Society of London

== Education ==
Aro received a master's degree from the University of Turku in 1975. She received her doctorate in 1982 after successfully defending her dissertation on "the relationship between the structure and function of plant photosynthesis and the adaptation of photosynthesis to natural environmental conditions."

== Career and research ==
In 1987, Aro was appointed Assistant Professor of Plant Physiology in the department of Biology at the University of Turku. She became Full Professor of Plant Molecular Biology in the Department of Biochemistry in 1998.

Aro served as an Academy Professor at the Academy of Finland (1998–2008). She was elected chairman of the International Society for Photosynthesis Research in 2004 and appointed vice-president of the European Academies Science Advisory Council (EASAC) for the period 2017–2019. Aro also served on the Editorial Board of Journal of the Royal Society Interface (2012–2015).

Aro directed the Academy of Finland's Center of Excellence in Integrated Photosynthesis and Metabolism Research for the period 2008–2013. In 2014, she became director of the Finnish Centre of Excellence in Molecular Biology of Primary Producers, which was selected by the Australian Research Council (ARC) to partner with other Plant Energy Biology research centers for the period 2014–2019. Her contributions to the project include the elucidation of photodamage and photoinhibition mechanisms. In 2017, Aro became a leader of NordAqua, a Nordic Centre of Excellence funded by NordForsk to develop bioeconomy knowledge and technologies for the period 2017–2022.

Aro's research interests lie primarily in the regulation of photosynthesis, the process by which primary producers such as plants convert an abiotic energy source such as light into organic compounds. Her lab studies the evolution of thylakoid light harvesting by photosystem membrane complexes in model organisms such as cyanobacteria, Chlamydomonas reinhardtii, diatoms, Physcomitrella patens, ferns, Arabidopsis thaliana, and spruce. Her applied research interests lie in renewable energy. The Aro lab utilizes synthetic biology principles to design and engineer systems for the production of biofuels.

=== Awards and honors ===
Aro has received several awards for her individual research contributions as well as her international collaborations:

- Member, Finnish Academy of Science and Letters (2001)
- Honorary Doctor, Umeå University (2012)
- Professor of the Year, University of Turku (2013)
- Academician, awarded by the President of Finland (2017)
- Academy Award, Finnish Academy of Science and Letters (2018)
- Foreign Associate, National Academy of Sciences (2018)
- Member, Academia Europaea (2021)
- Lifelong research achievement, awarded by the International Society of Photosynthesis Research (2022)
- Foreign member of the Royal Society of London (2023)
