= Uunio Saalas =

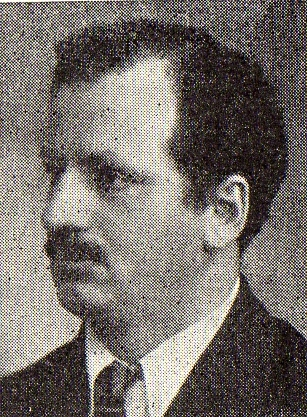

Uunio Saalas born Sahlberg (18 February 1882 – 3 April 1969) was a Finnish entomologist and a professor of agriculture and forest zoology at the University of Helsinki (1925-1952). He specialised in the beetles of the forests, particularly the Scolytidae. He was the author of several textbooks.

Saalas was born in the Sahlberg family, his father was Johan Reinhold Sahlberg, his paternal uncle was Carl Reinhold Sahlberg, and his paternal grandfather was Reinhold Ferdinand Sahlberg. After high school, he studied philosophy and graduated in 1908. He changed his name from Unio to Uunio and his surname to Saalas in 1906. He received a doctorate in 1919 with a dissertation on the bark beetles of Finland. He worked at the insect museum of the University of Helsinki and began to teach from 1923. He became a professor of agricultural and forest zoology in 1925. He was a founder of the Finnish Entomological Society in 1917 and edited the journal of the Finnish Entomological Society, Suomen Hyönteistieteellinen Aikaknusklrja, Annales Entomologici Fennici.
