= Journal of Low Temperature Physics =

- Discipline: Physics
- Language: English
- Edited by: Neil Sullivan, Jukka Pekola

Publication details
- History: 1969-present
- Publisher: Springer Science+Business Media
- Frequency: Biweekly
- Impact factor: 1.57 (2020)

Standard abbreviations
- ISO 4: J. Low Temp. Phys.

Indexing
- CODEN: JLTPAC
- ISSN: 0022-2291 (print); 1573-7357 (web)
- LCCN: 77005769
- OCLC no.: 844607

Links
- Journal homepage

The Journal of Low Temperature Physics is a biweekly peer-reviewed scientific journal covering the field of low temperature physics and cryogenics, including superconductivity, superfluidity, matter waves, magnetism and electronic properties, active areas in condensed matter physics, and low temperature technology. Occasionally, special issues dedicated to a particular topic are also published. According to the Journal Citation Reports, the journal has a 2020 impact factor of 1.57. The journal was established by John G. Daunt in 1969, and the current Editors-in-Chief are Neil S. Sullivan and Jukka Pekola. Paul Leiderer served as an Editor-in-Chief between 2012 and 2024.

== Abstracting and indexing ==
The journal is abstracted and indexed in Chemical Abstracts Service, Science Citation Index, and Scopus.
