= Novel world method =

Technique used in animal experiments

The novel world method is a technique used in animal behaviour experiments that address questions on the evolution of warning signals (e.g. conspicuous colour patterns such as yellow and black stripes) that chemically defended prey (e.g. toxic insects) use to deter predators (i.e. aposematism), and also on warning signal mimicry.

In the novel world, great tits (Parus major) are presented with a foraging task: they search and eat artificial prey in an indoor aviary built in a laboratory. The prey items are pieces of almond in paper shells that typically bear a black-and-white symbol as a signal (designed by the researcher) instead of a colour pattern. The prey are also presented on a black-and-white background. Novel world studies are “theoretical experiments” where for example the defence efficacy (bad taste), relative and absolute abundance, visibility or the degree of signal similarity of different prey types is manipulated, and the number of bird attacks on each prey type is recorded. Typical experiments test hypotheses on how predators learn through trial and error to avoid unpalatable prey, which prey traits facilitate avoidance learning and how those could in turn affect mortality of the prey types and therefore the evolution of their warning signals (see e.g. ).

The novel world was first developed by professor Rauno Alatalo and professor Johanna Mappes to circumvent the methodological problem that predators such as adult birds may possess learned information about prey colours, and juvenile birds may also have genetically transmitted knowledge: bird species can, for instance, have innate tendencies to avoid certain colours. By bringing the predator into a novel environment where its knowledge about prey appearance had been nullified, the researchers aimed at a better understanding of the selection pressures that the first warning signals emerging in a prey population could have faced.

By 2012, twenty articles based on novel world experiments had been published in scientific journals.
