= Academy professor =

Academic title awarded by academies of sciences

Leonhard Euler Math. Sublim. Professor. diploma. Signed by Johann Albrecht Korff

An academy professor is a scientist appointed to function as a professor and/or conferred the official professor rank by a national academy of sciences, rather than by a university.

Such scientists are often regarded as exceeding ordinary university professors in terms of research qualifications, and are typically elected on a competitive basis. Academy professors are usually employed by research institutions where their positions are based. This title exists in countries such as Finland, Russia, and Kazakhstan. Some academies, such as the Chinese Academy of Sciences, also award honorary titles of academy professor.

== Finland ==
In Finland, academy professors (Finnish: Akatemiaprofessori) are appointed by the Academy of Finland (Finnish: Suomen Akatemia). There are approximately 25 scientists holding this position at any given time.

Academy professors work in various fields, for example ecologist Johanna Mappes and computational nanoscience specialist Hannu Häkkinen. Their term typically lasts five years.

To be considered for the position, applicants must demonstrate significant research achievements and be recognised contributors within their fields. The role involves full-time research, including leading research projects, supervising teams, mentoring junior researchers, and participating in teaching and thesis supervision.

== Russia ==
Two Russian national academies—the Russian Academy of Sciences (RAS, Russian: Российская академия наук, РАН) and the Russian Academy of Education (RAE, Russian: Российская академия образования, РАО)—award honorary professor titles to scientists, typically under the age of 50, based on their scientific achievements.

These titles include "RAS Professor" (Russian: Профессор РАН), with 797 holders as of 2025, and "RAE Professor" (Russian: Профессор РАО). Some RAS Professors are later elected as full members of the Academy.

In addition to their institutional roles, these professors contribute to science policy and strategic planning in Russia and are considered potential candidates for full academy membership.

Professor titles are also awarded by some non-state academies, such as the Russian Academy of Natural Sciences.

== Other countries ==
In Kazakhstan, some public and private academies confer professor titles. There is also a position called "academical professor", which is equivalent to a standard university professorship and is not directly related to academies of sciences.

The Chinese Academy of Sciences awards honorary titles such as Einstein Professor to distinguished foreign scientists.

China also has the University of Chinese Academy of Sciences (Chinese: 中国科学院大学), whose faculty includes many members of the Academy who are sometimes informally referred to as "Professors of the Academy".
