= Stig Stenholm =

Finnish physicist (died 30 September 2017)

Stig Torsten Stenholm (26 February 1939 – 30 September 2017) was a theoretical physicist who formerly held an Academy of Finland professorship.

== Education and career ==
Stenholm obtained an engineering degree at the Helsinki University of Technology (HUT), and a master of science degree in mathematics at the University of Helsinki, both in 1964. He then earned his Dr. phil. at Oxford in 1967 on the topic of quantum liquids under supervision of Dirk ter Haar.

From 1967 to 1968, he performed postdoctorate work at Yale University. He obtained his a position as professor at the University of Helsinki in 1974. In 1980, Stenholm was appointed as the scientific director of the Research Institute for Theoretical Physics (TFT). His colleague Kalle-Antti Suominen later affirmed: "As a director Stig was very broad-minded and without this the happy atmosphere of TFT could not have existed."

In the 1990s, the TFT was replaced, and the Helsinki Institute of Physics (HIP) took its place. In 1997, Stenholm moved to the Royal Institute of Technology in Stockholm, Sweden. He retired in 2005.

He delivered the presentation speech for the 2005 Nobel Prize in Physics at the Stockholm Concert Hall.

== Work ==
Stenholm specialised on quantum optics and worked among other topics on laser cooling, Bose–Einstein condensation and quantum information.

== Honors ==
He received an Academy of Finland professorship for the work he performed from 1992 to 1997, and he was member of the Royal Swedish Academy of Sciences, the Austrian Academy of Sciences, the Finnish Society of Sciences and Letters and the Swedish Academy of Engineering Sciences in Finland.

== Books ==
- Stenholm, Stig: The Quest for Reality. Bohr and Wittgenstein – two complementary views. Oxford University Press. 2011. ISBN 978-0-19960-358-9 (abstract)
- Stenholm, Stig & Suominen, Kalle-Antti: Quantum Approach to Informatics. Wiley, 2005. ISBN 0-471-73610-4
- Stenholm, Stig: The Foundations of Laser Spectroscopy. Wiley / Dover Books on Physics, 1984. ISBN 0-486-44498-8
- Stenholm, Stig: The semiclassical theory of the gas laser. Pergamon Press, 1971. ISBN 0-08-016409-9
