= Lassi Päivärinta =

Finnish mathematician

Lassi Päivärinta is a Finnish mathematician, one-time professor of applied mathematics at the department of mathematics and statistics at the University of Helsinki. Päivärinta's research is mostly in the fields of inverse problems and partial differential equations.

== Education and career ==
Päivärinta received an MSc in mathematics at the University of Helsinki in 1976, and a PhD in mathematics in 1980. He has spent several periods at the University of Delaware and Washington University in St. Louis as visiting and adjunct professor. He became professor of mathematics at the University of Oulu in 1992, and started his professorship at the University of Helsinki in 2003. He was the leader of the Finnish Centre of Excellence in Inverse Problems Research and the director of the Rolf Nevanlinna Institute and the section of applied mathematics at the University of Helsinki. He is the editor-in-chief of the journal Inverse Problem and Imaging.

Päivärinta was awarded the Magnus Ehrnrooth Foundation Prize in mathematics by the Finnish Society of Sciences and Letters in 2006. He is a member of the Finnish Academy of Sciences.

In 2011, Päivärinta was awarded one of the ERC Advanced Grants 2010 of the European Research Council for mathematical research in inverse problems.

== Research ==
Since the late 1980s, inverse problems have attracted rapidly growing research interest, mostly in applied but also in pure mathematics. Päivärinta is one of the leading figures in this development from an early stage, and his research interests range from mathematical theory to practical applications. An example of this is Alberto Calderon's inverse problem, studied by several mathematicians and solved in the plane by Astala and Päivärinta. The problem has immediate application in electrical impedance tomography (EIT), a means of imaging the interior of the human body. In addition to his theoretical work, Päivärinta has worked on several similar topics related with biomedical and industrial imaging. He is a founding member of the Finnish Inverse Problems Society, the world's first scientific society for inverse problems.
