= Emilia Kilpua =

Finnish space scientist

- Born: Emilia Katja Johanna Huttunen; 18 November 1977 (age 48); Oulu, Finland
- Education: University of Helsinki (PhD)
- Awards: Väisälä Prize; 2021
- Scientific career
- Fields: Space science; Space weather
- Workplaces: University of Helsinki
- Thesis: Interplanetary shocks, magnetic clouds and magnetospheric storms (2005)
- Doctoral advisor: Hannu E. J. Koskinen

Emilia Kilpua (born November 18, 1977, in Oulu) is a Finnish space scientist. She is currently Professor of Space Physics at the University of Helsinki.

== Background and career ==
Kilpua was born and raised in Oulu, northern Finland, where auroras are commonplace in winter. She studied theoretical physics and mathematics at the University of Helsinki, followed by a Master's degree and PhD, with a thesis titled Interplanetary shocks, magnetic clouds and magnetospheric storms, which she completed in 2005. She undertook a postdoctoral research associate post in the Space Sciences Laboratory at UC Berkeley for three years. She moved back to Finland in 2008.

== Scientific interests ==
Kilpua's primary research focus is space weather, particularly with an eye to improving forecasting. She has made advances in our understanding of the formation and propagation of coronal mass ejections to Earth, as well as the response of the magnetospheric system, particularly the Earth's radiation belts. Since 2021, she has been a coordinator of the H2020 Marie Skłodowska-Curie Innovative Training Network SWATNet to train early career scientists in the field of heliosphysics and space weather.

== Awards and honours ==
- 2022: Associate editor for Astrophysics and Space Science
- 2021: Väisälä Prize of the Finnish Academy of Sciences
- 2020: Member of Finnish Academy of Letters and Sciences
- 2020: Member of Finnish Space Situational Awareness working team
- 2019: 2021 President of Board of The Finnish Physical Society
- 2017: Member of Scientific Committee on Solar-Terrestrial Physics (SCOSTEP)
- 2017: Awarded a European Research Council Consolidator Grant
- 2017: 2021 Member of Board of Solar Physics Division - European Physical Society
- 2016: 2019 Vice president of Board of The Finnish Physical Society
- 2015: Co-Investigator for BebiColombo SIXS
