= Kapitsa =

Kapitsa may refer to:

- Andrey Kapitsa (1931–2011), Soviet geographer and Antarctic explorer, discoverer of Lake Vostok
- Pyotr Kapitsa (1894–1984), Soviet physicist, Nobel prize winner
- Sergey Kapitsa (1928–2012), Soviet physicist
- 3437 Kapitsa (1982 UZ5) - main-belt asteroid discovered in 1982 by L. G. Karachkina, named after Pyotr Kapitsa

== See also ==
- Kapitsa–Dirac effect
