= Research Council of Finland =

Governmental funding body for scientific research

- Finnish: Suomen Akatemia; Swedish: Finlands Akademi
- Formation: 1948
- Location: Helsinki
- Owner: Finnish Ministry of Education, Science and Culture
- Website: aka.fi
- Formerly called: Academy of Finland

The Research Council of Finland (Finnish: Suomen Akatemia, Swedish: Finlands Akademi) is a governmental funding body for scientific research in Finland. Until August 2023, its official English-language name was Academy of Finland. It is based in Helsinki. Yearly, the council administers over €260 million to Finnish research activities. Over 5000 researchers are working on projects supported by the council.

The Research Council of Finland should not be confused with The Finnish Academy of Science and Letters (Suomalainen tiedeakatemia) and the Finnish Society of Science and Letters (Finska Vetenskaps-Societeten) which are the two Finnish learned societies for scientists and scholars. For engineers, there are two language-based honorary academies, the Finnish Academy of Technology (Teknillisten Tieteiden Akatemia) and the Swedish Academy of Engineering Sciences in Finland (Svenska tekniska veteskapsakademien i Finland).

The Finnish title of Academician (akateemikko / akademiker) is an award given by the President of Finland upon the recommendation of the Research Council to the most distinguished Finnish scientists, scholars and artists. It may also be bestowed on foreign scientists, scholars or artists who have contributed very significantly to Finnish intellectual life. At any time, there may be a maximum of 12 living scientific and scholarly academicians and eight living artistic academicians. The number of foreign academicians is not limited. The Academicians do not have any organizational connection to the Academy of Finland, although this was the requisite for membership in 1947–1969. Personnel funded by the Research Council can use the title referring to it, e.g. distinguished professors funded by the council are called Academy Professors. The funding period for Academy professors is 5 years.

== Academy Professors ==
=== Terms ===
The Academy of Finland appoints Academy Professors. The term is five years. There are 32 serving currently, with two carrying specific name and branch. Minna Canth Academy Professor focuses on Social equality and Women's studies. Martti Ahtisaari Academy Professor focuses on International Conflict management.

=== Currently serving ===
Academy Professors in spring 2018:

- Pertti Alasuutari
- Kari Alitalo
- Paavo Alku
- Eva-Mari Aro
- Eero Castrén
- Sara Heinämaa
- Hannu Häkkinen
- Elina Ikonen

- Johanna Ivaska
- Sirpa Jalkanen
- Jukka Jernvall
- Kai Kaila
- Samuel Kaski
- Matti Keloharju
- Jan Klabbers
- Markku Kulmala

- Riitta Lahesmaa
- Matti Lassas
- Matti Latva-Aho
- Virpi Lummaa
- Johanna Niemi
- Jukka Pekola
- Markku Peltonen
- Asla Pitkänen

- Craig Primmer
- Katri Räikkönen-Talvitie
- Hannu Salmi
- Petri Toiviainen
- Päivi Törmä
- Anu Wartiovaara
- Timo Vesala
- Seppo Ylä-Herttuala

== See also ==
- Tekes
- SITRA
