= Journal of Aerosol Science =

- Discipline: Chemistry, engineering, physics
- Language: English
- Edited by: Pratim Biswas, Mansoo Choi, Alfred Weber

Publication details
- History: 1970-present
- Publisher: Elsevier
- Frequency: 13/year
- Impact factor: 4.586 (2021)

Standard abbreviations
- ISO 4: J. Aerosol Sci.

Indexing
- ISSN: 0021-8502
- LCCN: 78017622
- OCLC no.: 01800058

Links
- Journal homepage; Online archive

The Journal of Aerosol Science is a peer-reviewed academic journal covering the study of aerosols in multiple disciplines, including physics, chemistry, and engineering. It was established in 1970 and is published thirteen times per year. It is published by Elsevier in association with the European Aerosol Assembly. The editors-in-chief are Christopher J Hogan (University of Minnesota, Twin Cities, Minneapolis) and Min Hu (Peking University, Beijing). According to the Journal Citation Reports, the journal has a 2021 impact factor of 4.586.
