= Hannu Häkkinen =

Hannu Häkkinen (born 1962) is a Finnish physicist and professor of computational nanoscience at the University of Jyväskylä.

== Education and career ==
Hannu Häkkinen studied physics at the University of Jyväskylä and received his master's degree in 1988. He earned his doctorate in 1991. Emil Aaltonen Foundation granted him the Young Researcher Award from his doctoral dissertation (Effective Medium Studies of Dislocations and Surfaces in FCC Metal).

Häkkinen started his scientific career at the faculty of University of Jyväskylä. He has held there several teaching and research posts from 1987. After his graduation, Häkkinen worked as a post-doctoral fellow at the Georgia Institute of Technology, Atlanta from November 1992 to August 1994. Then he returned to Jyväskylä and worked as a senior teaching assistant at the university of Jyväskylä from 1994 to 1998. Between 1998 and 2003 he was again in the Georgia Institute of Technology, this time working as an academy researcher and a senior research scientist.

From 2007 Häkkinen has been a professor of computational nanoscience in the University of Jyväskylä. The professorship is a joint position in Physics and Chemistry Departments. He was nominated the scientific director of the Nanoscience Center in the University of Jyväskylä in 2012.

University of Jyväskylä is organizing the International Symposium on Small Particles and Inorganic Clusters (ISSPIC) in August 2016. Professor Häkkinen is the chairman of the conference.

From 2016 to 2020 he is working as an academy professor at the Academy of Finland. He was awarded the Theodor Homén Prize in 2008 by the Finnish Society of Sciences and Letters.

== Research ==
Professor Häkkinen's special interests as a scientist are nanoscience and nanotechnology. Most of his work is related to the different types of nano-structures. He has studied electronic, optical, magnetic, chemical and catalytic properties of bare, supported, and ligand-protected metal nanoparticles. He has also done research with carbon nanotubes and graphene.

Some of Häkkinen's work after 2010 was related to the structural and chemical properties of metal nanoparticle/bionanoparticle (virus) hybrids. Normally a virus is so small that observing it is quite impossible. Häkkinen developed a specific method in which he attached a self-made 1 to 3 nanometer sized gold particles onto the surface proteins of enteroviruses. The golden nanoparticles act as markers. After the operation the exact location of the viruses could be examined by electron beam imaging. The method made also possible to study the surface structure of the virus.

== Publications ==
Hannu Häkkinen has published (or has been a co-author in) nearly 200 scientific publications. Most of them have appeared in the notable series and journals of physics and chemistry (for example Journal of the American Chemical Society).
