= Finnish Academy of Science and Letters =

Coordinates: 60°10′11″N 024°57′25″E

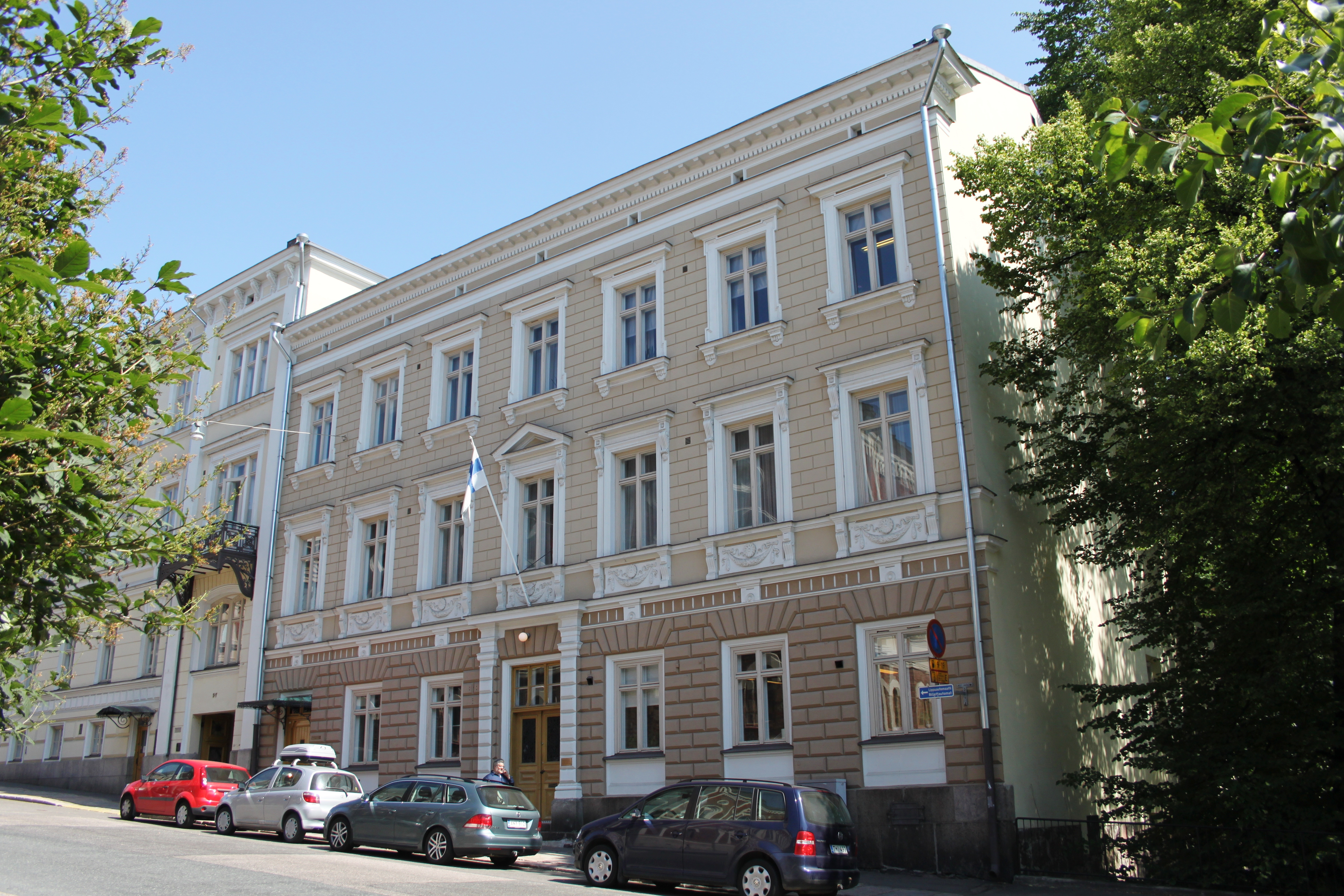

The Finnish Academy of Science and Letters (Finnish: Suomalainen Tiedeakatemia ry; Latin: Academia Scientiarum Fennica) is a Finnish learned society. It was founded in 1908 and is thus the second oldest academy in Finland. The oldest is the Finnish Society of Sciences and Letters, which was founded in 1838.

== Members ==
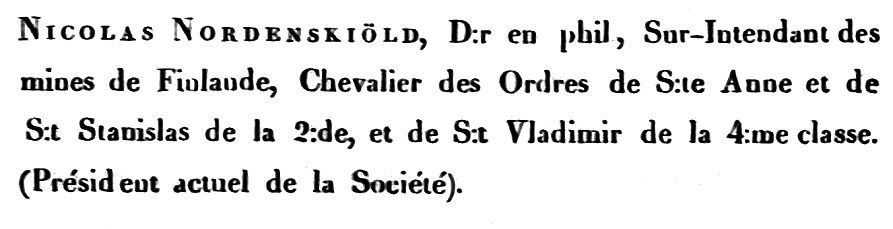
Nordenskiöld N.G. Acta Societatis Scientiarum Fennicae. 1842. T. 1. P. XIII

The academy has a total of 328 seats for Finnish members. When a member of the academy turns 65 years, his seat is free for selection of a new member, but he remains a full member until death. The seats are divided into two sections

=== Section of Science ===
- Mathematics and Computer Science 28 members
- Physics and Astronomy 26 members
- Geosciences 24 members
- Chemistry 21 members
- Biology 22 members
- Agriculture and Forestry 22 members
- Medicine 46 members

189 seats

=== Section of the Humanities ===
- Theology and Religion 11 members
- Philosophy and Aesthetics 12 members
- Psychology and Pedagogy 14 members
- History and Archaeology 17 members
- Finno-Ugric Studies 17 members
- Linguistics 21 members
- Jurisprudence 18 members
- Social sciences 29 members

139 seats

== Foreign members ==
Since 1924, foreign members have also been invited to the academy. A foreign scientist who has proven to be a leading researcher can be elected as a foreign member. The selection of foreign members follows the same strict principles as the selection of domestic members. Foreign members represent the best of science around the world.

== Prizes ==
=== Academy Award ===
The highest prize of the academy is the Academy Award, awarded to a distinguished member of the Academy in recognition of the scientific career. The prize has been awarded since 1945. As of 2023, the value of the prize is 30.000€. The recipients of the prize are:

- 2023: Lea Pulkkinen (psychology)
- 2022: Sirpa Jalkanen (immunology)
- 2021: Ilkka Niiniluoto (philosophy)
- 2020: Riitta Hari (neuroscience)
- 2019: Raimo Tuomela (philosophy)
- 2018: Eva-Mari Aro (biology)
- 2017: Marjatta Hietala (history)
- 2016: Markus Pessa (physics)
- 2015: Pertti Kansanen (education)
- 2014: Markku Leskelä (chemistry)
- 2013: Tapani Valkonen (sociology)
- 2012: Pekka Hautojärvi (physics)
- 2011: Risto Näätänen (psychology)
- 2010: Antti Vaheri (medicine)
- 2009: Heikki Ylikangas (history)
- 2008: Keijo Kajantie (physics)
- 2007: Matti Rissanen (English philology)
- 2006: Pentti Kauranen (chemistry)
- 2005: Antti Suviranta (jurisprudence)
- 2004: Jarmo Visakorpi (medicine)
- 2003: Aira Kemiläinen (history)
- 2002: Aarne Nyyssönen (forest mensuration and management planning)
- 2001: Pertti Pesonen (social science)
- 2000: Olli Martio (mathematics)
- 1999: Lauri Honko (folkloristics)
- 1998: Lauri Saxén (medicine)
- 1997: Päiviö Tommila (history)
- 1996: Olli Lehto (mathematics)
- 1995: Pertti Virtaranta (Finnish and Finno-Ugric languages)
- 1994: Jorma K. Miettinen (chemistry)
- 1993: Erik Allardt (sociology)
- 1992: Olavi Granö (geography)
- 1991: Eino Jutikkala (history)
- 1990: Jaakko Jalas (botany)
- 1989: Osmo Ikola (Finnish language)
- 1988: Pentti Laasonen (mathematics)
- 1987: Matti Kuusi (folklore)
- 1986: Osmo Järvi (medicine)
- 1985: Kauko Pirinen (church history)
- 1984: Sulo Toivonen (biology)
- 1983: Erkki Itkonen (Finno-Ugric studies)
- 1982: Peitsa Mikola (forest biology)
- 1981: Antti Sovijärvi (phonetics)
- 1980: Veikko Nurmikko (chemistry)
- 1979: Jaakko Suolahti (history)
- 1978: Erkki Saxén (pathology)
- 1977: Kustaa Vilkuna (ethnography)
- 1976: Thure Sahama (geochemistry)
- 1975: Veikko Väänänen (romance philology)
- 1974: Esko Suomalainen (genetics)
- 1973: Lauri Posti (Baltic-Finnish languages)
- 1972: Kustaa Inkeri (mathematics)
- 1971: Armas Salonen (Mesopotamian and Sumerian culture)
- 1970: Sulo Taavetti Kilpi (chemistry)
- 1969: Rafael Koskimies (literature)
- 1968: Viljo Kujala (botany)
- 1967: Brynolf Honkasalo (jurisprudence)
- 1966: Veikko Aleksanteri Heiskanen (geodesy)
- 1965: Arvi Korhonen (history)
- 1964: Yrjö Ilvessalo (forest mensuration planning)
- 1963: Pekka Katara (Germanic philology)
- 1962: Jaakko Keränen (research of magnetism)
- 1961: Toivo Itkonen (Sami language and culture studies)
- 1960: Paavo Suomalainen (zoology)
- 1959: Lauri Kettunen (Baltic-Finnish languages)
- 1958: Mauno Johannes Kotilainen (botany)
- 1957: Martti Räsänen (Turkic languages)
- 1956: Väinö Auer (geography)
- 1955: Aarne Henrik Maliniemi (history)
- 1954: Vilho Väisälä (meteorology)
- 1953: Antti Filemon Puukko (theology)
- 1953: Yrjö Reenpää (medicine)
- 1952: Martti Olavi Rapola (Finnish language)
- 1952: Uunio Saalas (entomology)
- 1951: Yrjö Väisälä (astronomy)
- 1951: Arthur Långfors (romance philology)
- 1950: Kaarle Jalmari Jaakkola (history)
- 1950: Toivo Henrik Järvi (biology)
- 1949: Viljo Tarkiainen (literature)
- 1949: Pekka Juhana Myrberg (mathematics)
- 1948: Johannes Gabriel Granö (geography)
- 1948: Aarne Elias Äyräpää (archeology)
- 1947: Gustaf John Ramstedt (Altaic languages)
- 1947: Ilmari Bonsdorff (geodesy)
- 1946: Uno Nils Oskar Harva (Finno-Ugric linguistics)
- 1946: Pentti Eelis Eskola (geology)
- 1945: Gustaf Komppa (chemistry)
- 1945: Aarne Michael Tallgren (archeology)

=== Väisälä Prize ===
The Väisälä Prize (Finnish: Väisälän palkinto) was established by the Finnish Academy of Sciences and Letters in cooperation with the Väisälä Foundation. The prize is awarded to outstanding scientists in the active parts of their careers in the fields of mathematics and natural sciences. The prize is awarded by the Board of the Finnish Academy of Science and Letters. The first prize was awarded in 2000 and has been awarded annually since then. The prize has been awarded to:

- 2023: Vesa Julin and Katrianne Lehtipalo
- 2022: Emilia Kilpua (physics) and Christian Webb (mathematics)
- 2021: Mikko Möttönen (physics) and Tuomas Orponen (mathematics)
- 2020: Goëry Genty (optics) and Tuomo Kuusi (mathematics)
- 2019: Tero Heikkilä (theoretical physics), Jani Lukkarinen (mathematical physics), and Otso Ovaskainen (mathematical ecology)
- 2018: Camilla Hollanti (mathematics) and Sabrina Maniscalco (quantum physics)
- 2017: Peter Liljeroth (physics), Kaisa Matomäki (mathematics), and Minna Palmroth (space science)
- 2016: Risto Korhonen (mathematics) and Mika Sillanpää (physics)
- 2015: Mikko Salo (mathematics) and Paul Greenlees (physics)
- 2014: Tuomas Hytönen (mathematics) and Tuukka Petäjä (physics)
- 2013: Marko Huhtanen (mathematics) and Sebastiaan van Dijken (physics)
- 2012: Xiao Zhong (mathematics) and Mika Valden (physics)
- 2011: Peter Hästö (mathematics) and Janne Ruokolainen (physics)
- 2010: Kaisa Miettinen (mathematics) and Adam Foster (physics)
- 2009: Eero Hyry (mathematics) and Edwin Kukk (experimental physics)
- 2008: Eero Saksman (mathematics) and Kari J. Eskola (physics)
- 2007: Jarkko Kari (mathematics) and Kari Rummukainen (physics)
- 2006: Juha Kinnunen (mathematics) and Kalle-Antti Suominen (physics)
- 2005: Matti Lassas (mathematics) and Martti Kauranen (physics)
- 2004: Jari Taskinen (mathematics), Päivi Törmä (physics), and Timo Vesala (meteorology)
- 2003: Tero Kilpeläinen (mathematics) and Keijo Hämäläinen (physics)
- 2002: Pekka Koskela (mathematics) and Erkki Thuneberg (physics)
- 2001: Erkki Somersalo (mathematics), Jari Turunen (physics), and Markku Lehtinen (geophysics)

== See also ==
- Category:Members of the Finnish Academy of Science and Letters
