= Virpi Lummaa =

Finnish evolutionary biologist

Virpi Lummaa is a Finnish evolutionary biologist and ecologist. She is an Academy of Finland professor at the University of Turku. Her research interests include ageing, lifespan, and natural selection in contemporary human populations. In addition to her research into human evolution, Lummaa studies life history patterns, social behavior, and more in Asian elephants, another large, long-lived mammal. Lummaa is currently the Principal Investigator of both the Human Life History Group based at the University of Turku and the Myanmar Timber Elephant Project. She has received a starting grant from the European Research Council.

== Human life history ==
Lummaa's research into the life history and evolution of contemporary humans has been widely covered by the press. Her work is largely based on a collection of digitized Finnish parish records which provide longitudinal demographic data spanning 350 years and 15 generations. Lummaa has used these data to investigate a variety of topics related to human survival, reproduction, and evolution in contemporary human populations. She has tested the popular "grandmother hypothesis" by evaluating the impact of a grandmother's presence on infant survival rates. Overall, her data support the claim that grandmothers can improve infant survival, but noted that there were exceptions. For example, simultaneous child bearing and raising by daughters-in-law and mothers-in-law actually decreased child survival rate. Lummaa has also studied the grandmother hypothesis in Asian elephants. In addition to testing the grandmother hypothesis, Lummaa has used this dataset to evaluate the impact of having a male twin on females. She found that females with a twin brother had reduced fertility, suggesting a prenatal effect on females with a twin brother. Lummaa has also studied the impact of stressful periods upon miscarriage rates. Interestingly, male fetuses were more likely to be miscarried during difficult times than female fetuses. This resulted in a skewed sex ratio in the population. Furthermore, Lummaa has used this dataset to investigate evolution in contemporary human populations.

== Myanmar Timber Elephant Project ==
Through the Myanmar Timber Elephant Project, Lummaa studies similar topics including health, survival and reproduction in Asian elephants. Lummaa argues that despite their appearance, the fact that elephants share long life spans, reproductive history, and family structure with humans makes them useful animals to study. She hopes that studying elephants can help scientists better understand ageing in humans. This work is based on a century's work of longitudinal demographic data as well as new data collected from live elephants. These robust datasets exist because captive elephants undergo rigorous health tests throughout their lives to ensure they are fit to work, thereby producing helpful datasets for scientists like Lummaa. Like her work on humans, Lummaa's research into Asian elephants has been covered in the press. Lummaa has found evidence that elephant grandmothers help care for calves in a role similar to that of human grandmothers. Additionally, the presence of a maternal sister improves chance of calf survival. Furthermore, her work has revealed that calves born to stressed mothers during harsh weather actually age faster than other calves. While the exact cause is unclear, Lummaa hopes findings like these can be applied to understand ageing in humans. In addition to the basic science aim of understanding life history of large, long-lived mammals such as humans and elephants, the Myanmar Timber Elephant Project hopes their research can guide elephant management and healthcare to improve the lives of captive and wild endangered elephants. Her research demonstrates that wild populations of Asian elephants are vulnerable to decline. She has expressed concern about captive elephant populations used in the timber industry and in tourism. Additionally, she is concerned about the impact these industries have on the wild populations from which the captive population is drawn.

== Selected publications ==
- Lahdenperä, Mirkka; Lummaa, Virpi; Helle, Samuli; Tremblay, Marc; Russell, Andrew F. (2004). "Fitness benefits of prolonged post-reproductive lifespan in women" (PDF). Nature. 428 (6979): 178–181. doi:10.1038/nature02367. PMID 15014499. S2CID 4415832.
- Lummaa, Virpi; Clutton-Brock, Tim (2002). "Early development, survival and reproduction in humans". Trends in Ecology & Evolution. 17 (3): 141–147. doi:10.1016/S0169-5347(01)02414-4.
- Alvergne, Alexandra; Lummaa, Virpi (2010). "Does the contraceptive pill alter mate choice in humans?". Trends in Ecology & Evolution. 25 (3): 171–179. doi:10.1016/j.tree.2009.08.003. PMID 19818527.
- Pettay, Jenni E.; Kruuk, Loeske E. B.; Jokela, Jukka; Lummaa, Virpi (2005). "Heritability and genetic constraints of life-history trait evolution in preindustrial humans". Proceedings of the National Academy of Sciences of the United States of America. 102 (8): 2838–2843. doi:10.1073/pnas.0406709102. PMC 549452. PMID 15701704.
- Maklakov, Alexei A.; Lummaa, Virpi (2013). "Evolution of sex differences in lifespan and aging: Causes and constraints". BioEssays. 35 (8): 717–724. doi:10.1002/bies.201300021. PMID 23733656. S2CID 13679515.
