= Johan Reinhold Sahlberg =

Finnish entomologist (1845–1920)

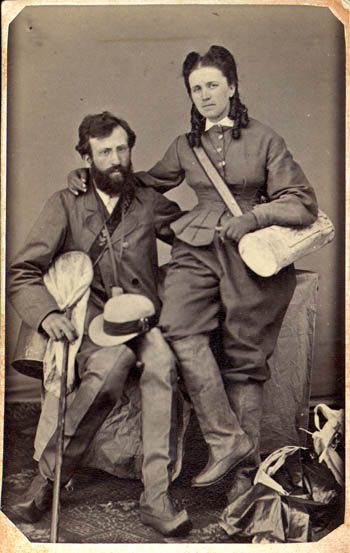
- Johan Reinhold and Mimmi Sahlberg
- Born: 6 June 1845; Helsinki
- Died: 8 May 1920 (aged 74); Helsinki
- Scientific career
- Fields: entomologist

Johan Reinhold Sahlberg (6 June 1845, Helsinki – 8 May 1920, Helsinki) was a Finnish entomologist.

Johan Reinhold Sahlberg was the son of Reinhold Ferdinand Sahlberg and grandson of Carl Reinhold Sahlberg. Both his father and grandfather were entomologists. He specialised in Coleoptera and Auchenorrhyncha. Johan Reinhold Sahlberg made expeditions to many parts of Finland, to (Russian) Karelia, Siberia, the Mediterranean area, and to Central Asia. His son Uunio Saalas also became an entomologist.

He wrote Ofversigt af Finlands och den Skandinaviska halfons Cicadariae I (Notiser ur Sallskapets pro Fauna et Flora Fennica Forhandlingar (n.s.) 9 (12): 1-506, pls. 1-2) and Coleoptera Mediterranea que in Aegypto, Palaestina, Syria, Caramania at que in Anatolia occidentali anno 1904. Öfversigt Finska Vetenskaps-Societetens. Förhandlingar, Helsingfors 55A (19): 1-281. 1913.
