= Eero Häkkinen =

Finnish politician

Eero Johannes Häkkinen (4 November 1911 – 19 August 1976) was a Finnish politician, born in Suonenjoki. He was a Member of the Parliament of Finland from 1966 to 1970, representing the Social Democratic Party of Finland (SDP).
