= Pasi Häkkinen =

Finnish ice hockey player

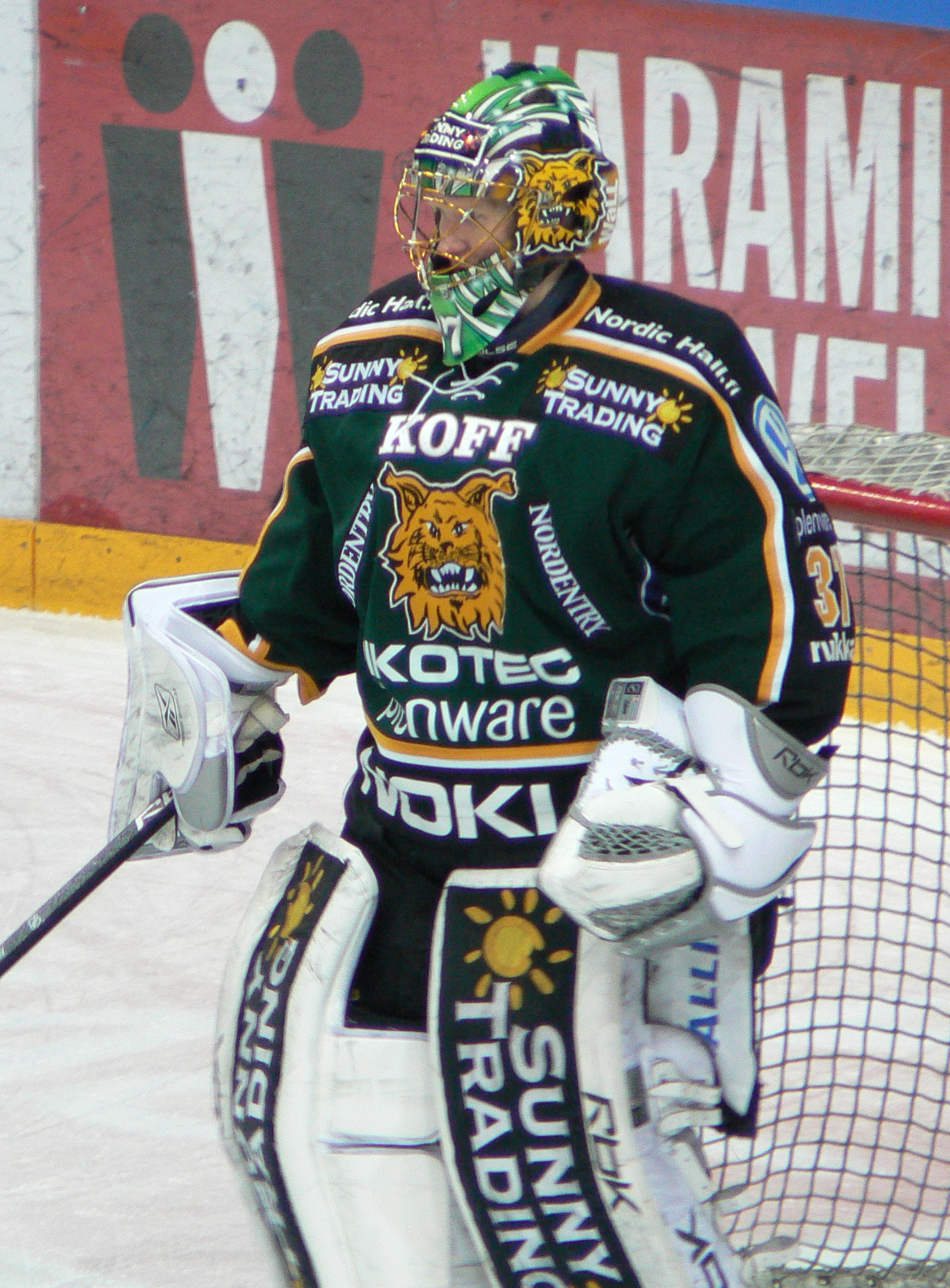
- Born: 25 June 1977 (age 48) Lappeenranta, FIN
- Height: 5 ft 10 in (178 cm)
- Weight: 181 lb (82 kg; 12 st 13 lb)
- Position: Goaltender
- Caught: Left
- Played for: SaiPa; Nottingham Panthers; Jokerit; Herning Blue Fox; Lukko; Ilves; HC Bolzano; SønderjyskE Ishockey
- Playing career: 1997–2015

Pasi Häkkinen (born 25 June 1977) is a Finnish former ice hockey goaltender.

== Career ==
Häkkinen started his pro career with SaiPa in the Finnish SM-liiga, and was the backup goalie for Jokerit for the 2004–2005 season, when he won the silver medal with the club. He was their #1 goaltender in the previous season, and has signed with a Danish team for the 2005–2006 season. Häkkinen has also spent a year with the Nottingham Panthers in the British league. In 2015, he became a coach of Hokki.

== Career statistics ==
=== Regular season ===
Season	Team	League	GP	W	L	T	MIN	GA	SO	GAA
1996-97	SaiPa	SM-liiga	--	--	--	--	--	--	--	--
1997-98	SaiPa	SM-liiga	--	--	--	--	--	--	--	--
1998-99	SaiPa	SM-liiga	--	--	--	--	--	--	--	--
1999-00	SaiPa	SM-liiga	--	--	--	--	--	--	--	--
2000-01	SaiPa	SM-liiga	--	--	--	--	--	--	--	--
2001-02	Nottingham Panthers	BISL	8	0	0	0	247	14	0	3.40
2003-04	Jokerit	SM-liiga	46	20	8	16	2713	101	5	2.23
2004-05	Jokerit	SM-liiga	2	0	0	2	119	7	0	3.52
