= Kalle-Antti Suominen =

Kalle-Antti Suominen (born 1964) is a Finnish physicist, professor of physics in the department of physics of University of Turku in Finland, vice-rector for research at the University of Turku, and chair of the physics and astronomy section of the Finnish Academy of Science and Letters.
