= Olavi Granö =

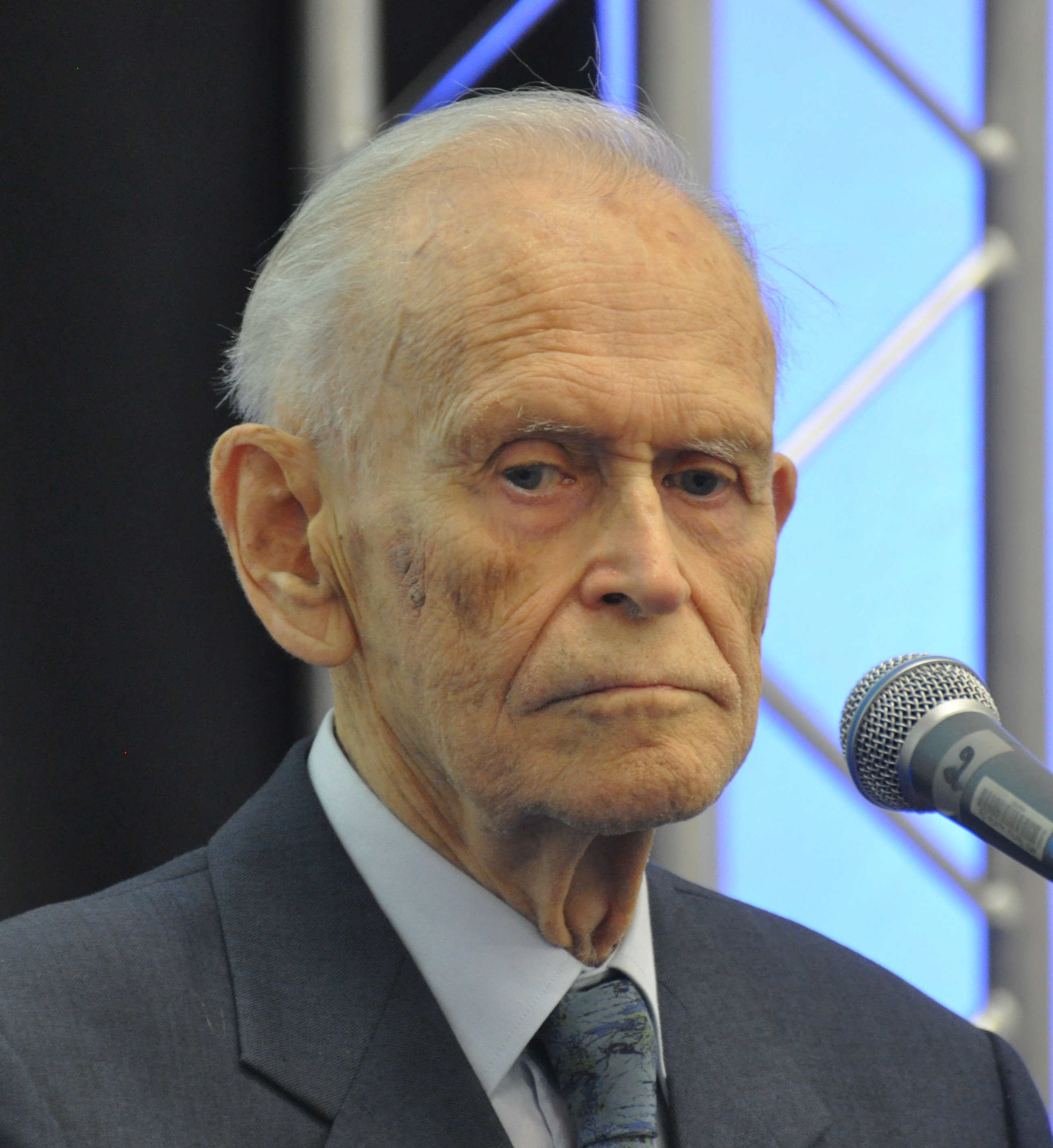
Olavi Granö in 2011

Olavi Granö (27 May 1925 – 19 April 2013) was a Finnish geographer.

In 1984–1994, he was the chancellor of University of Turku.

In 1989, he was elected a member of the Academia Europaea. In 2001, he was awarded with Order of the Cross of Terra Mariana, III class.
