= Johanna Ivaska =

Finnish cancer researcher

- Born: 1972 (age 53–54); Turku, Finland
- Parent: Ari Ivaska

Academic background
- Education: University of Turku

Academic work
- Discipline: Molecular cell biology
- Sub-discipline: Cancer research
- Institutions: University of Turku; VTT Technical Research Centre of Finland
- Website: www.ivaskalab.com

Mari Johanna Ivaska (born 1972) is a Finnish cancer researcher and molecular cell biology academy professor in University of Turku, Finland.

== Early life and education ==
Johanna Ivaska was born 1972 in Turku, Finland. Her father is emeritus analytical chemistry professor Ari Ivaska. She did her master's studies in University of Turku. Her PhD on collagen-binding integrins in University of Turku was give an honorary mention for an excellent PhD thesis by the Faculty of Medicine, University of Turku in 2001. After receiving a PhD she moved to London, UK for a postdoctoral work on investigating how integrins and protein kinases work together in cancer migration at Cancer Research UK with professor Peter J. Parker.

== Academic career and research ==
Ivaska established her lab in 2003 at VTT Technical Research Centre of Finland. Currently Ivaska Lab is situated in Turku Centre for Biotechnology. Ivaska's research concentrates on cell surface receptors called integrins and how these affect to cancer cell migration, invasion, tumour-stroma crosstalk and other processes that promote cancer progression. Research aims to find novel regulators for integrin activity, understanding the integrin traffic, and link between integrin activity regulation and mechanosensing. The group also does research on cellular machinery that facilitates cancer cell migration. In this, filopodia are important. Ivaska's group has discovered unconventional myosin that regulates filopodia formation, possibly providing a potential cancer therapeutic.

== Awards and honours ==
- The Ivaska group's publication in Nature Cell Biology won the Medix prize for the best national publication in medicine in 2017 and Elias Tillandz prize for best publication in Turku in 2017
- A.I. Virtanen prize, 2017
- Anders Jahre young investigator prize, 2011
- FEBS Anniversary prize in recognition of important achievement in the field of biochemistry, 2010
- L'Oreal-UNESCO for Women in Science award Finland, 2008
- Medix prize for the best scientific publication in Finland, 2008, 2012
- The Outstanding Young Persons of the World (TOYP) honouree
- European Molecular Biology Organisation Young investigator 2006
- Sigrid Juselius Young Investigator Prize, 2005

== Major grants ==
- European Research Council grants including an ERC Starting grant in 2008, ERC Consolidator grant in 2014 and Proof-of-concept grants in 2015 and 2018
- Roosa nauha (Pink ribbon) grants in 2013 and 2016

== Affiliations ==
- Editorial board member of Journal of Cell Biology, Cell Reports and Journal of Cell Science
- Member of the board, Instrumentariumin tiedesäätiö
- Member of European Molecular Biology Organisation

== Personal life ==
She is married to immunology professor Marko Salmi and they have twin girls (born 2005). Her hobbies include marathon running that she also does for charity, boating and outdoor life in the Archipelago Sea.
