= Paavo Suomalainen =

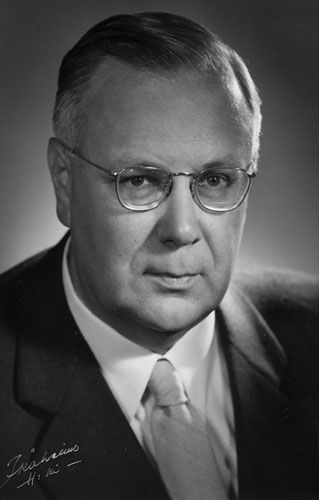

Paavo Suomalainen (28 October 1907 – 16 October 1976) was a Finnish zoologist who specialized in thermal physiology. He served as a professor of animal physiology at the department of zoology in the University of Helsinki and established a major project with his students to study the physiology and biochemistry of hibernation in the European hedgehog.

== Life and work ==
Suomalainen was born in Helsinki to university chancellor Kustaa Vihtori and Aleksandra (Sanni) Vilhelmiina Lähde. He became interested in biology at an early age thanks to his teacher Emil Kivirikko at the Finnish Normal Lyceum. He received his master's degree in 1930 and a PhD in 1936. He taught at the university as an assistant and became an associate professor in 1938 and was a professor from 1940 until his death. He married Alma Valborg (Vappu) Löppönen in 1940. From the late 1930s he began to study hibernation, with the hedgehog as his model animal with his laboratory getting nicknamed as the "Hedgehog Palace". Thanks to the body of work, the second International Congress on Hibernation was held in Helsinki in 1962. He studied temperature regulation, and physiology, teaching and influencing a number of students. Five doctorates on hibernation were produced by his students. He discovered that injection of magnesium chloride and insulin could induce hibernation in hedgehogs and they could be brought out of that state with calcium chloride injections. He co-authored a textbook on zoology teaching Eläinoppi oppikouluja värten (Zoology for the teaching works) which went into eighteen editions from 1948 to 1974. He also took an interest in photography, nature and birds and published a book along with his brother, the genetics professor Esko Suomalainen on the Suomen erämaiden käustä (The beauty of the Finnish wastelands) in 1938 and another book on nature in 1952.
