= ISSPIC =

ISSPIC, the International Symposium on Small Particles and Inorganic Clusters, is an established biennial conference series on fundamental science of finite size effects and the possibility of controlling the properties of material at the nanometer scale, organized since 1976. The conference topics typically include atomic and molecular clusters and their assemblies, supported and free-standing nanostructures and particles, and other nanometer-scale systems.

== History and development ==
The first ISSPIC conference was held in 1976 in Lyon. The idea to organize an international meeting of scientists who research the nanomolecular and atomic structures was given by pioneers in nanophysics such as Jean Farges, Jacques Friedel, Walter Knight, Ryogo Kubo, and Bernhard Mühlschlegel. Friedel was also the chairman of the first conference.

The main theme of the first couple of ISSPIC symposiums was fundamental studies on the finite-size effects of atomic and molecular clusters. The discussion emphasized the physical aspects. At the beginning, the conference was organized every fourth year but since 1988 it was held every two years. The conference has become a fundamental event on the area of the nanoscience and the research of nanoclusters during the last decades.

The ISSPIC XX scheduled for 2020 unfortunately had to be cancelled because of the COVID 19 pandemic situation. However, the succeeding ISSPIC XXI has already been announced to take place in Berlin, Germany in 2023.

== Conference topics ==
The objective of the conference is to be an interdisciplinary forum for presentation and discussion of fundamental and technological developments in the research fields involving finite size effects of materials at the nanometer scale.

The studies discussed at the conference comprise the structure and thermodynamics of nanoparticle systems, their electronic structure and quantum effects, spectroscopy and dynamics, reactivity and catalysis, correlated electrons, magnetism, superconductivity, optical properties and plasmonics, carbon nanomaterials, biotechnological and medical applications, environmental science, devices and applications, energy applications, and many more.

The symposia aim to provide an overview of new results, emerging trends, and perspectives in the science of atomic and molecular clusters, nanoparticles, and nanostructures. In addition, the interdisciplinary approach has proven to stimulate the emergence of new research topics, enabling innovative applications of nanoscience.

On 12 September 1990 during the 5th ISSPIC which was held in Konstanz, Germany, Wolfgang Krätschmer presented a report on the large-scale production of C_{60} (fullerenes) at the scheduled talk of Richard Smalley. This discovery caused a huge growth in materials science of nanocarbons. It also revealed the essential role of chemistry in the use of molecular clusters as a functional unit of the new materials.

A great part of the latest research results which were introduced in the conference in Fukuoka, Japan in 2014 were related to gold and silver nanoparticles. The research has mainly focused on the metallic nanostructures at this time. One of the growing research interests has been the ligand-protected metallic clusters. In addition to gold and silver, other metals such as platinum, palladium, copper, nickel, zirconium and niobium were used in the experiments and also metalloid materials like silicon. Other issues were different type of molecular structures and magnetic, optical, chemical, and thermal properties of those structures.

Researchers in the ISSPIC community have been working on nanoscience long before the term became as popular as it is today. From its start, one central theme in the field has been to try to understand how matter organizes itself from the atomic and molecular dimensions to nanoparticle regime and finally to bulk and how the various physical and chemical properties of a nanometer-size chunk of material are affected by its dimensionality, size, and the environment. ISSPIC XVIII in Jyväskylä, Finland, made an effort to enhance the visibility of cluster science to neighboring areas of nanoparticle catalysis, interface chemistry, plasmonics, biological systems, and research on climate change while not forgetting the traditional themes in the field. The 19th conference of the series held in Hangzhou in China in 2018 continued these efforts in striving to maintain the theme of cluster science, while reaching out to the broader fields related to nanoscience and in particular nanotechnology.

After a five years intermission owing to the pandemic situation, the forthcoming ISSPIC XXI in Berlin in 2023 aims to reflect the actual status of research in the physics and chemistry of small particles and clusters. However, even more importantly, it intends to provide a platform highlighting new contributions that focus on novel aspects of finite size and small particle research like, e.g., 2D-materials (graphene and beyond), cluster research at advanced light sources, spintronics, nanodiamonds, single and few atom clusters in heterogeneous catalysis, and novel theoretical and experimental methods to study finite size effects.
