= T. I. Itkonen =

Finnish historian and linguist

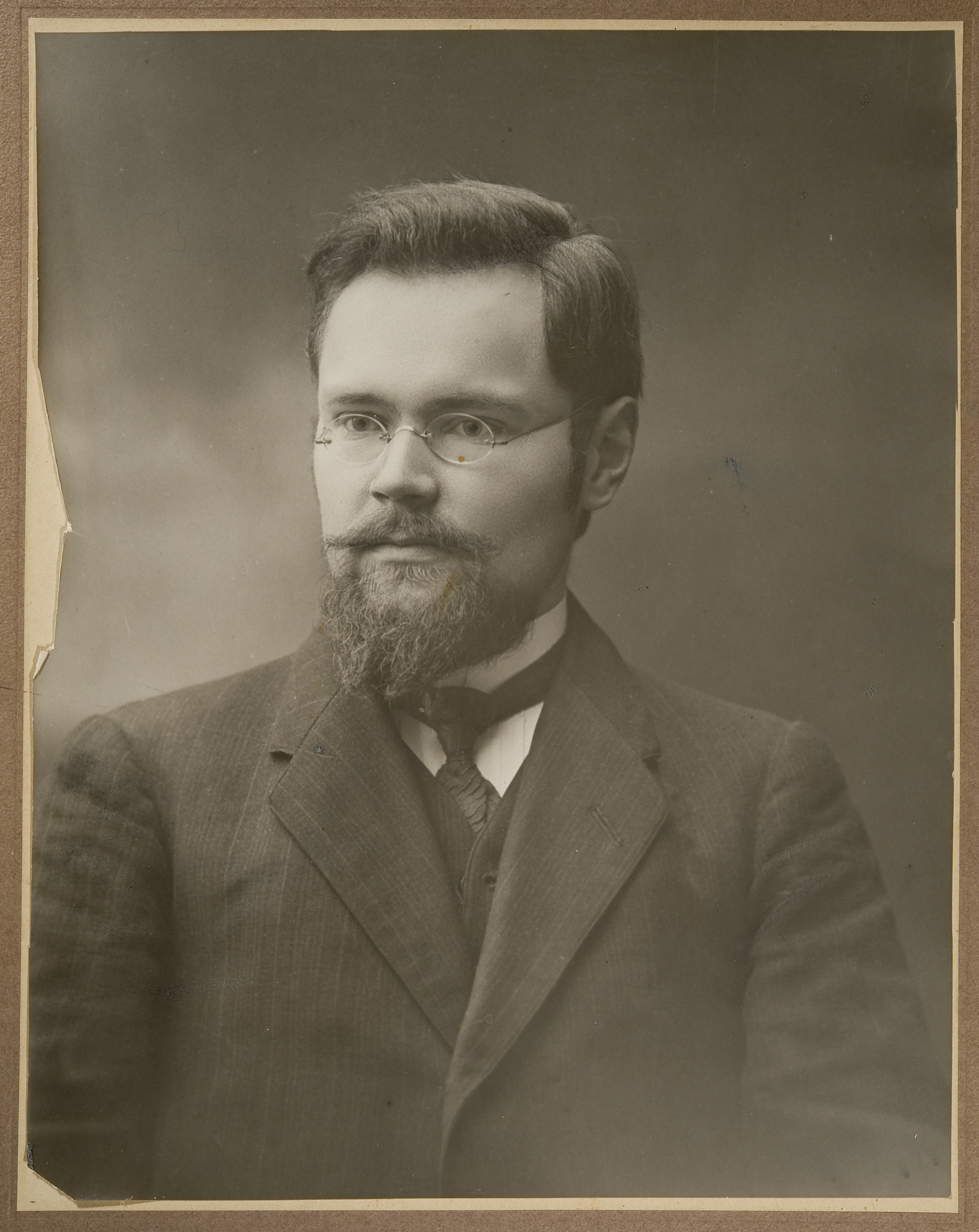
T. I. Itkonen.

Toivo Immanuel Itkonen (20 January 1891 – 12 May 1968) was a Finnish historian and linguist, specializing in the Sami languages and the history of the Sami people.

Itkonen was born in Pulkkila. His father, Lauri Arvid Itkonen (1865–1925), was the curate of the Lutheran church of Pulkkila. Lauri Itkonen and his six children moved to Inari during the spring of 1899, when Lauri received the post of rector of the Inari church. It was here that Toivo first began his education with a home tutor and then in 1901, moved to Oulu to begin secondary school. He graduated from Oulu secondary school in 1910. In 1913 he graduated from the University of Helsinki with a bachelor's degree in philosophy. In 1916 he received his master's degree and in 1923, his Doctorate.

During 1911–1949, Itkonen made 9 research trips to Lapland. He also made research trips to central Europe (1929) and Scandinavia (1931 and 1934). His last research trip was to Italy, in 1955. Based on his research in Lapland, Itkonen published the two part "The Lapps in Finland up to 1945 Vol. 1 & 2" in 1948.

Toivo Itkonen was married to Amanda Seppänen, with whom he had three children, Terho, Marja and Kerttu. He died in Helsinki, aged 77.
