= Pietari Päivärinta =

Finnish writer and Diet member

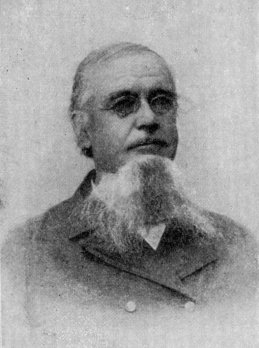
- Born: 18 September 1827; Ylivieska
- Died: 26 July 1913 (aged 85)
- Occupation: Writer

Pietari Päivärinta (18 September 1827 in Ylivieska – 26 July 1913) was a Finnish writer and Diet member. His depictions of peasant life, quickly translated and published in Germany and Scandinavia, are among the first examples of modern Finnish literature.

He was born in Ylivieska, the eldest son of day labourers. His parents' ill health often obliged him to beg for the family's food. On his marriage to Liisa Tuomikoski he bought a small farm, but was at first unable to make it pay and began a career as an itinerant singer. In 1856 he obtained a post as an assistant clerk, and slowly furthered his career in the administration before entering politics. After his first wife's death he married Anna-Liisa Koskela.

He began writing for newspapers in 1858. His autobiography, My Life, dates from 1877, and was written to pass the time during forced bedrest after breaking his leg. He participated in the Diets of 1882, 1885, 1888 and 1891, and the Synod in 1876, 1886 and 1893.

== Works ==
- Parannuksen harjoitus 1866
- Seurakunnan kosto 1867
- Elämäni 1877
- Elämän havainnoita I–X 1880–1889
- Naimisen juoruja 1882
- Tintta-Jaakko 1883
- Torpan poika 1883
- Kylään tullessa 1884
- Minä ja muut. Sakeus Pyöriän kertomuksia 1885
- Neuvoja keuhkopoltteen tuntemiseen ja parantamiseen 1885
- Käytännön neuvoja soitten ja rämeitten viljelemiseen 1886
- Isäin pahat teot lasten päällä 1887
- Jälkipoimintoja I–III 1889
- Volmari 1889
- Omistaan eläjiä 1889
- Kanttilaiset 1889
- Oukkari 1889
- Pikakuvia 1867 katovuodesta ja sen seurauksista 1893
- Valitut teokset I–III 1895
- Syyslehtiä 1900
- Pikku Mari 1903
- Muistelmia kansallistaistelujen alkuajoilta 1903
- Pikku kuvia elämästä 1904
- Siveellisyyskysymys Pohjanmaalla 1904
- Ulpukkalahti y.m. kertomuksia 1910

== Bibliography ==
- Ilmari Havu. Pietari Päivärinta. Porvoo, 1921.
- Finland: the country, its people and institutions. Otava, 1926. Page 560.
- Edna Worthley Underwood. Famous Stories from Foreign Countries. Four Seas Company, Boston, 1921. Page 134.
