= Markku Leskelä =

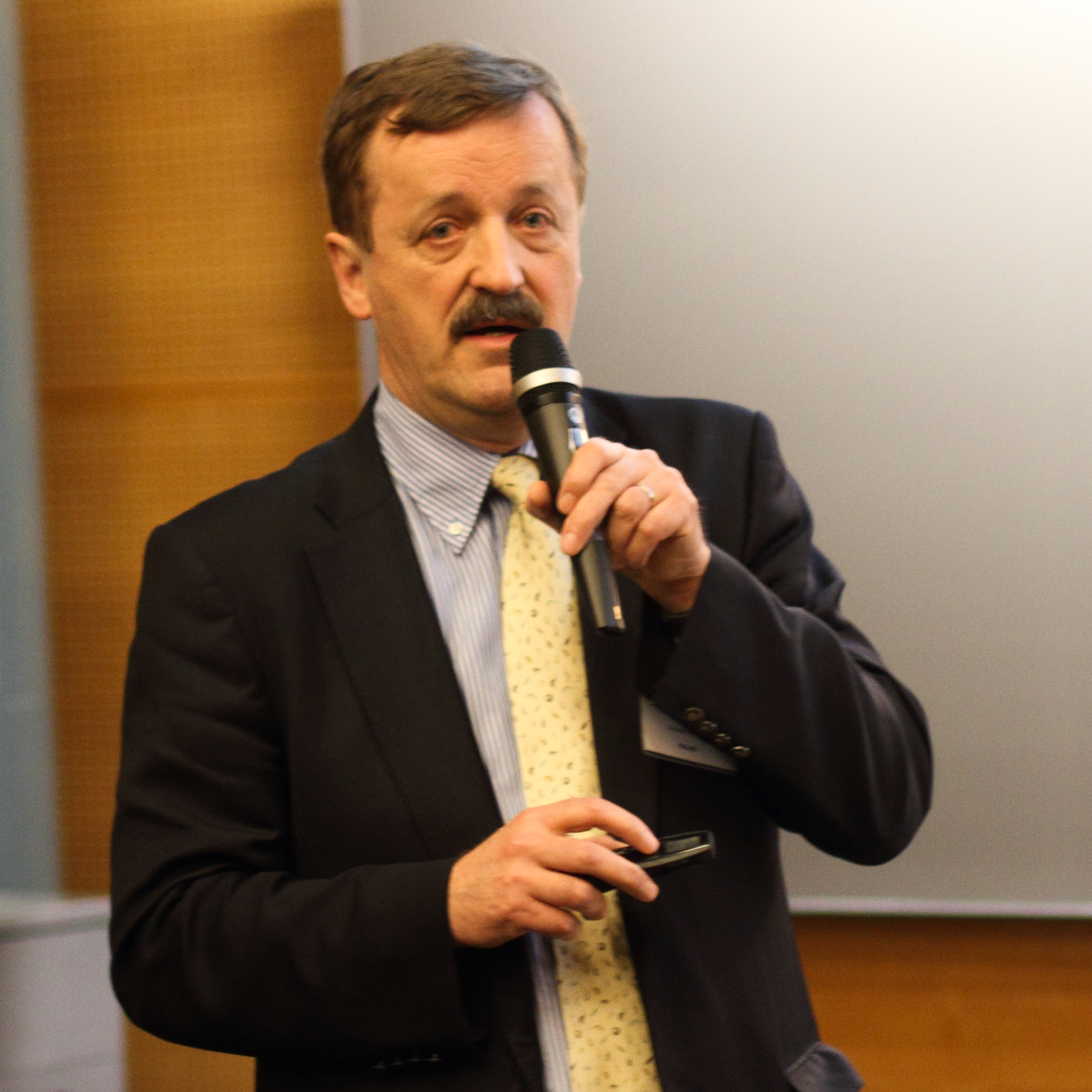
- Born: 1950 (age 75–76)
- Scientific career
- Fields: Chemistry, Inorganic Chemistry
- Workplaces: University of Helsinki

Markku Leskelä (born 1950) is a Finnish chemist and professor emeritus at University of Helsinki, known for his leading research in atomic layer deposition (ALD).

Markku Leskelä was the leader of the Finnish Centre of Excellence in ALD (2012-2017) by the University of Helsinki and VTT Technical Research Centre of Finland.

Markku Leskelä started ALD research (then called atomic layer epitaxy) in the early 1980s at Helsinki University of Technology (nowadays Aalto University) with Prof. Lauri Niinistö. In 2012, he received the ALD Innovation Prize at the international ALD conference.
