= Reinhold Ferdinand Sahlberg =

Finnish naturalist (1811–1874)

Reinhold Ferdinand Sahlberg (23 December 1811 in Åbo – 18 March 1874 in Yläne) was a Finnish naturalist notably specialising in entomology.

He was the son of the entomologist and botanist Carl Reinhold Sahlberg (1774–1860) and the father of the entomologist and explorer Johan Reinhold Sahlberg (1845–1920).

In 1827 Reinhold Sahlberg entered, at the age of sixteen, the Imperial Alexander University in Finland where his father taught. He received his magister in 1836 and his title of doctor of medicine in 1840.

Between 1839 and 1843, he participated as a naturalist in a circumnavigation to Brazil, Chile and then to Sitka in Alaska which returned by Siberia.

Between 1845 and 1852, Reinhold Sahlberg worked as assistant of zoology and botany at the University of Helsingfors (Helsingfors Universitet – Swedish for Helsinki). In 1849–1851 he returned to Brazil.

The rich collections made by Sahlberg lie today in the Finnish Museum of Natural History and the Swedish Museum of Natural History.

== Works ==
- Sahlberg, R. F. 1834: Dissertatio academica. Novas Coleopterorum Fennicorum species sistens. Helsingforsiae, Typis Frenckelliorum 1–12
- Sahlberg, R. F. 1834 Novae Coleopterorum Fennicorum species. Bulletin de la Société Impériale des Naturalistes de Moscou, Moscou 7: 267–280
- Sahlberg, R. F. 1844 In Faunam Insectorum Rossicam symbola, novas ad Ochotsk lectas Carabicorum species continens, quam, venia amplissime facultatis philosophicae ad Universitatem Imperialem Alexandream in Fennia, Resp. Josepho Benjamino von Pfaler, ... In Auditorio Philos. die VII Decembris MDCCCXLIV. Helsingforsae, ex officina Typographica Frenckelliana 1-154+[1] p.
- Sahlberg, R. F. 1844–1847 Coleoptera diebus XV – XXVII decembris anni MDCCCXXXIX ad Rio Janeiro lecta. Acta Societatis Scientiarum Fennicae, Helsingforsae 2 (1, 2)
- Sahlberg, R. F. 1844 In Faunam Insectorum Rossicam symbola, novas ad Ochotsk lectas Carabicorum species sistens. (Diss. inaug.). Resp. J. B. von Pfaler. Acta Societatis Scientiarum Fennicae, Helsingforsae
- Sahlberg, R. F. 1847 Coleoptera diebus XV – XXVII decembris anni MDCCCXXXIX ad Rio Janeiro lecta. (Continuatio). Acta Societatis Scientiarum Fennicae, Helsingforsae – 2 (2) 787–805
- Sahlberg, R. F. 1844 Monographia Geocorisarum Fenniae quam Venia Amplissimae Facultatis Philosophicae ad Universitatem Imperialem Alexandream in Fennia
