= Carl Reinhold Sahlberg =

Finnish naturalist (1779–1860)

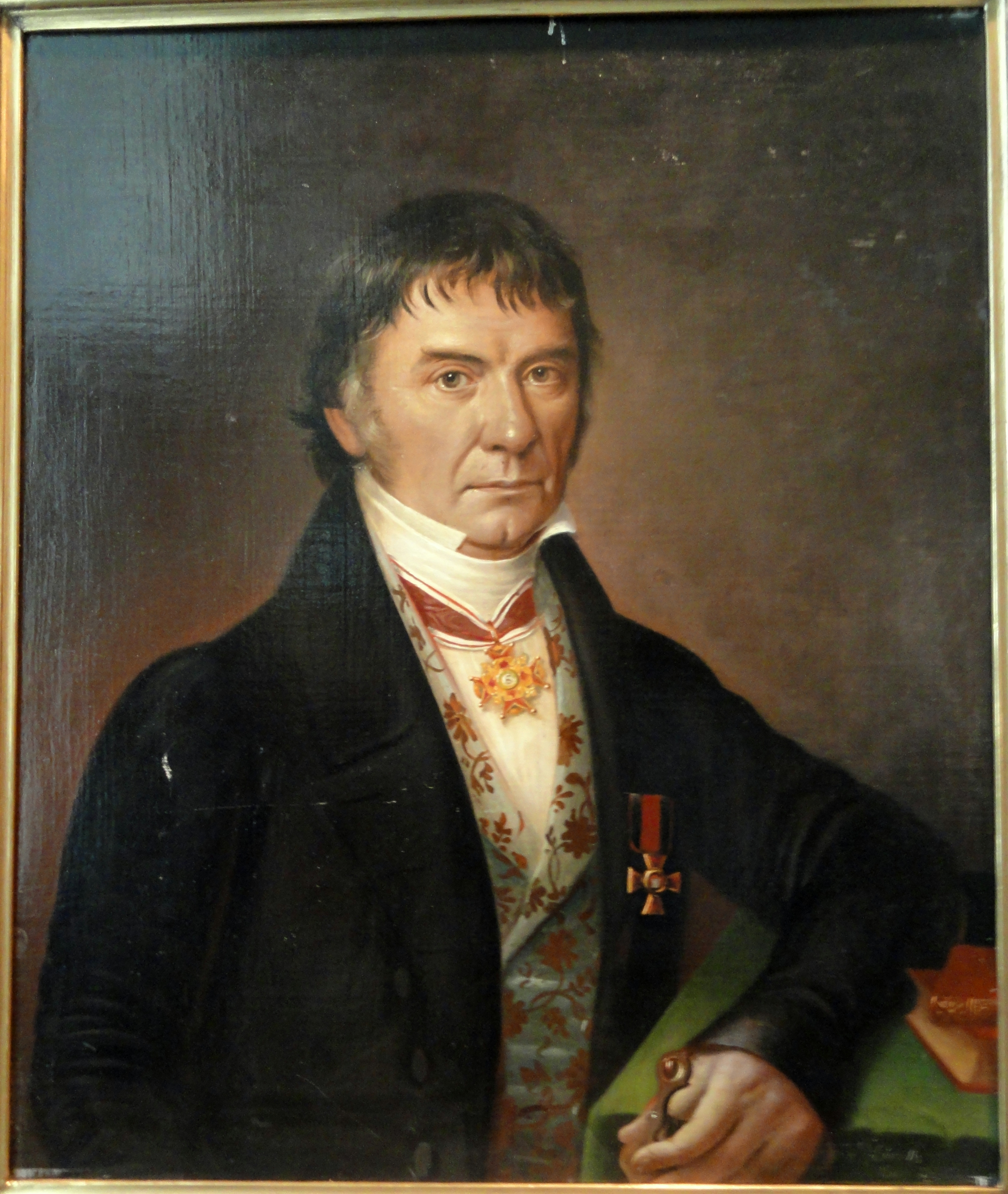
Carl Reinhold Sahlberg. Portrait by Johan Erik Lindh in 1839

Carl Reinhold Sahlberg (January 22, 1779, Eura – October 18, 1860, Yläne) was a Finnish naturalist, primarily an entomologist specializing in beetles. He was the father of entomologist Reinhold Ferdinand Sahlberg (1811–1874), grandfather of entomologist Johan Reinhold Sahlberg (1845–1920), and great grandfather of Uunio Saalas (1882–1969).

== Biography ==
In 1818 Carl Reinhold Sahlberg succeeded Carl Niclas Hellenius as professor of economy and natural history at Finland’s then only University in Turku (Åbo), the Academy of Åbo. In 1827 the town and the university were destroyed by fire. The remnants of the natural history collections were taken to Helsinki where the University then moved under the name of Imperial Alexander University in Finland (and eventually became University of Helsinki in 1918). Sahlberg replaced the lost collections, played a major role in establishing a new botanical garden in Helsinki, and with his pupils organised a scientific society "Societas pro Fauna et Flora Fennica". Its only scope was natural history. The society widened to include other sectors of biology only in 1921.

Sahlberg's son Reinhold Ferdinand Sahlberg, grandson Johan Reinhold Sahlberg and his son Uunio Saalas were also entomologists.

== Works ==
- Dissertatio entomologica insecta Fennica enumerans (Coleoptera) 1834

== Collections ==
Sahlberg's insect collection is in the Finnish Museum of Natural History.
