= Order of the White Rose of Finland =

Order of merit for distinguished service

Order of the White Rose of Finland: Suomen Valkoisen Ruusun ritarikunta; Finlands Vita Ros’ orden
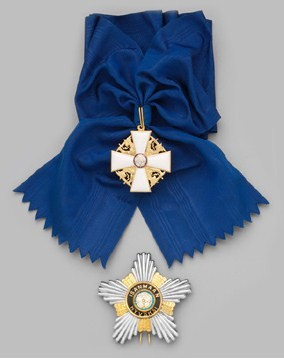
- Grand Cross of the White Rose of Finland

Awarded by Finland
- Type: State order
- Established: January 28, 1919; 107 years ago
- Country: Finland
- Seat: House of the Estates
- Ribbon: Ultramarine
- Motto: Isänmaan hyväksi ('For the Good of the Fatherland')
- Eligibility: Finnish nationals and foreigners
- Criteria: Distinguished service to the fatherland
- Status: Currently constituted
- Founder: Carl Gustaf Emil Mannerheim
- Grand Master: Alexander Stubb
- Chancellor: Timo Laitinen
- Vice-Chancellor: Anita Lehikoinen
- Classes: Grand Cross; First Class Commander; Commander; First Class Knight; Knight
- Website: ritarikunnat.fi/language/en

Statistics
- First induction: February 12, 1919

Precedence
- Next (higher): None
- Next (lower): Order of the Cross of Liberty
- Ribbon of the Order of the White Rose of Finland

The Order of the White Rose of Finland (Finnish: Suomen Valkoisen Ruusun ritarikunta; Swedish: Finlands Vita Ros’ orden) is one of three official orders in Finland, along with the Order of the Cross of Liberty, and the Order of the Lion of Finland. The President of Finland is the Grand Master of all three orders. The orders are administered by boards consisting of a chancellor, a vice-chancellor and at least four members. The orders of the White Rose of Finland and the Lion of Finland have a joint board.

== History ==
The Order of the White Rose of Finland was established by Gustaf Mannerheim in his capacity as regent (temporary head of state) on January 28, 1919. The name comes from the victory of the White side in the Finnish Civil War 1918 and from the heraldic rose, of which there are nine argent ones on the coat of arms of Finland. The order's rules and regulations were confirmed on May 16, 1919, and its present rules date from June 1, 1940. The revised scale of ranks was confirmed most recently in 1985. The original decorations were designed by Akseli Gallen-Kallela. The swastikas of the collar were replaced by fir crosses in 1963, designed by heraldic artist Gustaf von Numers. The honour can be granted for military as well as civilian merit.

== Insignia ==
The ribbon for all classes is ultramarine, as it is found in the flag of Finland, although officially the statutes do not define the color of the ribbon beyond it being "dark blue". The motto of the order appears on the medallion and is Isänmaan hyväksi (Finnish for 'For the Good of the Fatherland').

The president of Finland wears the Grand Cross of the White Rose of Finland with Collar (a neck chain). The Collar is worn four centimetres from either side and hangs at equal distances at the front and back. The Grand Cross and Commander marks are awarded with a breast star.

== Classes ==
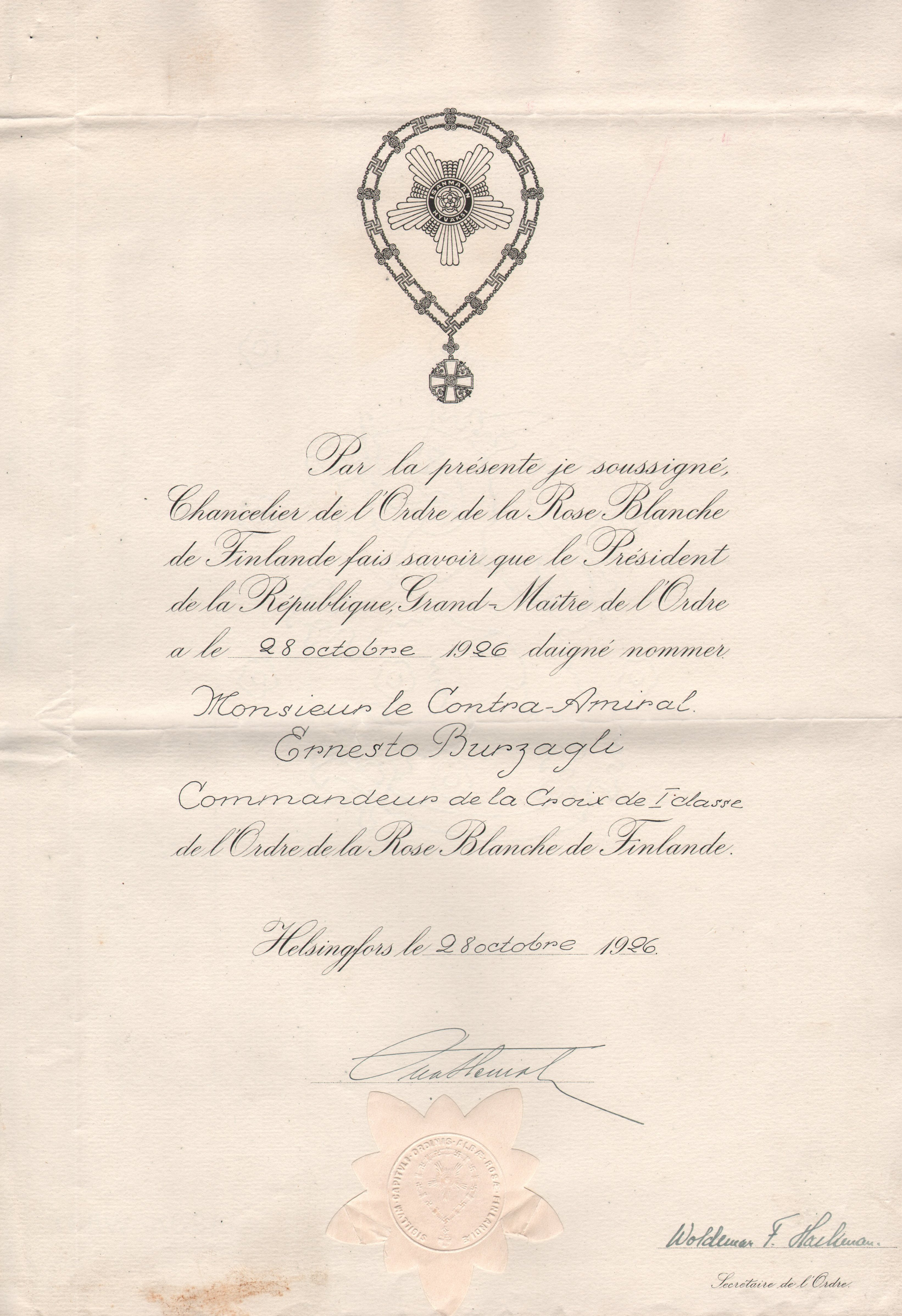
Diploma of the order

The classes of the order of the White Rose of Finland are:

- Grand Cross of the White Rose of Finland with Collar
- Grand Cross of the White Rose of Finland
- First Class Commander of the White Rose of Finland
- Commander of the White Rose of Finland
- First Class Knight of the White Rose of Finland
- Knight (Chevalier) of the White Rose of Finland
- Cross of Merit of the White Rose of Finland
- First Class Medal of the White Rose of Finland with golden cross
- First Class Medal of the White Rose of Finland
- Medal of the White Rose of Finland

== Recipients ==
Generally the Grand Cross with Collar is awarded only to foreign heads of state, e.g. to King Fuad I of Egypt (1935), Charles de Gaulle (1962), Josip Broz Tito (1963) and King Birendra of Nepal (1988). In the case of royals, consorts may be awarded with it. Heirs apparent of Nordic monarchies have also been awarded. The Grand Master may however in principle award it at his pleasure. During World War II Hermann Göring and Joachim von Ribbentrop were exceptionally given the Grand Cross with Collar because Adolf Hitler would not receive orders.

Prime ministers of Finland customarily receive the Grand Cross. Certain leftist politicians refused the cross or did not wear it, and the transient term in office of Anneli Jäätteenmäki did not lead to the president awarding the cross. The Grand Cross is also given to presidents of the Supreme Court and the Supreme Administrative Court, the archbishop of Turku and Finland, and the chancellor of the order.

=== Recipients list ===
Selected recipients of the Order of the White Rose of Finland
Year	Commander	Notes
1919	(Finland) Carl Gustaf Emil Mannerheim	Regent of Finland (1918–1919); Commander-in-Chief of the Finnish Defence Forces (1918, 1939–1946); President of Finland (1944–1946)
1926	(Kingdom of Italy) Ernesto Burzagli	
1930	(Czechoslovakia) Tomáš Masaryk	President of Czechoslovakia
1931	(Hungary) Miklós Horthy	Regent of Hungary
1934	(United Kingdom) Shaul Tchernichovsky	
1934	(United Kingdom) Gladys Wright	"for her contribution to improving relations between Britain and Finland."
1939	(Nazi Germany) Walther von Brauchitsch	
1941	Dean Driscoll	for services "toward relieving the civilian population of wartorn Finland".
1941	(Nazi Germany) Hermann Göring	politician, military leader
1941	(Nazi Germany) Eduard Dietl	
1941	(Nazi Germany) Josef Veltjens	
1942	(Nazi Germany) Joachim von Ribbentrop	
1942	(Japan) Hirohito	Emperor of Japan
1942	(Romania) Ion Antonescu	
1951	(Finland) Bernard Aabel	In 1948, Aabel became the Assistant Military Attaché in Helsinki, Finland.
1955	(United Kingdom) Sir Thomas Beecham	
1956	(Soviet Union) Kliment Voroshilov	
1960	(Finland) Jarl Lindfors	
1961	(Finland) Maggie Gripenberg	
1962	(France) Charles de Gaulle	
1963	(Socialist Federal Republic of Yugoslavia) Josip Broz Tito	
1963	(Socialist Federal Republic of Yugoslavia) Koča Popović	
1965	(India) Sarvepalli Radhakrishnan	
1967	(Egypt) Gamal Abdel Nasser	
1967	(Hungary) Zoltán Kodály	
1969	(United Kingdom) Anne, Princess Royal	
1970	(Pahlavi Iran) Mohammad Reza Pahlavi	Shah of Iran
1971	(Finland) Olli Mannermaa	
1971	(New Zealand) Arthur Lydiard	
1974	(Sweden) Carl XVI Gustaf	King of Sweden
1976	(Soviet Union) Leonid Brezhnev	
1978	(Soviet Union) Dmitriy Ustinov	Marshal of the Soviet Union
1984	(United States) Arthur J. Collingsworth	
1988	(Finland) Ensio Seppänen	
1988	(Nepal) Birendra Bir Bikram Shah	Late king of Nepal
1991	(Finland) Margareta Steinby	
1996	(Thailand) Bhumibol Adulyadej	King of Thailand
2004	(Finland) Elwin Svenson	Executive director – International Programs, FEMBA/GAP programs, UCLA Anderson School of Management "for assisting the expansion of Finnish start-up companies through the UCLA Anderson's Global Access Program."
2004	(Finland) Kalervo Kummola	Knight of the Order of White Rose of Finland, ice hockey executive, businessman, and politician
2004	(Republic of Ireland) Dáithí O'Ceallaigh	
2004	(Ukraine) Viktor Pylypenko	historian
2005	(Ukraine) Kostiantyn Tyshchenko	Philologist, linguist
2006	(Finland) Erkki Oja	
2007	(Croatia) Rada Borić	
2008	(Australia) Timothy Rodd Purcell	Chairman of Finland Australia Chamber of Commerce
2008	(Australia) Simon Beresford-Wylie	Chief executive officer, Nokia Siemens Networks
2009	(Estonia) Mart Laar	
2009	(Kazakhstan) Nursultan Nazarbayev	President of Kazakhstan
2009	(Syria) Bashar al-Assad	
2010	(India) Rajendra Kumar Pachauri	
2012	(Finland) Sauli Niinistö	President of Finland (2012–2024)
2012	(Finland) Armi Kuusela	Miss Universe 1952
2015	(Finland) Anna-Maja Henriksson	
2015	(Finland) Tapani Jyrki Tarvainen	Chevalier (Knight) of the White Rose of Finland
2016	(Finland) Pauline Kiltinen	Cross of Merit of the Order of the White Rose for the promotion of Finnish culture including the commissioning of Rockland the Opera
2022	(Finland) Hanna Vehkamäki	
2022	(Finland) Sanna Marin	Prime Minister of Finland (2019-2023)
2024	(Finland) Alexander Stubb	President of Finland (2024–)
2024	(Estonia) Alar Karis	President of Estonia (2021–)
2025	(Denmark) Frederik X	King of Denmark (2024-)
2025	(Ukraine) Volodymyr Zelenskyy	President of Ukraine (2019–), Grand Cross with Collar
2025	(Latvia) Edgars Rinkēvičs	President of Latvia (2023-)
2025	Willem-Alexander of the Netherlands	King of the Netherlands (2013-)
2025	Máxima of the Netherlands	Queen of Netherlands (2013-)
2026	Felipe VI of Spain	King of Spain (2014-)
2026	Letizia of Spain	Queen of Spain (2014-)

=== Special honors ===
- Grand Cross with Collar, Jewels and Swords was awarded only once, to Carl Gustaf Emil Mannerheim on 4 June 1944.
- Grand Cross with Jewels, to three Finns: Senator Otto Stenroth in 1938, Foreign Minister Carl Enckell in 1946 and Jean Sibelius in 1950.
- Grand Cross with Swords has been awarded to three Finnish lieutenant generals: Hjalmar Siilasvuo, Edvard Hanell and Aksel Airo. The decoration has also been awarded to a number of foreign high officers, such as the German Colonel General Eduard Dietl.

== See also ==
- Orders, decorations, and medals of Finland
