= University of Oulu =

University in Oulu, Finland

- Oulun yliopisto
- Latin: Universitas Uloensis
- Type: Public
- Established: 1958; 68 years ago
- Affiliations: EUA UArctic UNIC European University
- Rector: Arto Maaninen
- Administrative staff: 3800 (2024)
- Students: 14,200 (2024)
- Location: Oulu, Finland; 65°03′33″N 025°27′58″E
- Website: www.oulu.fi

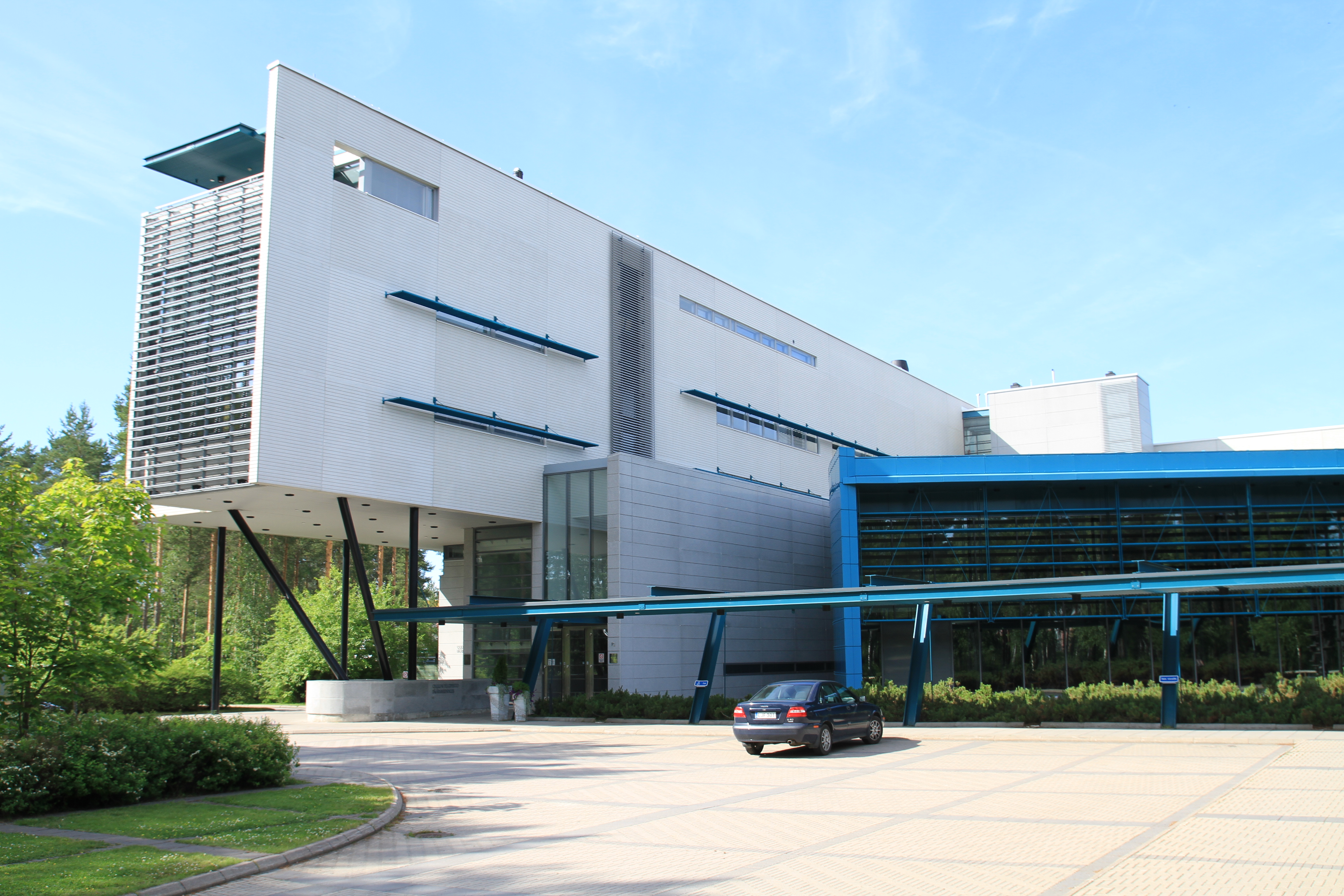
University of Oulu main building in Linnanmaa, Oulu

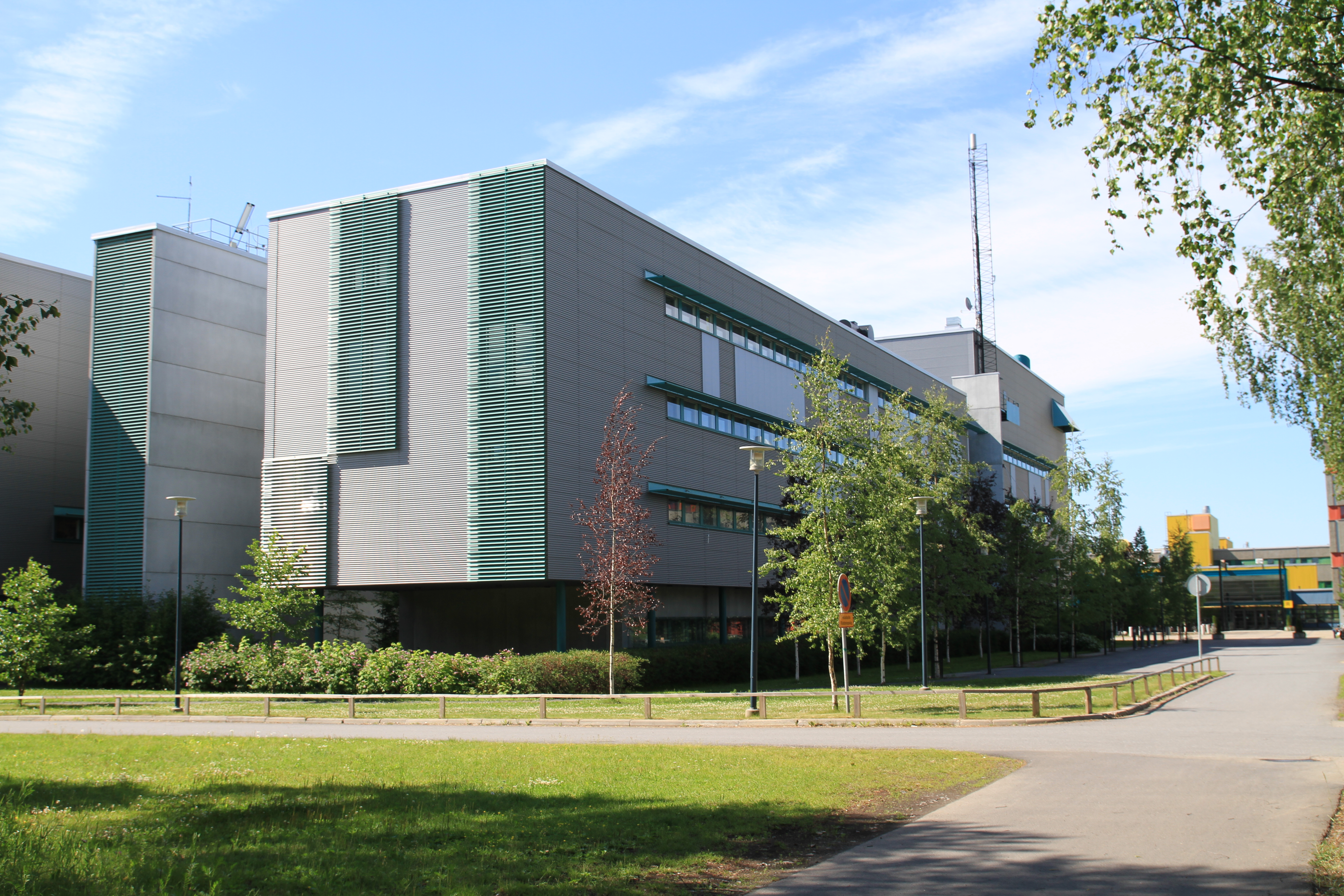
Faculty of Information Technology and Electrical Engineering in the Linnanmaa campus

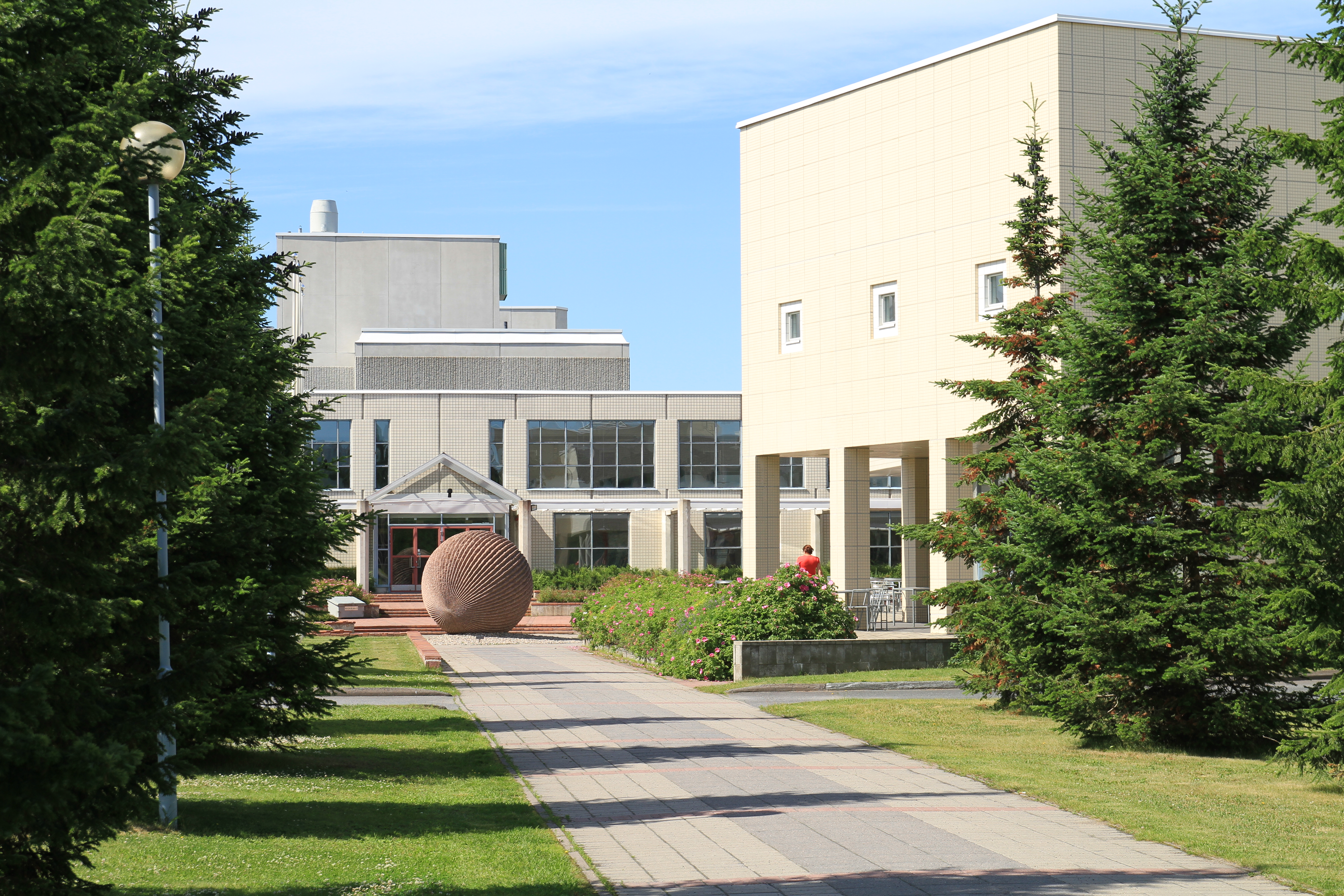
Former Faculty of Humanities located at the northern end of the university building; since 2020 northern end has been used by Oulu University of Applied Sciences.

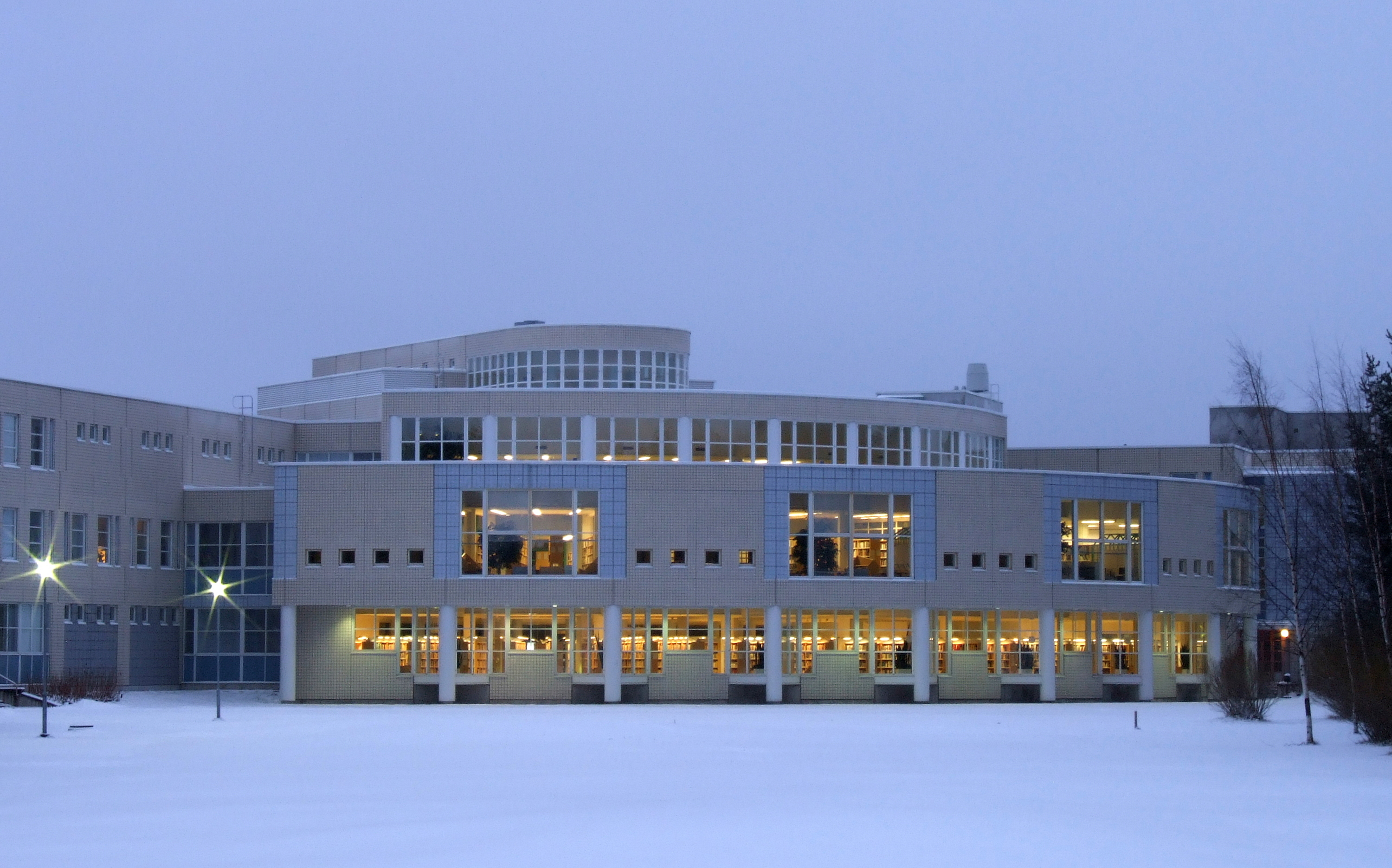
Oulu University Pegasus Library (former Main Library) in Linnanmaa

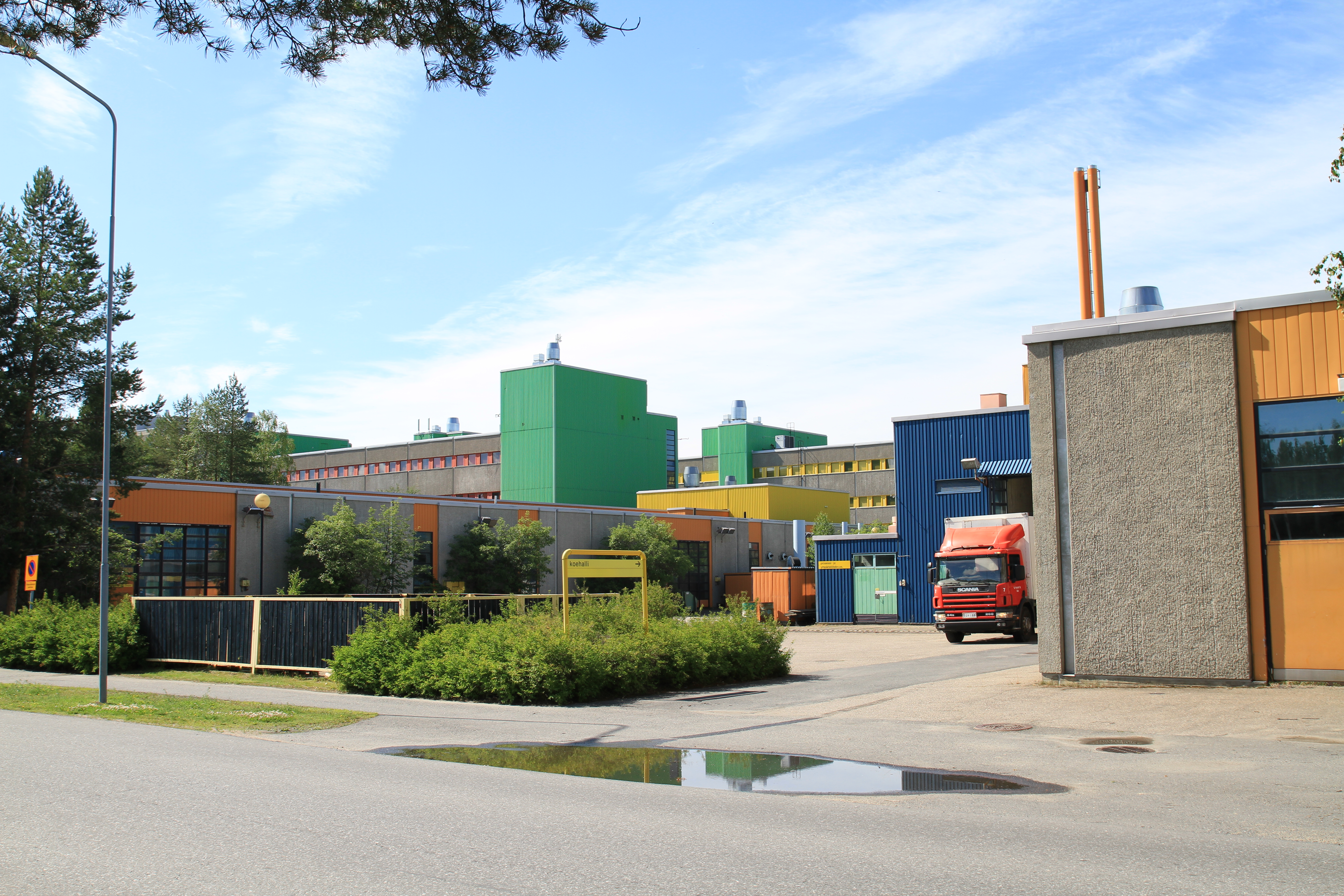
Old part of the Linnanmaa campus

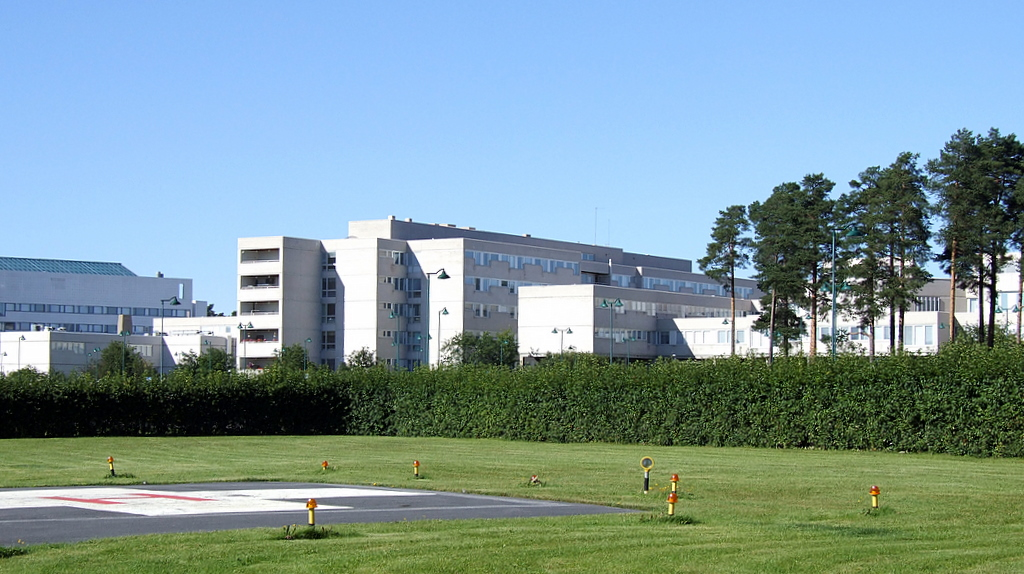
Oulu University Hospital buildings in Kontinkangas, Oulu, where the Faculty of Medicine is located; the heliport of the hospital in the foreground.

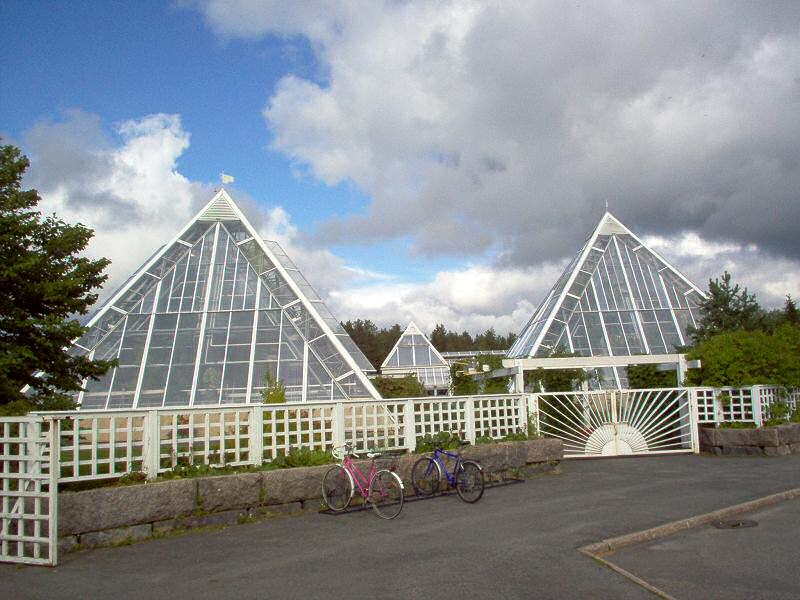
Oulu University Botanical Gardens

The University of Oulu (Finnish: Oulun yliopisto) is one of the largest universities in Finland, located in the city of Oulu. It was founded on July 8, 1958. The university has around 14,800 students and 4,300 staff. More than 20 International Master's Programmes are offered at the university. The university is often ranked as one of the best universities in Finland and in the top 400 worldwide.

== History ==
- 1919 Oulu College Association was founded to manage the establishment of a university in the town
- 1958 Oulu University Act
- 1959 Activities begin. Faculty of Philosophy (programs in biology and mathematics), Faculty of Technology (architecture, civil and industrial engineering) and Oulu Teaching School
- 1960 Faculty of Medicine
- 1965 Teaching begins in humanities
- 1965 Departments of Electrical Engineering and Machine Engineering added to the Faculty of Technology
- 1972 The Faculty of Humanities and the Faculty of Natural Sciences founded with the division of the Faculty of Philosophy
- 1974 Faculty of Education
- 1985 Professorship in Telecommunications Technology established at the Faculty of Technology
- 1994 Biotechnology, Information Technology and Northern Issues defined as focus areas
- 2000 Founding of the Faculty of Economics and Business Administration
- 2006 Micro- and Nanotechnology Centre
- 2007 Oulu Mining School
- 2008 Martti Ahtisaari Institute of Global Business and Economics
- 2009 Center for Internet Excellence (CIE)
- 2010 New University Act, new focus areas
- 2011 Center of Microscopy and Nanotechnology founded by joining the Micro- and Nanotechnology Centre and the Institute for Electron Microscopy
- 2011 University of Oulu Graduate School (from 1.8.2011)
- 2014 Faculty of Biochemistry and Molecular Medicine (from 1.1.2014)
- 2014 Faculty of Information Technology and Electrical Engineering (from 1.1.2014)
- 2014 Oulu School of Architecture (from 1.1.2014)

== Campuses ==
There are two campus areas:

- The main campus is located in Linnanmaa, about 5 kilometres (3 mi) north of Oulu city centre. It includes six faculties, four centres for multidisciplinary research, Botanical Gardens and Museum, and university library Pegasus, and Tellus co-working spaces. Thule Institute and Giellagas Institute are also situated in Linnanmaa.
- The faculties of Medicine and Biochemistry and Molecular Medicine are located at the Kontinkangas Campus 2 kilometres (1.2 mi) southeast from the city center, Kontinkangas, Oulu. Oulu University Hospital, Medical Research Centre (MRC) and Biocenter Oulu are also located there.

== Faculties and units ==
The University of Oulu has eight faculties:

- Faculty of Biochemistry and Molecular Medicine
- Faculty of Education and Psychology
- Faculty of Humanities
- Faculty of Information Technology and Electrical Engineering
- Faculty of Medicine
- Faculty of Science
- Faculty of Technology
- Oulu Business School

There are four centres for multidisciplinary research at the University of Oulu:

- Biocenter Oulu
- Eudaimonia Institute
- Infotech Oulu
- Kvantum Institute

In addition to the City of Oulu, the University of Oulu operates in several locations in Northern Finland:

- Kajaani University Consortium
- Sodankylä Geophysical Observatory
- Oulanka Biological Research Station (Kuusamo)
- Kerttu Saalasti Institute (Nivala) (former Oulu Southern Institute),
  - Callio Lab
- Kokkola University Consortium Chydenius

== Research ==
The University of Oulu has a wide range of scientific disciplines and promotes interdisciplinary research through university's profile areas and multidisciplinary research centres.

There are about 2,500 researchers and hundreds of ongoing research projects at the University of Oulu. About 70 invention disclosures are done yearly from the University of Oulu. The university has also served as a birthing place for over 80 research-based companies.

== International cooperation ==
The University of Oulu is an active partner in numerous local, national, and international networks in research, education, and innovations. The university is for example an active member of the University of the Arctic. UArctic is an international cooperative network based in the Circumpolar Arctic region, consisting of more than 200 universities, colleges, and other organizations with an interest in promoting education and research in the Arctic region.

The University of Oulu aims to promote mobility among its students. It takes part in several international exchange programmes, such as Erasmus Programme (Europe), ISEP and International to International ISEP (USA, South America, Asia), north2north (USA, Canada, Nordic Countries). Besides, the University of Oulu has about 60 bilateral agreements with partner universities around the world.

== Academic rankings and statistics ==
University rankings

Global – Overall
- ARWU World: 401–500 (2024)
- QS World: 342 (2026)
- THE World: 251–300 (2025)
- USNWR Global: =421 (2025)

The University of Oulu has been consistent in gender equality securing a ratio of 53 men to 47 women. The University has also consistently increased in citation per faculty ratio over the years, with positive increases each year.

The University of Oulu has rapidly risen in rankings in recent years, and is ranked in the top 3 Finnish Universities according to the QS 2024 World University rankings. Overall, the university is a popular choice for both international and domestic applicants in Finland and has been steadily improving in academic reputation.

In the year 2022, The University of Oulu received 17,667 domestic applications, and accepted 2,497 new students, making the University's 2022 domestic acceptance rate 14%. Because of this, The University of Oulu is a competitive university to get accepted into.

== Notable alumni ==
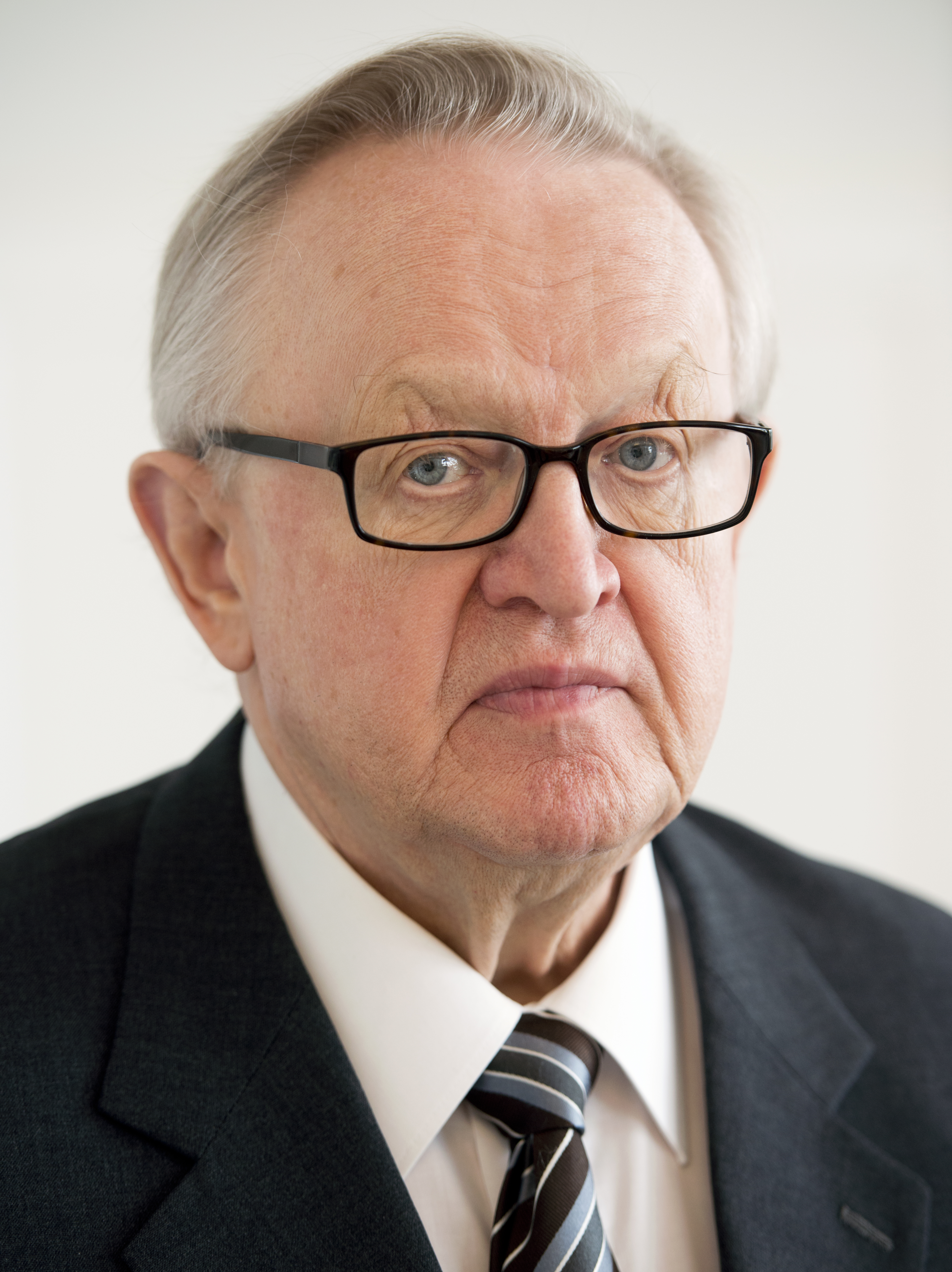
President Martti Ahtisaari, founder of CMI and recipient of the Nobel Peace Prize in 2008

- Martti Ahtisaari, M.Sc., President of Finland (1994–2000), Nobel Peace Prize laureate (2008)
- Helena Aksela, Ph.D., first female professor of physics in Finland.
- Leena Ala-Kokko, Ph.D., professor, biochemist, molecular biologist; co-founder and president of Connective Tissue Gene Tests.
- Jarkko Oikarinen, D.Sc., the developer of Internet Relay Chat (IRC).
- Leena Palotie, D.Sc., professor, geneticist
- Jussi Pesonen, M.Sc. (Tech.), CEO of UPM-Kymmene Oyj.
- Sakari Orava, D.Sc., professor, surgeon specializing in sports related injuries. Famous for operating surgeries on many top athletes such as David Beckham.
- Vuokko Hirvonen, Ph.D., professor and author, noted scholar of Sámi literature and education policies
- Lasse Lehtinen, Ph.D., former Member of the Finnish Parliament and former Member of the European Parliament.
- Pekka Aikio, M.Sc., president of the Sami Parliament of Finland for three terms from 1996 to 2008.
- Tytti Isohookana-Asunmaa, Ph.D. Finnish Minister of Culture (1991–1995), member of the Finnish parliament, from the Centre Party (1983).
- Marjo-Riitta Järvelin, M.D., Ph.D., epidemiologist and professor
- Tuija Lehtinen, B.Sc., (Stat.), writer, freelance author. Known for Mirkka, Laura and Janne novel series, chief scriptwriter of The Dibidogs animation series.
- Sami Lopakka, M.A. musician and writer, one of two guitarists for the band Sentenced (1989-2005).
- Hannu Rajaniemi B.Sc. (Math), author of science fiction and fantasy. Known novel, The Quantum Thief.
- Ago Silde M.A., Estonian politician, governor of Ida-Viru County 2004–2007.
- Jari Vilén M.A., politician and a diplomat, served in the Finnish Parliament, representing the National Coalition Party and the district of Lapland (1999–2007).
- Sauli Vuoti Ph.D. (Chem), musician, chemist, and freelance writer, vocalist and guitarist of the band Kinetik Control, founder of Inferno magazine.
- Juha Sipilä M.Sc. (Tech.), Prime Minister of Finland (2015–2019)
- Pirkko Mattila M.Sc., Member of the Finnish Parliament and Minister of Social Affairs and Health
- Tytti Tuppurainen M.A., Finnish Minister for European Affairs (2019–2023), member of the Finnish parliament from the Social Democratic Party
- Jaana Bäck Ph.D., Finnish plant ecologist and professor of forest-atmosphere interactions at the University of Helsinki

University of Oulu alumni body is over 55,000.

== Rectors ==
	Years
Arto Maaninen	2025-
Jouko Niinimäki	2015–2024
Lauri Lajunen	1993–2015
Juhani Oksman	1990–1993
L. Kalevi Korhonen	1987–1990
Markku Mannerkoski	1968–1987
Erkki Koiso-Kanttila	1965–1968
Niilo Söyrinki	1963–1965
Pentti Kaitera	1959–1962

== Student services ==
Student Union of the University of Oulu (Finnish: Oulun yliopiston ylioppilaskunta; OYY) provides services to and supervises the interests of all undergraduate degree students in the University of Oulu. All bachelor's and master's degree students at the University of Oulu belong to the Student Union. By paying the Student Union membership fee, students are entitled to a student card which allows them to get student services and discounts. This way, students get inexpensive or free medical and dental care from Finnish Student Health Services, (Finnish: Ylioppilaiden terveydenhoitosäätiö; YTHS) traveling discounts in trains and buses, student meals reduction, etc.

There are a number of students organizations or so-called student guilds presented within the University.

=== Student housing ===
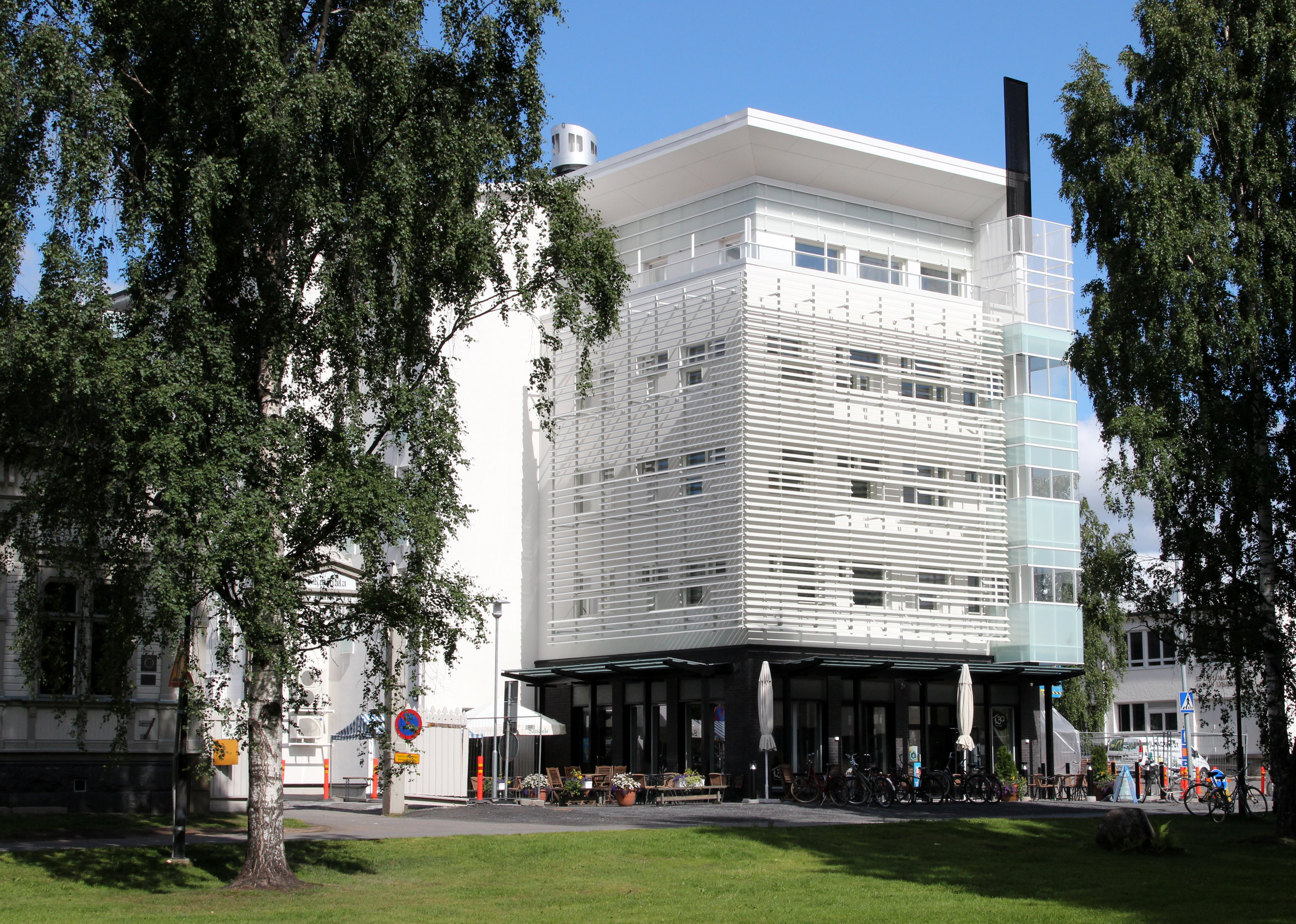
Student house Aurora

Student Housing Foundation of Northern Finland (Finnish: Pohjois-Suomen opiskelija-asuntosäätiö; PSOAS) is the leading provider of student accommodation in Oulu. The organization operates on a foundation basis which ensures affordable rents for students. Following its mission, PSOAS offers housing services for people studying in Oulu as economically as possible. The residents of PSOAS houses in different areas around the city elect tenant committee for that area, which e.g. organises different activities, maintains club rooms and does other related issues, depending on the active members.

The new international student house, named Aurora, was built next to PSOAS housing office in downtown Oulu. The building was finished during the spring of 2013. The house is supposed to be accommodated both by international degree students and Finnish students. The main purpose of the new building is to support the internationalization of Oulu and give the international students better access to Finnish culture and local people. The premises will also support these efforts: More space is dedicated for casual get-togethers, as there is a lounge space on every floor and a café of high level will be serving both Finnish and foreign customers on the ground floor.

The International Student Barometer 2019 ranked the University of Oulu first in the world when it comes to internet access and sixth in overall life satisfaction.

== See also ==
- City of Oulu
- List of universities in Finland
