= Sakari Orava =

Finnish sports medicine surgeon, physician and orthopedist

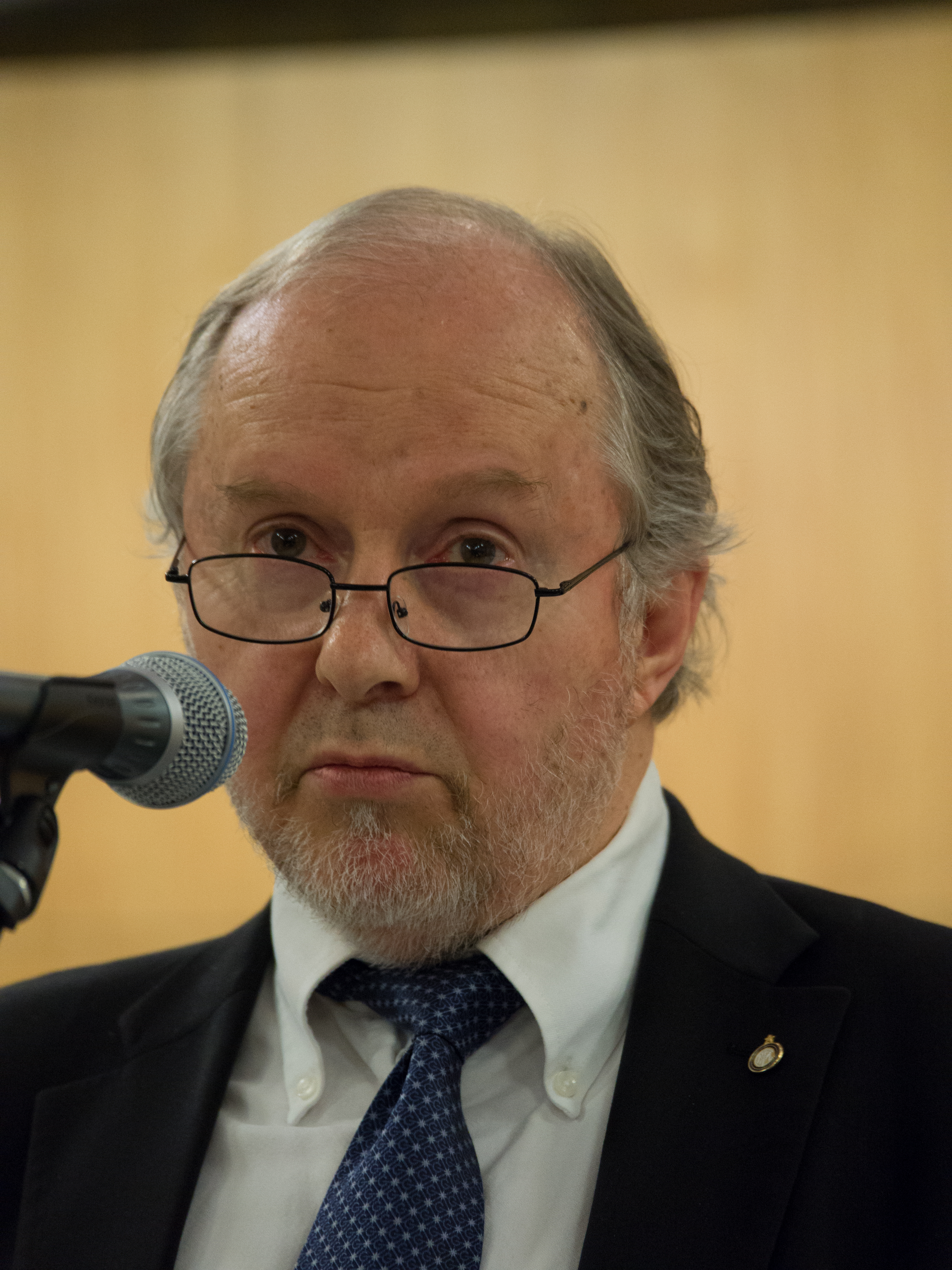
- Born: 17 June 1945 (age 81); Kokkola, Finland
- Education: University of Oulu
- Years active: 1980 to 2020
- Known for: Surgeon for top athletes
- Medical career
- Profession: Surgeon
- Institutions: Hospital NEO
- Sub-specialties: Sports medicine
- Research: Sports medicine

Yrjö Sakari Orava (born 17 June 1945) is a Finnish sports medicine surgeon, physician, orthopedist, and professor. He retired in 2020.

He attended the medical school at the University of Oulu. Orava had clinics in Turku, Rome and Madrid. He has been dubbed as "Dr. House of sports", and has performed over 20,000 surgeries throughout his career. Orava was the head physician for the Finnish Olympic team in four consecutive Summer Olympics between 1988 and 2000.

== High-profile operations ==
Orava's client list includes football clubs Real Madrid, Sevilla FC, FC Barcelona, Chelsea FC and Juventus FC. Orava has also been working with AC Milan since 1986, and he performed a successful surgery on footballer David Beckham at his clinic in Turku in March 2010 to repair his torn achilles tendon.

Orava has performed surgery on many other top athletes as well, including Emanuela Tessitore (old promise of the Italian athletic) Marco van Basten, Haile Gebrselassie, Merlene Ottey, Andrea Barzagli, Paul Pogba, Didier Deschamps, Fábio Coentrão, Pep Guardiola, and Ousmane Dembele. Spanish runner, Marta Domínguez, referred to Orava as ”como díos” – like a God.

== Personal life ==
Orava lives in Naantali, Finland, and speaks Finnish, Swedish, English, German, Spanish and Italian. He has a wife, Aira, and two children, Markus and Hanna-Maria. Orava was the 54 kg Finnish boxing champion in 1962. During his time off he enjoys painting.
