= Leena Ala-Kokko =

Finnish molecular biologist

- Born: 20 July 1961; Oulu, Finland
- Education: University of Oulu
- Awards: Finnish Science Award (1999); Anders Jahre Prize for Young Scientists (2001)
- Scientific career
- Fields: Medical biochemistry
- Institutions: Thomas Jefferson University; University of Oulu; MCP Hahnemann University; Tulane University; Connective Tissue Gene Tests

Leena Maria Ala-Kokko (née Hämäläinen; born 20 July 1961) is a Finnish biochemist and molecular biologist. Her research focuses on collagens, in particular those found in cartilage, as well as connective tissue disease. She has worked as a professor both in Finland and in the United States and, with her husband, runs a US-based company that carries out molecular diagnostic testing of connective tissue diseases.

== Early life and education ==
Leena Maria Hämäläinen (later Ala-Kokko) was born on 21 July 1961 in Oulu, Finland.

She graduated from high school at Oulun Lyseon lukio in 1980. She continued her studies at the University of Oulu, from which she obtained her licentiate in medicine in 1986, before gaining her PhD in medicine the following year. In her thesis, Ala-Kokko studied the overproduction of collagen in the skin and liver. Ala-Kokko gained research experience in professor Kari Kivirikko's collagen research group.

== Career ==
After gaining her doctorate, Ala-Kokko moved to Thomas Jefferson University in Philadelphia, United States, to carry out postdoctoral research in the group of Darwin Prockop. While there, Ala-Kokko focused her attention more directly on describing the structure, function and possible errors in genes that code for collagen proteins. She worked at Thomas Jefferson University as a research associate from 1987 to 1989, and as an instructor from 1989 to 1991.

In 1990, Ala-Kokko was granted title of docent by the University of Oulu in the field of medical biochemistry. Her research work continued to be based in Philadelphia until 1997, when she was selected as a senior research fellow by the Academy of Finland. In the same year, Ala-Kokko also started at MCP Hahnemann University as an adjunct associate professor.

In 2000, Ala-Kokko started work at the gene therapy centre of Tulane University in New Orleans. She worked there as an associate professor, and later became a full professor with tenure. In 2003 she was named professor of medical biochemistry and molecular biology at the University of Oulu. She left Tulane University in 2004.

The company Connective Tissue Gene Tests was founded by Ala-Kokko in 2004 with her husband James Hyland. They offer over a thousand tests which function as molecular diagnostic tests of connective tissue disorders. As of 2018 her responsibility in the company is for research, development and technology. She is also responsible for overseeing all the tests that the company produces.

== Research ==
Ala-Kokko's research focuses on collagen in cartilage, and connective tissue disorders. She has, with her research group, succeeded in identifying the errors in cartilage collagen that lead to the development of osteoarthritis and diseases of the vertebrae, amongst others. Her results have assisted in the diagnosis and care of patients, as well as improvements to the way in which these diseases are treated. She has published about 160 articles based on her research, and she has been awarded five patents.

== Recognition ==
In 1999, the University of Oulu collagen research group received, for the second time, the Finnish Science Award, divided amongst the group's members. In addition to Ala-Kokko, the group included professors Kari Kivirikko and Taina Pihlajaniemi.

In 2001 she received the Norwegian Anders Jahre Prize for Young Scientists.
