= Helena Aksela =

Finnish physicist (born 1947)

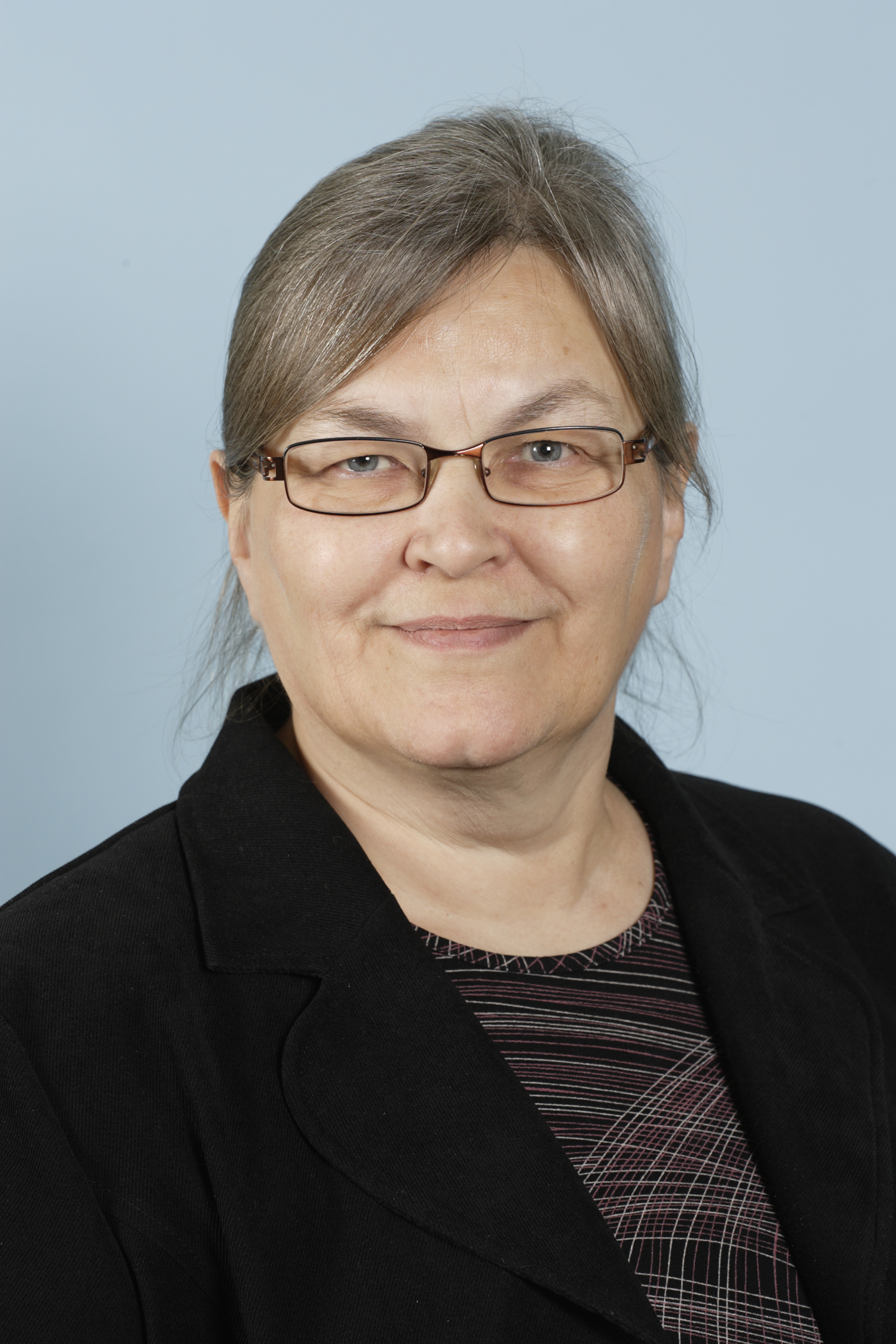
- Born: 1947 (age 78–79); Perho, Finland
- Education: University of Oulu
- Scientific career
- Fields: Atomic and molecular physics

Helena Aksela (born 1947, Perho) is a Finnish physicist and emeritus professor at the University of Oulu. She was the first woman to be appointed a professor of physics in Finland.

Aksela gained her doctorate from the University of Oulu in 1980. The electron spectroscopy group led by Aksela was, in the 1990s, one of the first groups to experimentally apply the Auger resonant Raman effect. She was named a professor at the University of Oulu in 2000, in the field of atomic and molecular physics. In 2001 she was appointed Academy Professor. Later she has worked in the department of physical sciences electron spectroscopy research group. She was a member of the Academy of Finland Research Council for Natural Sciences and Engineering from 2007 to 2009.

Aksela was made a Fellow of the Finnish Physical Society in 2013, based on her pioneering research work involving photoemission spectroscopy with synchrotrons, and associated researcher training, in addition to her active role in science politics.

Aksela is married to professor Seppo Aksela.

== Awards and recognition ==
- Award of the Pentti Kaitera fund, 2004
- Finnish Academy of Science and Letters member from 2002
- Theodor Homén Prize in 2019, awarded by the Finnish Academy of Science and Letters
