= Tuija Lehtinen =

Finnish writer

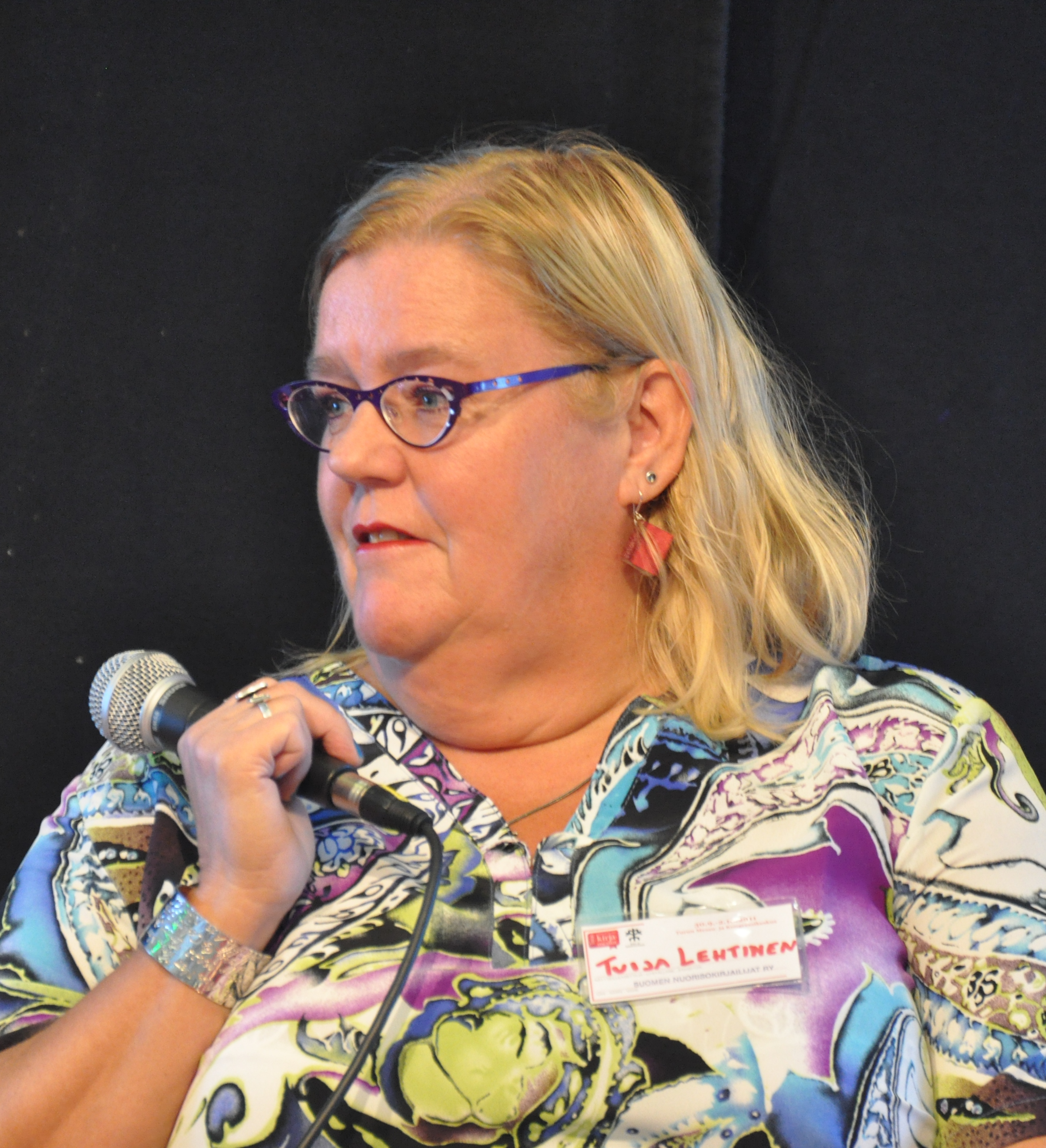
Tuija Lehtinen at the Turku International Book Fair in 2011.

Tuija Lehtinen (born 12 December 1954 in Helsinki) is a Finnish writer.

== Biography ==
In 1973 she graduated from high school in Kuopio, then in 1978 graduated with a BS from the University of Oulu, majoring in statistics. Lehtinen was a freelance journalist from 1979 to 1984 and has since worked as a freelance author. Her best-known works include the Mirkka, Laura and Janne novel series. They have been translated into Danish, Swedish, German, Estonian and Japanese.

With the love for children as well as for dogs, Tuija took part in the creating of animation series The Dibidogs as chief scriptwriter. The series’ dog characters and canine world settlement was entirely originated from children's creation, which Tuija became highly enthusiastic about. The Dibidogs animated series has now gained a popularity among children in 28 countries worldwide.

Lehtinen lives in Espoo, is married with two children and has three dogs. She is Chairperson of the Finnish youth writers.
