= Jaana Bäck =

Finish plant ecologist (born 1961)

- Born: 1961 (age 64–65)
- Education: University of Kuopio; University of Oulu
- Occupation: Plant ecologist

Jaana Kaarina Bäck (b. 1961) is a Finnish plant ecologist who works as a professor of forest-atmosphere interactions at the University of Helsinki. She has been a member of the Finnish nature panel (2020–2023).

== Life and work ==
Bäck graduated from the University of Kuopio with a M.Sc. in Environmental Science in 1985. She continued to study for a doctor of philosophy from the University of Oulu in 1994 in the field of plant ecology. Bäck's 1994 English dissertation looked at the effect of acid precipitation on the needles of pine and spruce and on the cold resistance of trees. The dissertation was titled Effects of acidic Precipitation on Scots pine and Norway spruce needles and their low temperature Tolerance. Bäck has been a docent of plant ecophysiology at the University of Oulu since 1998 and a docent of forest-atmosphere interaction at the University of Helsinki since 2010.

Bäck worked as a researcher at the University of Oulu and the Academy of Finland (1985–1996). After completing her thesis, she was an assistant in plant ecology at the University of Oulu (1995–1998). She was a postdoc researcher at the Academy of Finland (1998–2004). She spent 15 months as a postdoctoral researcher in the United States at Lawrence Livermore National Laboratory in California and Cornell University's Boyce Thompson Institute for Research in New York. She was a researcher at the Department of Forestry at the University of Helsinki (2004–2006) and a research coordinator at the Department of Physics (2007–2012). She has served as a professor of forest-atmosphere interaction since August 2013.

In 2017, Bäck received the Pro Scientia award when it was given by the Finnish Academy of Sciences for the first time. The Prize is awarded for work that "significantly promoted the status of science in society." It is given out every other year and is valued at 10,000 euros.

In 2021 she was named a Knight, First Class, of the Order of the White Rose of Finland.
