= Vuokko Hirvonen =

Finnish Sámi author and professor

- Born: 1955 (age 70–71); Ohcejohka, Finland
- Occupation: Professor

Academic background
- Education: University of Oulu

Academic work
- Discipline: Sámi Literature
- Institutions: Sámi University

Vuokko Hirvonen (born 1955) is an author and professor emeritus of Sámi literature and school research at Sámi University of Applied Sciences. She has written extensively about Sámi women's literature and Sámi teacher education.

== Early life and education ==
Hirvonen is a Finnish citizen and grew up in Ohcejohka, Finland. Her mother was Sámi and her father Finnish, and Finnish was the language used in her home and much of her education. She earned a bachelor's degree in sociology from the University of Tampere in 1979 and worked with local youth in Utsjoki/Ohcejohka before returning to school to study Sámi language and literature at the University of Oulu and the University of Tromsø, earning her master's degree from University of Oulu in 1991. She started working at Sámi University in 1990 and was made an associated professor there in 1993.

In 1999, she defended her doctoral dissertation on Sámi women's literature at the University of Oulu. Sámeeatnama jienat: Sápmelaš nissona bálggis girječállin / Saamenmaan ääniä: Saamelaisen naisen tie kirjailijaksi (Voices from Sápmi: Sámi Women's Path to Authorship) was published in both Northern Sámi and Finnish and is notable for being the first dissertation written in a Sámi language in Finland.

== Academic work ==
In 2007, Hirvonen returned to Sámi University as a professor of Sámi literature. She also focused her research on ethics and education. In 2019, the University of Umeå awarded Hirvonen an honorary doctorate for her significant contributions toward international cooperation in educational research and for bringing the Sámi perspective to indigenous studies, gender studies and post-colonial studies.

Hirvonen also served as a project manager for the Research Council of Norway’s effort to evaluate the Reform 97 comprehensive school reform initiative implemented in July 1997. Hirvonen credited the effort for developing a curricula for Sámi-language instruction; however, she was also critical of the resources provided to ensure true bilingual education in Norwegian and Sámi languages.

In 2017, Hirvonen worked with Kaija Anttonen to translate and publish Sámi-language texts from Finland's first Sámi writer, Pedar Jalvi, into Finnish along with a biography of Jalvi.

== Links ==
- Professor Vuokko Hirvonen is the University of Oulu’s Alumna of the Year 2020, University of Oulu, accessed 2021-05-24
