= Hospital NEO =

Private hospital in Turku and Salo, Finland

Coordinates: 60°26′59″N 22°17′47″E

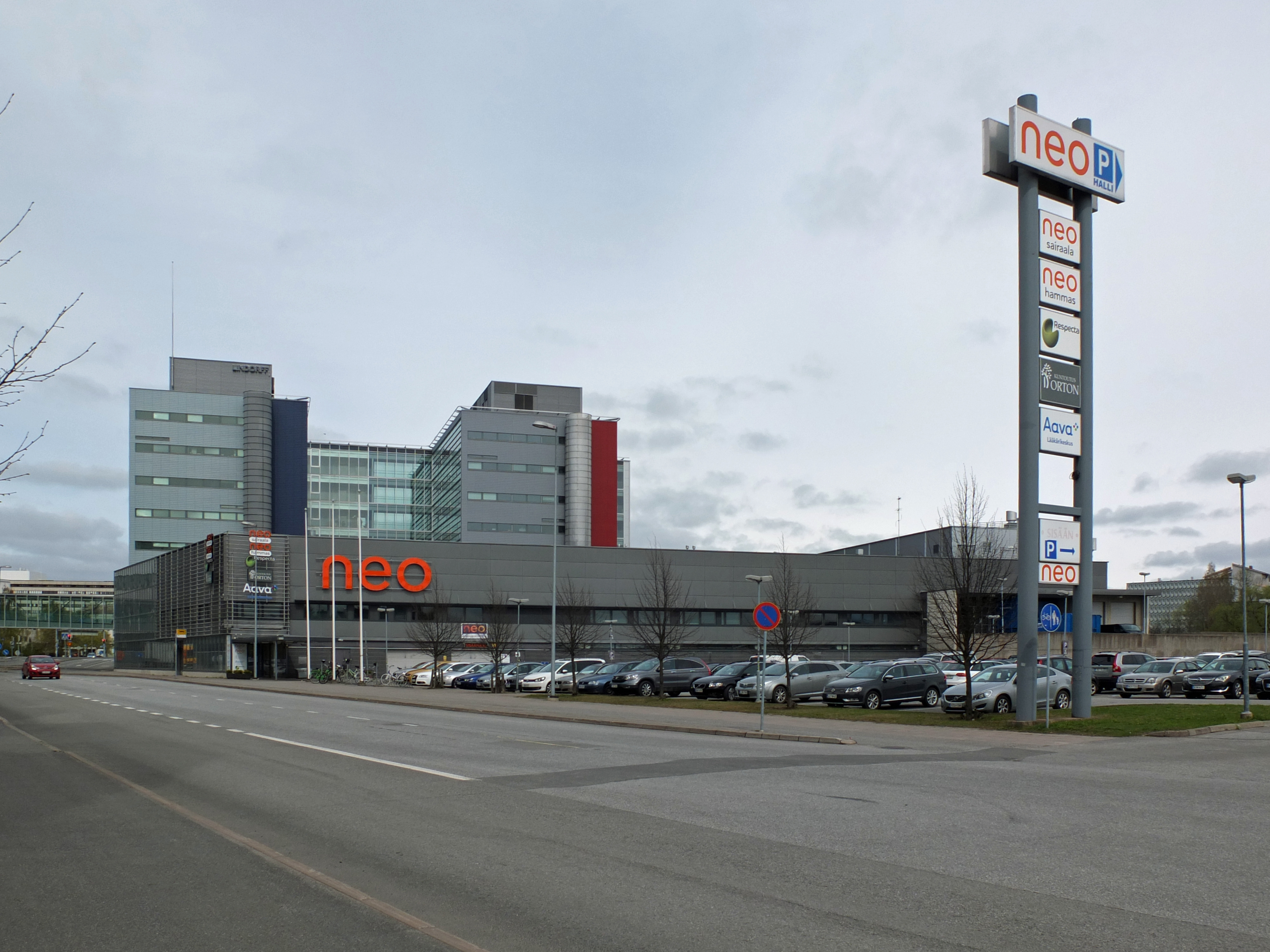
Private medical centre Neo, Turku, Finland. May 2014.

Hospital NEO is a private hospital situated in Turku and Salo, Finland that specializes in orthopedic day surgery and sport medicine. The hospital also focuses in high-quality aesthetic and plastic surgery. The hospital is privately owned. Over 100 health-care professionals are employed by Hospital NEO and approximately 2.000 surgical operations are made in a year (2014).

== History ==
Hospital NEO opened in March 2011. The hospital was officially inaugurated on 1 March 2011, with Finland’s then Minister for Foreign Affairs, Alexander Stubb, cutting the ribbon. Hospital NEO operates in a former commercial building in the Kupittaa district of Turku.

== Ownership ==
Hospital is privately owned. Hospital NEO’s doctors and other staff held 91 percent of the company and a private investor 9 percent.

== Services ==
Hospital NEO specializes in orthopedic day surgery and sport medicine. The hospital also focuses in high-quality aesthetic and plastic surgery.

=== Sports medicine and orthopedics ===
Hospital NEO specializes in the diagnosis and treatment of sports injuries and other musculoskeletal disorders. Many of the problems faced by patients are the result of injuries sustained during amateur and professional sports.

The hospital has dedicated surgeons for shoulder, elbow, hand, knee, ankle, and foot problems, as well as for fractures and tendon injuries. The surgical procedures performed at the hospital primarily require only a one-day stay in the hospital.

=== Plastic surgery and aesthetic treatments ===
NEO Aesthetic in Turku carries out high-quality aesthetic and plastic surgery and various aesthetic procedures and treatments, such as laser and injection therapies and chemical peels.

== Doctors ==
Hospital NEO’s doctors include world-renowned sports medicine surgeon and professor Sakari Orava, who has operated on, among others, soccer player David Beckham and Serbian President Boris Tadić, for torn Achilles tendons. NEO’s other doctors and orthopedic surgeons include neuro and spine surgeon Janek Frantzén, knee and ankle surgeons Jyrki Heinänen, Jussi Rantanen and Juha-Pekka Vuori, shoulder and back surgeon Ilmo Helttula, shoulder and elbow surgeon Terho Kainonen, knee, ankle and tendon surgeons Lasse Lempainen and Janne Sarimo, shoulder surgeon Juha Ranne, hand and elbow surgeon Mark Rawlins, hip surgeon and consultant in joint replacement surgery Matti Seppänen and orthopedic surgeon Katja Virta, who has specialist qualification in hand surgery.
