= Marjo-Riitta Järvelin =

Finnish epidemiologist

- Born: 21 March 1954 (age 72); Sysmä
- Citizenship: Finland
- Education: University of Oulu (PhD 1980); University of London (MSc 1994)
- Scientific career
- Fields: lifecourse epidemiology
- Institutions: Imperial College London; University of Oulu
- Thesis: Childhood Enuresis: An Epidemiological and Aetiological Survey of Seven-Year-Old Children (1980)

Marjo-Riitta Järvelin (born 21 March 1954 in Sysmä, Finland) is a Finnish epidemiologist. Since 2002 she has been professor of lifecourse epidemiology at Imperial College London. She is also part-time professor of public health at the University of Oulu, Finland, and visiting faculty at London's Brunel University.

Järvelin studied at the University of Oulu, receiving her medical degree in 1980 and a Ph.D. in epidemiology in 1989. She qualified as a pediatric specialist in 1987. She has a master's degree from the University of London Environmental Epidemiology and Policy (1994) and became a licensed physician in the UK in 1998.

For more than 25 years Järvelin has conducted public health research based on large populations from northern Finland. Two major resources are the NFBC1966 and NFBC1986 birth cohorts from Northern Finland, which were collected during the years 1965 and 1985 from women attending prenatal examinations. Järvelin has been the scientific director of these birth cohorts for several years. A long follow-up period has enabled a fully-fledged epidemiological programme throughout the life span. Järvelin has studied, among other things, the effects of genetic and early environmental factors on the emergence of multifactorial diseases. She also coordinated the international DynaHEALTH research project (a Horizon 2020 project) focusing on supporting healthier and more active aging and reducing type II diabetes and obesity.

Among the international acknowledgments that she has received for her scientific work, Professor Järvelin was named Finland's Epidemiologist of the Year in 2012. She has been a member of the Finnish Academy of Sciences since 2013.
