= Ousmane Dembélé =

French footballer (born 1997)

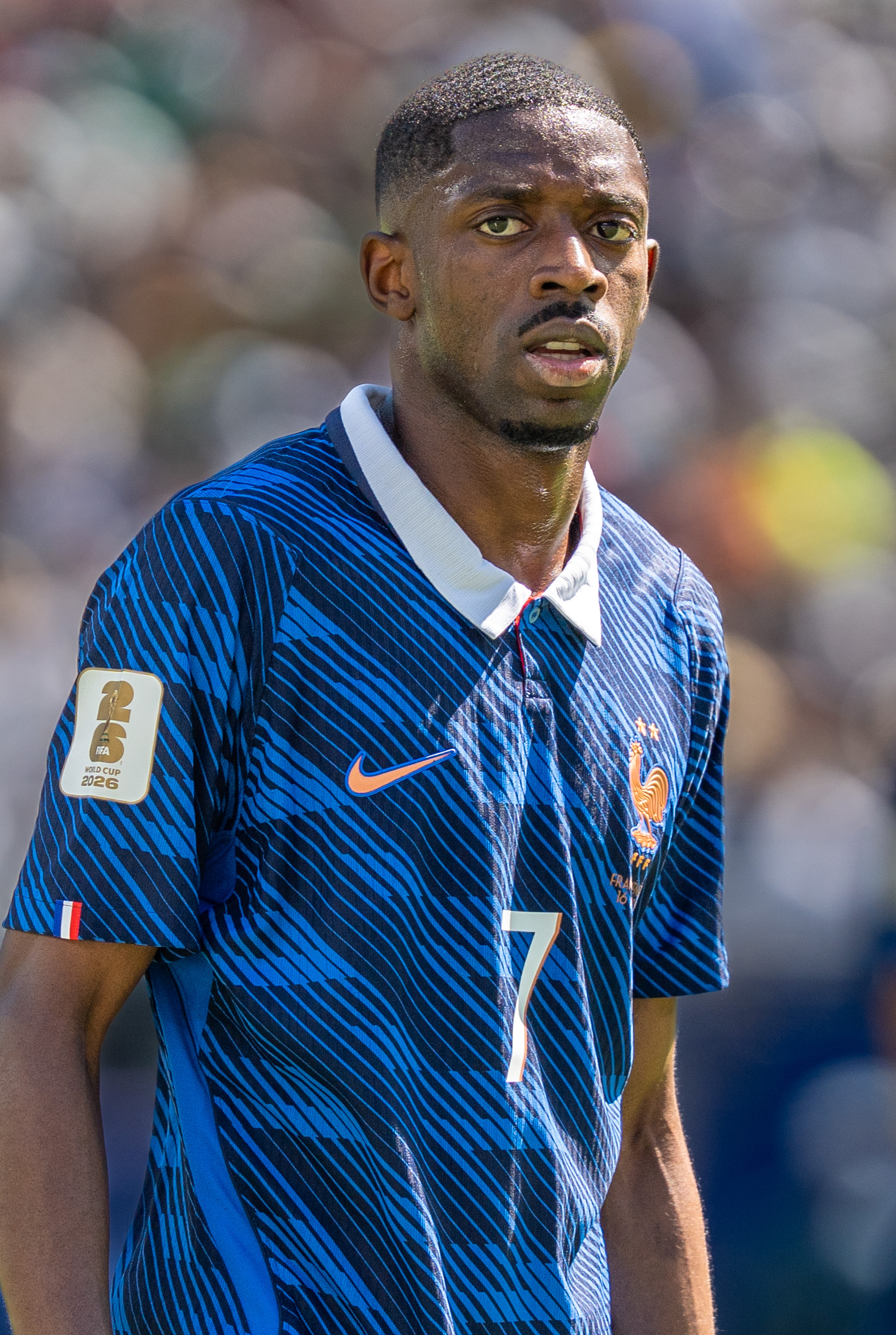
- Dembélé with France in 2026

Personal information
- Full name: Masour Ousmane Dembélé
- Date of birth: 15 May 1997 (age 29)
- Place of birth: Vernon, Eure, France
- Height: 1.78 m (5 ft 10 in)
- Positions: Forward; right winger

Team information
- Current team: Paris Saint-Germain
- Number: 10

Youth career
- 2004–2009: Madeleine Évreux
- 2009–2010: Évreux
- 2010–2014: Rennes

Senior career*
Years	Team	Apps	(Gls)
2014–2015	Rennes II	22	(13)
2015–2016	Rennes	26	(12)
2016–2017	Borussia Dortmund	32	(6)
2017–2023	Barcelona	127	(24)
2023–	Paris Saint-Germain	84	(35)

International career^{‡}
2013–2014	France U17	8	(4)
2014–2015	France U18	5	(0)
2015	France U19	3	(1)
2016	France U21	4	(0)
2016–	France	71	(13)
Medal record
Men's football
Representing France
FIFA World Cup
Winner	2018 Russia
Runner-up	2022 Qatar
UEFA Nations League
Third place	2025 Germany
- * Club domestic league appearances and goals as of 18:18, 21 November 2026 (UTC) ‡ National team caps and goals as of 20:05, 5 October 2026 (UTC)

Masour Ousmane Dembélé (Note: French pronunciation: [usman dɛmbele]) (born 15 May 1997) is a French professional footballer who plays as a forward and right winger for Ligue 1 club Paris Saint-Germain and the France national team. Regarded as one of the best players in the world, he is one of eleven players to have won the FIFA World Cup, UEFA Champions League, and Ballon d'Or during their career.

Dembélé began his professional career at Rennes, where he was named Ligue 1 Young Player of the Year in his one season with the first team. In 2016, he transferred to the German club Borussia Dortmund, winning the DFB-Pokal in his debut season and scoring in the final. Regarded as one of the most promising young talents in world football, he joined the Spanish club Barcelona in 2017 for an initial fee of €105 million, making him at the time the joint-second most expensive player in history, alongside Paul Pogba and behind Neymar. Although Dembélé did not fully meet the expectations placed on him at Barcelona, he won multiple domestic honours with the club, including three La Liga titles, two Copa del Rey titles, and two Supercopa de España titles.

Dembélé returned to France in 2023, signing with Paris Saint-Germain for a fee of €50.4 million. In the 2024–25 season, he experienced a resurgence in his career, contributing 33 goals and 15 assists in 49 appearances as PSG won a continental treble. He was named the Ligue 1 Player of the Year and the 2025 UEFA Champions League Player of the Season, as well as finishing as the Ligue 1 top scorer. His performances earned him the 2025 Ballon d'Or. In the following season, Dembélé was again named the Ligue 1 Player of the Year, and won another Champions League and league title.

After winning 20 caps and scoring five goals at youth level, Dembélé made his senior international debut for France in 2016. He was a member of the France squad that won the 2018 FIFA World Cup, also featuring at UEFA Euro 2020, the 2022 World Cup (finishing as runners-up), Euro 2024, and the 2026 World Cup.

== Early life and career ==
Masour Ousmane Dembélé was born on 15 May 1997 in Vernon, Eure, France. His mother is Mauritanian-Senegalese from Waly Diantang, while his father is Malian. Dembélé began playing football between the ages of 12 and 13 in nearby Évreux, first at ALM Évreux and then at Évreux FC 27.

== Club career ==
=== Rennes ===
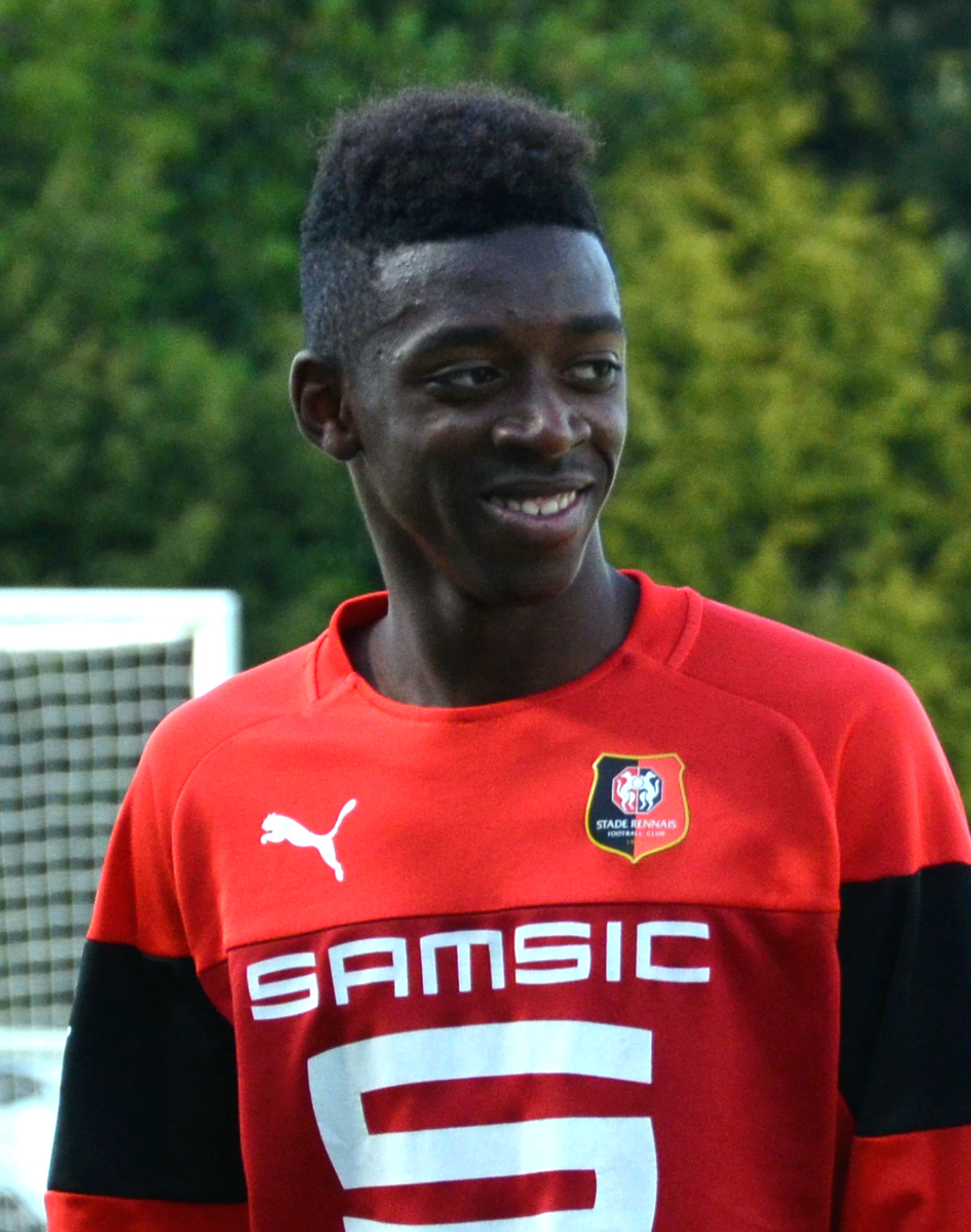
Dembélé with Rennes in 2015

Dembélé made his senior debut for Rennes' reserve team in the Championnat de France Amateur, on 6 September 2014, coming on as a 78th-minute substitute for Zana Allée. He effectively set up Alseny Kourouma for the second goal of a 2–0 home win over the reserve team of Breton rivals Guingamp. On 9 November, he scored his first career goal, again coming off the bench in a game at the Stade de la Piverdière, this time against the reserves of Laval. He totalled 13 goals in 18 games in his first season, including a hat-trick on 16 May 2015 in a 6–1 win over Hérouville.

On 6 November 2015, Dembélé made his professional debut for Rennes' first team in Ligue 1 against Angers, replacing Kamil Grosicki for the last five minutes of the game. On 22 November, he scored his first Ligue 1 goal for the first team against Bordeaux, opening a 2–2 draw at Roazhon Park. On 9 January 2016, Dembélé found the net again for Rennes, as they came from 0–2 down to draw 2–2 against regional rivals Lorient at home. On 6 March, he scored his first Ligue 1 hat-trick in a 4–1 victory over Nantes in the Derby Breton.

On 18 March, he scored his tenth goal of the season in a 5–2 win against Marseille at the Stade Vélodrome. He ended his debut season with twelve goals from 29 matches, after scoring twice in a 3–1 win against Stade Reims on 2 April.

Rennes' sporting director Mikaël Silvestre compared Dembélé to Cristiano Ronaldo, whom he had seen arrive at Manchester United around the same age.

=== Borussia Dortmund ===
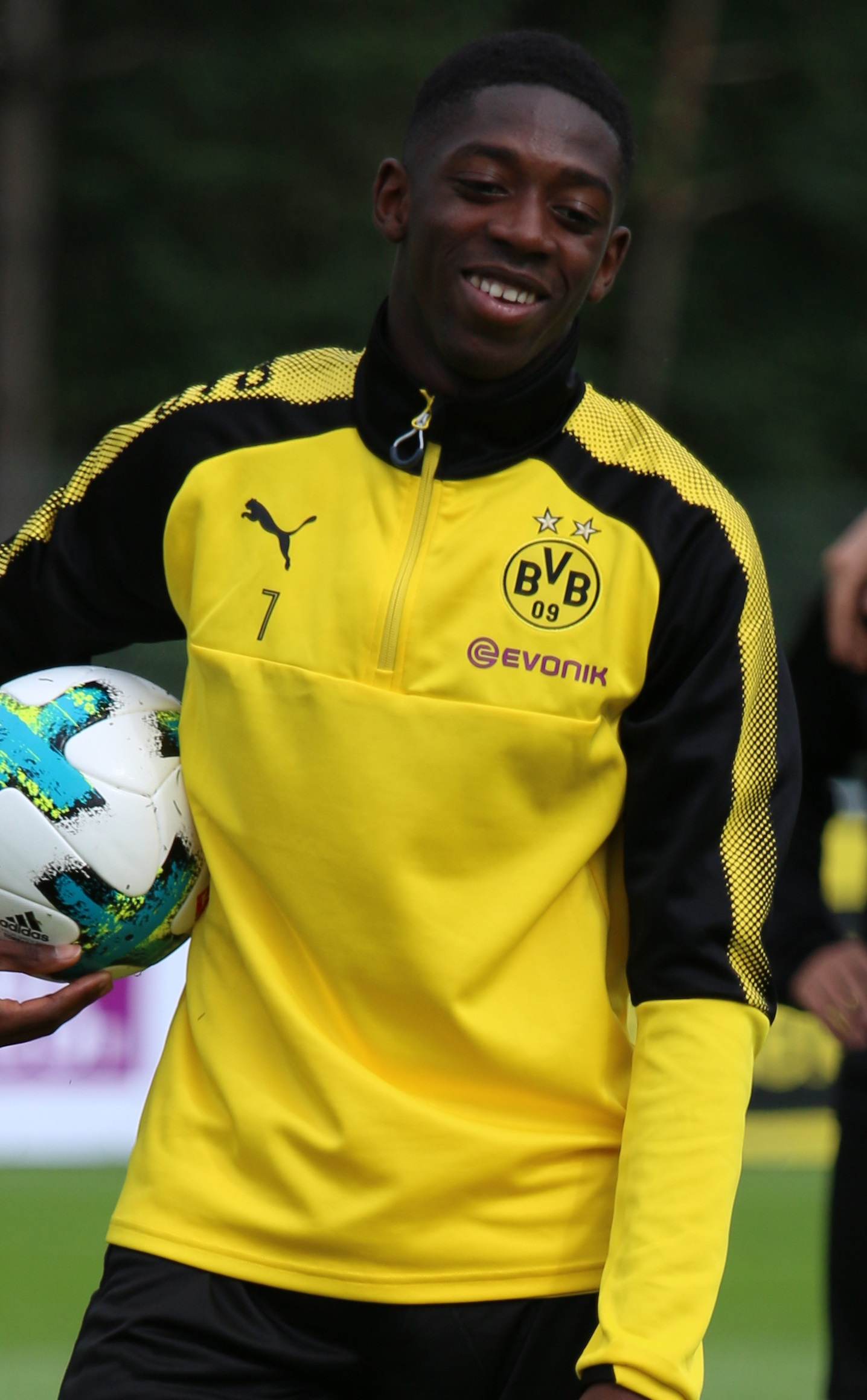
Dembele training with Borussia Dortmund in 2017

On 12 May 2016, Dembélé signed a five-year contract with German club Borussia Dortmund, effective 1 July. On 14 August, he made his debut in a 2–0 defeat against Bayern Munich in the DFL-Supercup. He scored his first goal for Dortmund on 20 September, in a Bundesliga encounter against VfL Wolfsburg, which Dortmund won 5–1 at the Volkswagen Arena. On 22 November, he scored the first Champions League goal of his career as the German club defeated Legia Warsaw 8–4 in a group stage meeting.

On 26 April 2017, in the DFB-Pokal semi-final against Bayern Munich, Dembélé assisted Pierre-Emerick Aubameyang's 69th-minute equaliser and scored the winning goal in the 74th minute, helping Dortmund reach the 2017 DFB-Pokal Final. On 27 May, in the decisive match against Eintracht Frankfurt at the Berlin Olympiastadion, he scored the first goal of a 2–1 victory as Dortmund clinched their first major title in five years. Dembélé was subsequently named man of the match.

After scoring six goals and recording 13 assists during 2016–17, Dembélé was named to the Bundesliga Team of the Season and awarded the league's Rookie of the Season award.

=== Barcelona ===
On 25 August 2017, La Liga side Barcelona announced that they had reached an agreement to sign Dembélé for €105 million plus a reported €40 million add-ons. On 28 August, he had his medical and signed a five-year contract, with his buyout clause set at €400 million. Barcelona had sold Neymar to Paris Saint-Germain (PSG) for €222 million, so the deal meant that Dembélé became the joint-second most expensive player (in euros), along with Paul Pogba. Rennes received a reported €20 million from Borussia Dortmund as a result of the sale, and Évreux 27 were also due part of the fee. He was handed the number 11 shirt previously worn by Neymar.

==== 2017–18: First season and domestic double ====
Dembélé made his debut on 9 September as a 68th-minute substitute for Gerard Deulofeu in a 5–0 Derbi barceloní win over Espanyol at the Camp Nou, assisting the final goal by Luis Suárez. In his first league start eight days later at Getafe, he injured his hamstring and was ruled out for four months. He was given the medical all-clear on 2 January 2018, but a couple weeks later, he again injured himself against Real Sociedad and was ruled out for up to four weeks.

On 14 March 2018, Dembélé scored his first goal for Barcelona, netting the second goal in a 3–0 second leg win in the Champions League round of 16 against Chelsea. On 17 April, he scored his first La Liga goal, the opening goal in an eventual 2–2 draw with Celta Vigo. On 9 May, Dembélé scored twice, marking the first brace of his Barcelona career, in a 5–1 home victory over Villarreal. Dembélé won both the Copa del Rey and La Liga winners' medals in his first season in Spain, with the 20-year-old scoring four goals in 24 appearances across all competitions.

==== 2018–19: Supercopa de España and second La Liga title ====
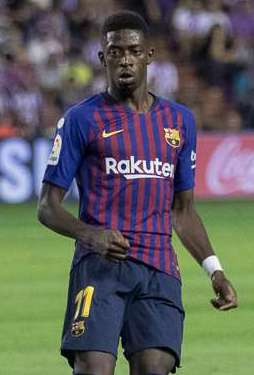
Dembélé playing for Barcelona in 2018

On 12 August 2018, Dembélé scored the winning goal against Sevilla in the Supercopa de España, in an eventual 2–1 victory to win Barcelona their 13th Supercopa de España title. He opened his La Liga season's goal tally by scoring the only goal of the game against Real Valladolid, on 25 August, away at the Estadio José Zorrilla. On 18 September, Dembélé scored his first Champions League goal of the season, helping Barcelona beat PSV 4–0 at the Camp Nou. On 4 November, he inspired Barcelona to a 3–2 comeback away against Rayo Vallecano, scoring the 2–2 equaliser with a half-volley in the 87th minute. On 11 December, he scored a remarkable solo goal against Tottenham Hotspur outpacing many defenders, finishing with a cool left footed shot past Hugo Lloris. He won the UEFA Champions League Goal of the Week for that goal. After the match, Barcelona manager Ernesto Valverde praised the youngster, saying "He has made a great goal, within reach of players with his talent." He finished the season with 14 goals, 8 of them in the league, as his club managed to win another La Liga title.

==== 2019–21: Recurring injuries ====
Dembélé injured his left hamstring in the opening match of the 2019–20 La Liga season, a 0–1 defeat against Athletic Bilbao, and was expected to miss five weeks. He returned as a half-time substitute in Barcelona's 2–1 home win over Villarreal on 24 September. He scored his first goal of the season in a 4–0 win over Sevilla on 6 October, but was later sent off for dissent. On 27 November, in a Champions League group match against his former club Borussia Dortmund, Dembélé suffered an injury which led to his substitution after 24 minutes. It was later confirmed by Barcelona that he would miss the following ten weeks with a thigh injury.

In February 2020, on his return to training, he suffered a serious hamstring tear which ended his season.

Dembélé returned to the field for the first time in ten months as a 70th-minute substitute for Ansu Fati in Barcelona's La Liga fixture against Villarreal on 27 September 2020. He scored his first goal in 380 days in the team's first Champions League fixture of the season against Ferencváros on 20 October.

==== 2021–23: Hamstring surgery and La Liga assist leader ====
Dembélé suffered a hamstring injury when playing with France national team in the delayed UEFA Euro 2020 in 2021. His injury required surgery, and was operated on in Turku, Finland, by surgeon Lasse Lempainen in late June 2021. Dembélé was also operated on by Lempainen and Sakari Orava in 2017 and 2020.

On 10 May 2022, Dembélé provided two assists in a 3–1 home victory over Celta Vigo. It was his 10th and 11th league assists in 2022. He finished the 2021–22 La Liga season as the league's top playmaker with thirteen assists.

On 14 July 2022, Dembélé extended his contract with Barcelona until 30 June 2024. His release clause was set to €50 million, and later raised to €100 million on 1 August 2023.

=== Paris Saint-Germain ===
==== 2023–24: First season in Paris and domestic double ====
On 12 August 2023, Dembélé joined Ligue 1 club Paris Saint-Germain on a contract until June 2028, for a fee of €50.4 million. He was initially assigned the number 23 jersey, but switched to the number 10 following Neymar's departure from the club.

On 20 August, Dembélé made his PSG debut, coming on as a substitute in a 1–1 draw away to Toulouse. On 24 September, he got his first goal involvement for PSG, providing the assist for Gonçalo Ramos's first goal in a 4–0 Le Classique win over Marseille. On 24 November, Dembélé scored his first goal for the club in a 5–2 win at home over Monaco. On 10 April 2024, he scored his first Champions League goal with PSG in a 3–2 home defeat against his former club Barcelona in the quarter-final first leg. In the second leg six days later, he scored PSG's first goal in a 4–1 away victory, helping secure his club's qualification to the semi-finals and taking home the player of the match award. At the end of the 2023–24 season, Dembélé won the Ligue 1 title with PSG. He also scored the opening goal in PSG's 2–1 win over Lyon in the 2024 Coupe de France final.

==== 2024–25: Continental treble win and individual accolades ====
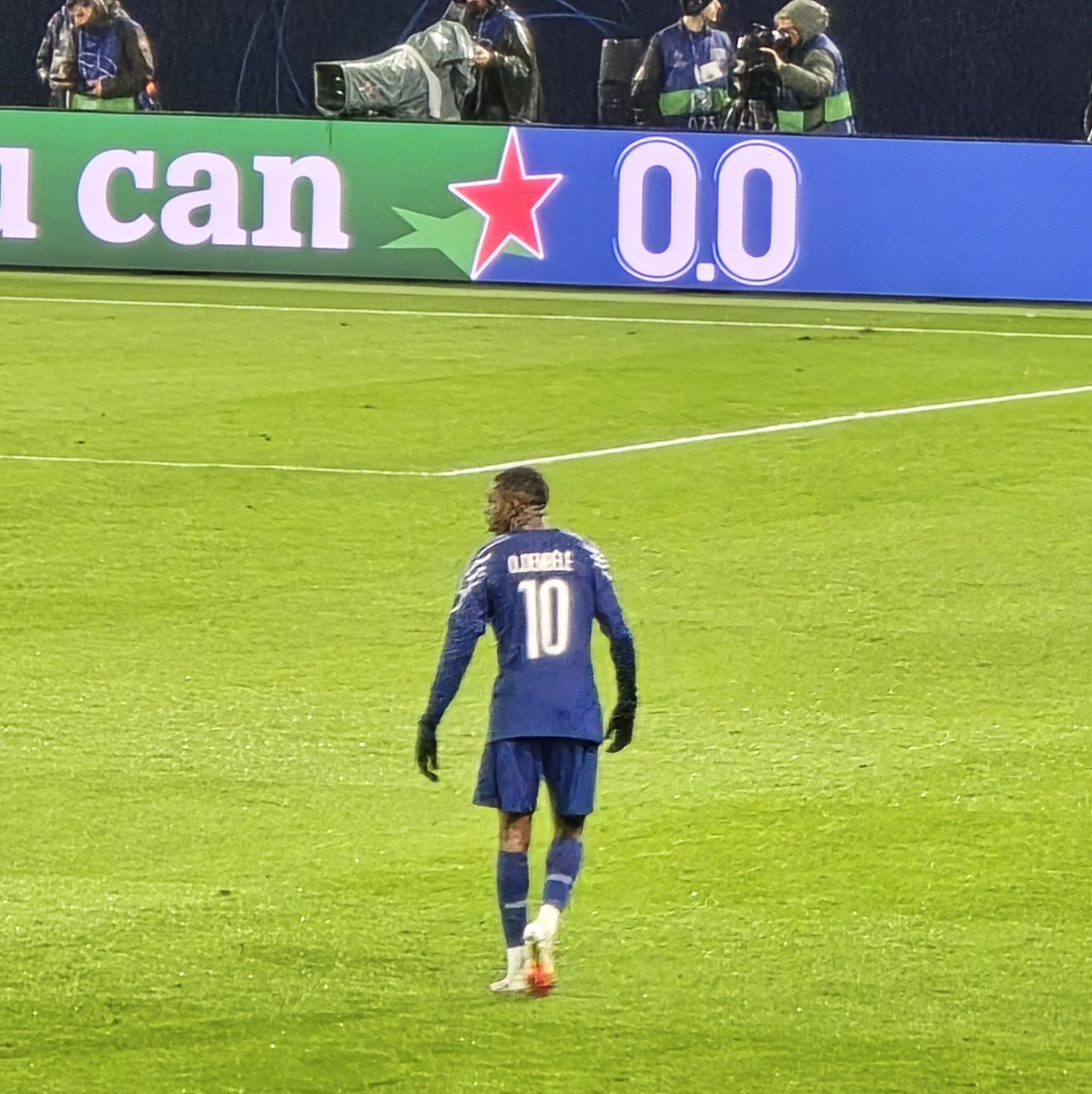
Dembélé playing for Paris Saint-Germain in 2025

On 5 January 2025, Dembélé scored a stoppage-time winner as PSG defeated Monaco 1–0 in the 2024 Trophée des Champions. On 22 January, he scored Paris's first goal in a 4–2 comeback victory over Manchester City in the Champions League. On 29 January, he scored a hat-trick in a 4–1 Champions League victory over VfB Stuttgart, his second career hat-trick and first in European competitions, helping PSG qualify to the knockout phase play-offs. Three days later, Dembélé scored another hat-trick in a 5–2 league win away to Brest, becoming the first PSG player to have scored consecutive hat-tricks in official matches. In the second leg of the Champions League round of 16 on 11 March, Dembélé scored the equalizing goal on aggregate against Liverpool. He scored in the ensuing penalty shoot-out as PSG advanced to the quarterfinals. On 29 April, he scored PSG's only goal in a 1–0 away win over Arsenal in the Champions League semi-finals first leg. He assisted Achraf Hakimi's goal in the second leg, helping PSG advance to the final with a 2–1 home victory and setting a new record for the most goal contributions by a player at a French club in a single Champions League campaign, with twelve.

Dembélé ended the season as joint-top scorer in Ligue 1 with 21 goals, having helped PSG to their 13th league title. He was also named the Ligue 1 Player of the Year for the first time, and was included in the Ligue 1 Team of the Year. On 31 May 2025, Dembélé won the Champions League after PSG beat Inter Milan 5–0 in the final, a match in which he provided two assists. After the final, his statistics for the season were of 33 goals and 15 assists in 49 appearances in all competitions, leading to him being cited as one of the leading candidates for the 2025 Ballon d'Or, which he ultimately won. At the 2025 FIFA Club World Cup, after missing the group stage due to injury, Dembélé scored a goal in a 2–0 win over Bayern Munich in the quarter-finals and recorded a goal and assist in a 4–0 win over Real Madrid in the semi-finals. PSG went on to finish as runners-up following a 3–0 final defeat to Chelsea.

==== 2025–26: Back-to-back Champions League titles ====
Dembélé won the UEFA Super Cup with PSG on 13 August, scoring in a 4–3 penalty shoot-out after a 2–2 draw against Tottenham Hotspur. His stoppage-time assist for Gonçalo Ramos's header and his successful penalty in the shoot-out were among the contributions that earned him the Player of the Match award. On 30 August 2025, Dembélé scored his first two goals of the season, two penalties in a 6–3 win away to Toulouse, but while on international duty in early September, he suffered a hamstring injury that would keep him out of action for six weeks. That same month, he won the 2025 Ballon d'Or.

On 22 October, Dembélé returned from injury for PSG, scoring in a 7–2 victory over Bayer Leverkusen in the Champions League. On 4 November, in a match against Bayern Munich, he suffered another injury, this time to the calf, keeping him out of action for "several weeks." On 16 December, Dembélé was named The Best FIFA Men's Player of the year. On 8 January 2026, he scored a goal in a 2–2 draw against Marseille in the 2025 Trophée des Champions, an eventual victory on penalties for PSG. On 14 April, he scored twice in a 2–0 away victory against Liverpool in the Champions League quarter-final second leg, sealing progression to the semi-finals with a 4–0 aggregate win.

On 11 May, Dembélé was named the UNFP Ligue 1 Player of the Year for the second consecutive season. He became only the fifth player in the history of the award to win in back-to-back years, joining a list that includes Zlatan Ibrahimović and Kylian Mbappé. Despite a season interrupted by injuries, he finished the domestic campaign with 10 goals and 6 assists, playing a pivotal role in Paris Saint-Germain securing their 12th league title in 14 years. Later that month, on 30 May, he scored the equalising penalty in a 1–1 draw against Arsenal in the UEFA Champions League final, before Paris Saint-Germain prevailed 4–3 in the penalty shootout to retain the trophy.

== International career ==
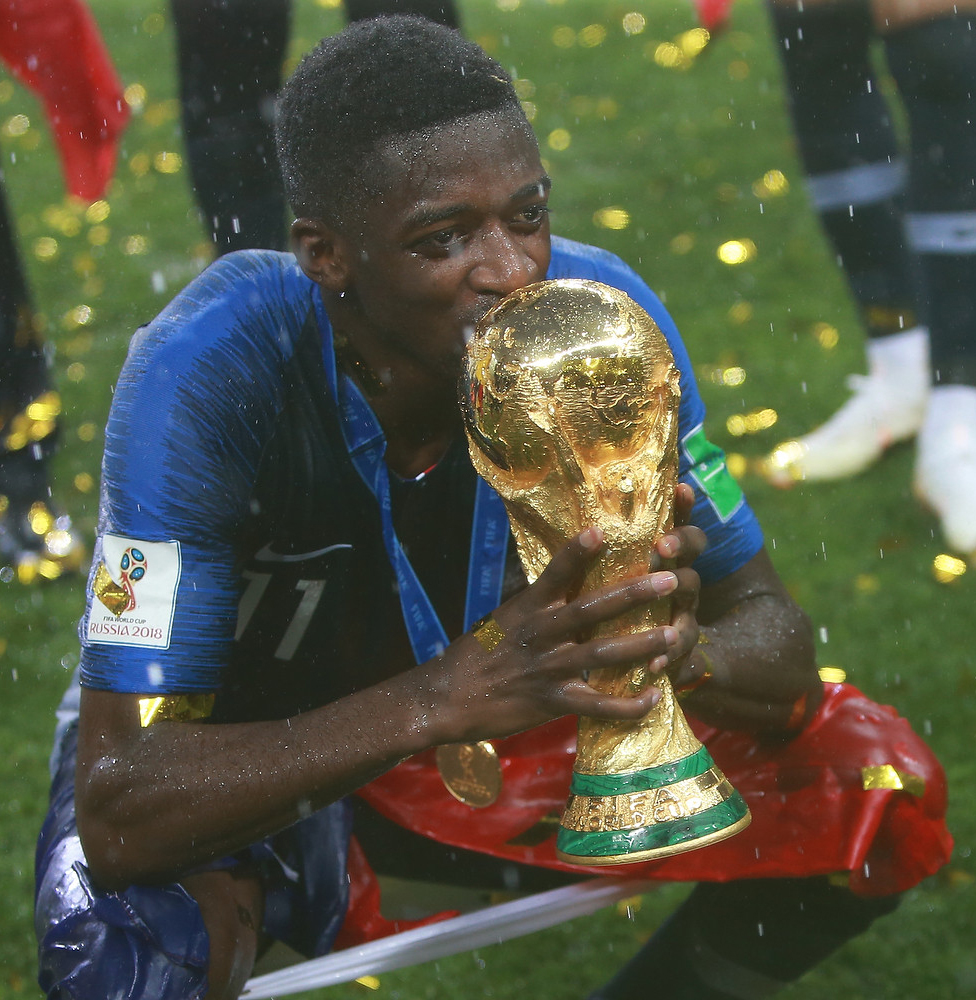
Dembélé after winning the 2018 FIFA World Cup with France

Dembélé was called up to the senior France squad for the first time in August 2016 to face Italy and Belarus in friendlies after Alexandre Lacazette and Nabil Fekir withdrew through injury. He made his debut on 1 September against the former at the Stadio San Nicola, replacing Antoine Griezmann for the final 27 minutes of a 3–1 win. On 13 June 2017, Dembélé scored his first goal for France in a 3–2 friendly victory against England.

On 17 May 2018, Dembélé was named in the 23-man French squad for the 2018 FIFA World Cup in Russia. He featured in four matches during the tournament, including all group stage matches and appearing as a late substitute in the quarter-final against Uruguay. On 15 July, he was an unused substitute as France beat Croatia 4–2 in the final.

On 18 May 2021, Dembélé was selected in the French squad for the postponed UEFA Euro 2020. In the second group stage match against Hungary, he sustained a rupture of the right hamstring tendon at the knee level which ruled him out for the remainder of the tournament.

Dembélé was called up to the French squad for the 2022 FIFA World Cup in Qatar, where he played all games as France finished the tournament as runner-ups. Dembélé started the final but conceded a penalty in the first half and was substituted in the 41st minute.

On 18 November 2023, Dembélé scored a goal in a 14–0 win over Gibraltar during the UEFA Euro 2024 qualifying, which was the largest win in the history of the France national team. At the final tournament in Germany, he was named man of the match in France's quarter-final victory against Portugal.

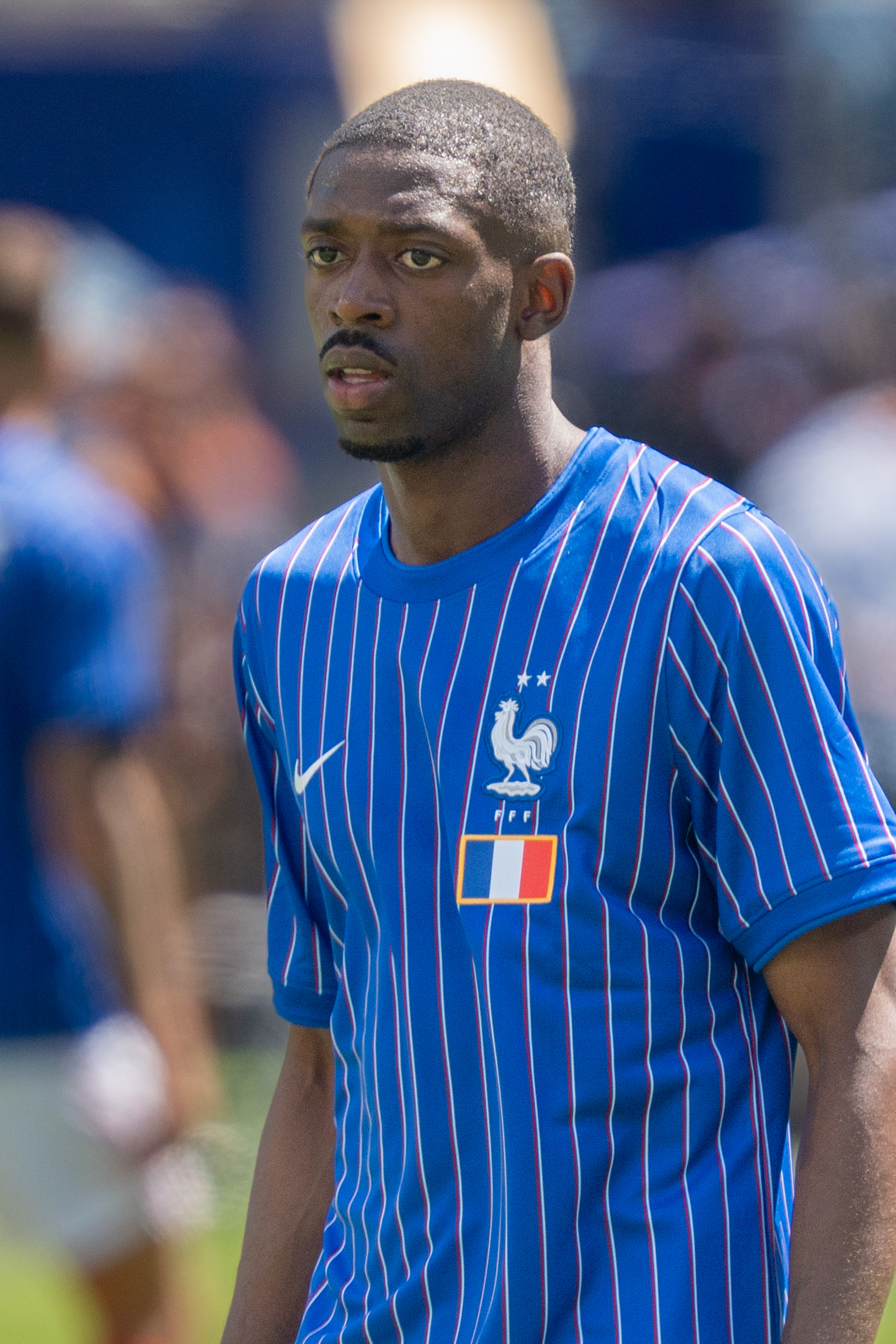
Dembélé with France at the 2026 FIFA World Cup

On 14 May 2026, Dembélé was selected in the 26-man squad for the 2026 FIFA World Cup. In France's second group match on 22 June, he assisted Kylian Mbappé's second goal and later scored his team's third in a 3–0 victory over Iraq, which saw his side qualify for the knockout stages. On 26 June, Dembélé scored a hat-trick and was named Man of the Match in a 4–1 victory against Norway in the final group stage match, becoming the third French player to achieve this feat after Just Fontaine and Kylian Mbappé. In addition, he became the first player to score a first-half hat-trick since Oleg Salenko in 1994 and the second-fastest hat-trick from the start of the match after Erich Probst in 1954. In the round of 32 on 30 June, he set-up Mbappé's first goal in a 3–0 win over Sweden. In the quarter-finals against Morocco, he scored in a 2–0 victory, reaching five goals in a single World Cup edition and becoming only the third French player to achieve the feat after Just Fontaine and Kylian Mbappé. While Dembele scored in the third-place match against England, the French lost the match 4–6.

== Player profile ==
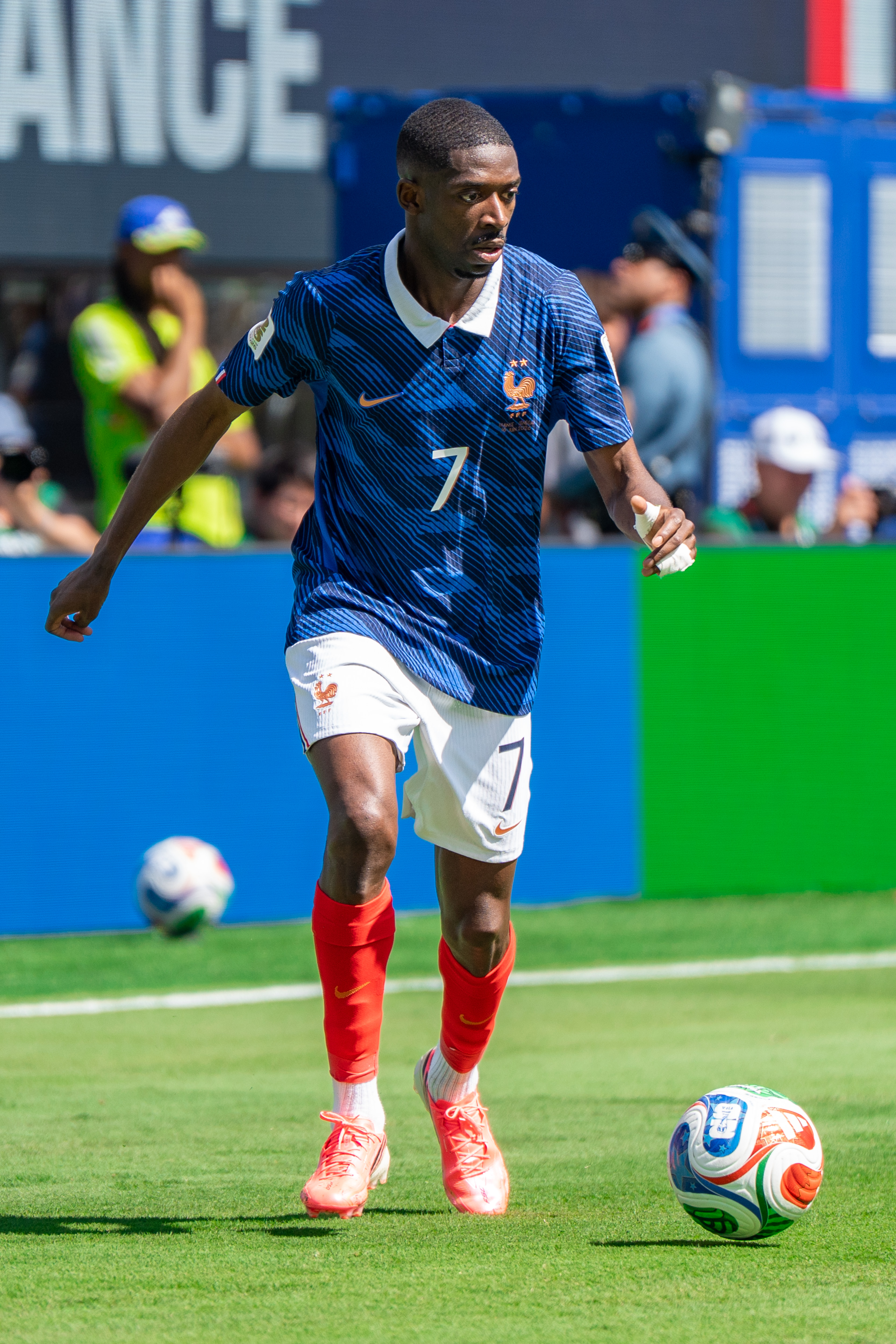
Dembélé playing for France at the 2026 FIFA World Cup

Dembélé is a winger who can play on either flank, due to his ability to use both feet, and to utilise his technical ability, speed, and agility in order to get past opponents or beat defenders in one-on-one situations. Dembélé can also operate as a left or right-sided attacking midfielder in a 4–4–2 or 3–5–2 formation. His clinical finishing and eye for goal also allow him to be deployed in a more offensive role as a striker. Dembélé also has great quality in terms of his shooting ability from distance.

Often described as one of the best players in the world, Dembélé has received praise from former team captain Andrés Iniesta for his game-changing qualities. He is well known for his ability to use either foot; a highly skilful player, his dribbling skills and ability to perform elaborate moves allow him to cut through from the left or right wing in order to score or create goalscoring opportunities for his teammates. The Frenchman is also an excellent crosser of the ball; moreover, his creativity is exceptional when in possession. Furthermore, his pace and intelligent runs make him a major offensive threat during counterattacks.

== Personal life ==
=== Religion ===
Dembélé is a Muslim and observes Ramadan, which requires him to fast from dawn until sunset for roughly a month, including on training and match days.

=== Marriage and family ===
In 2021, Dembélé married a Moroccan woman in a traditional Moroccan ceremony in France. They have a daughter, born in September 2022. Dembélé's fatherhood has been credited with him settling down, as he was previously one of Barcelona's most-fined players due to disciplinary issues.

=== Criticism ===
In July 2021, video footage of Dembélé and teammate Antoine Griezmann circulated online, in which Dembélé makes racial comments towards Japanese technicians in his hotel room. As the technicians appear to be troubleshooting the room's television, Dembélé says to Griezmann in French: "All these ugly faces, just so you can play PES, aren't you ashamed? ... What the fuckin language?". As the video zooms in on the technicians' faces, Dembélé laughs and comments, "Are you technologically advanced in your country or not?".

== Career statistics ==
=== Club ===
As of match played 21 November 2026

Appearances and goals by club, season and competition
Club	Season	League			National cup (Note: Includes Coupe de France, DFB-Pokal, Copa del Rey)		League cup (Note: Includes Coupe de la Ligue)		Europe		Other		Total	
Club	Season	Division	Apps	Goals	Apps	Goals	Apps	Goals	Apps	Goals	Apps	Goals	Apps	Goals
Rennes II	2014–15	CFA2	18	13	—		—		—		—		18	13
Rennes II	2015–16	CFA2	4	0	—		—		—		—		4	0
Rennes II	Total		22	13	—		—		—		—		22	13
Rennes	2015–16	Ligue 1	26	12	2	0	1	0	—		—		29	12
Borussia Dortmund	2016–17	Bundesliga	32	6	6	2	—		10 (Note: Appearances in UEFA Champions League)	2	1 (Note: Appearance in DFL-Supercup)	0	49	10
Borussia Dortmund	2017–18	Bundesliga	0	0	0	0	—		—		1	0	1	0
Borussia Dortmund	Total		32	6	6	2	—		10	2	2	0	50	10
Barcelona	2017–18	La Liga	17	3	3	0	—		3	1	—		23	4
Barcelona	2018–19	La Liga	29	8	4	2	—		8	3	1 (Note: Appearance(s) in Supercopa de España)	1	42	14
Barcelona	2019–20	La Liga	5	1	0	0	—		4	0	0	0	9	1
Barcelona	2020–21	La Liga	30	6	6	2	—		6	3	2	0	44	11
Barcelona	2021–22	La Liga	21	1	1	1	—		9 (Note: Three appearances in UEFA Champions League, six appearances in UEFA Europa League)	0	1	0	32	2
Barcelona	2022–23	La Liga	25	5	2	2	—		6	1	2	0	35	8
Barcelona	Total		127	24	16	7	—		36	8	6	1	185	40
Paris Saint-Germain	2023–24	Ligue 1	26	3	4	1	—		11	2	1 (Note: Appearance in Trophée des Champions)	0	42	6
Paris Saint-Germain	2024–25	Ligue 1	29	21	4	3	—		15	8	5 (Note: One appearance and one goal in Trophée des Champions, four appearances and two goals in FIFA Club World Cup)	3	53	35
Paris Saint-Germain	2025–26	Ligue 1	22	10	2	1	—		13	8	3 (Note: One appearance in UEFA Super Cup, one appearance in FIFA Intercontinental Cup, one appearance and one goal in Trophée des Champions)	1	40	20
Paris Saint-Germain	2026–27	Ligue 1	6	1	0	0	—		3	3	2 (Note: One appearance in UEFA Super Cup, one appearance in Trophée des Champions)	0	11	4
Paris Saint-Germain	Total		84	35	10	5	—		41	21	11	4	146	65
Career total			291	90	34	14	1	0	88	31	19	5	433	141

=== International ===
As of match played 5 October 2026

Appearances and goals by national team and year
National team	Year	Apps	Goals
France	2016	3	0
France	2017	4	1
France	2018	14	1
France	2019	0	0
France	2020	0	0
France	2021	6	2
France	2022	8	0
France	2023	7	1
France	2024	11	1
France	2025	4	1
France	2026	14	6
Total		71	13

As of match played 5 October 2026
Scores and results list France's goal tally first, score column indicates score after each Dembélé goal

List of international goals scored by Ousmane Dembélé
No.	Date	Venue	Cap	Opponent	Score	Result	Competition	Ref.
1	13 June 2017	Stade de France, Saint-Denis, France	7	England	3–2	3–2	Friendly	
2	1 June 2018	Allianz Riviera, Nice, France	11	Italy	3–1	3–1	Friendly	
3	28 March 2021	Astana Arena, Nur-Sultan, Kazakhstan	23	Kazakhstan	1–0	2–0	2022 FIFA World Cup qualification	
4	2 June 2021	Allianz Riviera, Nice, France	24	Wales	3–0	3–0	Friendly	
5	18 November 2023	Allianz Riviera, Nice, France	41	Gibraltar	10–0	14–0	UEFA Euro 2024 qualifying	
6	9 September 2024	Parc Olympique Lyonnais, Lyon, France	51	Belgium	2–0	2–0	2024–25 UEFA Nations League A	
7	23 March 2025	Stade de France, Saint-Denis, France	55	Croatia	2–0	2–0 (a.e.t.) (5–4 p)	2024–25 UEFA Nations League A	
8	22 June 2026	Lincoln Financial Field, Philadelphia, United States	61	Iraq	3–0	3–0	2026 FIFA World Cup	
9	26 June 2026	Gillette Stadium, Foxborough, United States	62	Norway	1–0	4–1	2026 FIFA World Cup	
10	26 June 2026	Gillette Stadium, Foxborough, United States	62	Norway	2–0	4–1	2026 FIFA World Cup	
11	26 June 2026	Gillette Stadium, Foxborough, United States	62	Norway	3–1	4–1	2026 FIFA World Cup	
12	9 July 2026	Gillette Stadium, Foxborough, United States	65	Morocco	2–0	2–0	2026 FIFA World Cup	
13	18 July 2026	Hard Rock Stadium, Miami Gardens, United States	67	England	4–5	4–6	2026 FIFA World Cup	

== Honours ==
Borussia Dortmund

- DFB-Pokal: 2016–17

Barcelona

- La Liga: 2017–18, 2018–19, 2022–23
- Copa del Rey: 2017–18, 2020–21
- Supercopa de España: 2018, 2023

Paris Saint-Germain

- Ligue 1: 2023–24, 2024–25, 2025–26
- Coupe de France: 2023–24, 2024–25
- Trophée des Champions: 2023, 2024, 2025
- UEFA Champions League: 2024–25, 2025–26
- UEFA Super Cup: 2025, 2026
- FIFA Intercontinental Cup: 2025
- FIFA Club World Cup runner-up: 2025

France

- FIFA World Cup: 2018; runner-up: 2022
- UEFA Nations League third place: 2024–25

Individual

- Ballon d'Or: 2025
- The Best FIFA Men's Player: 2025
- Globe Soccer Awards Men's Player of the Year Award: 2025
- Ligue 1 Young Player of the Year: 2015–16
- UNFP Ligue 1 Player of the Month: March 2016, January 2025
- UEFA Champions League Team of the Season: 2024–25, 2025–26
- UEFA Champions League Player of the Season: 2024–25
- UEFA Champions League Breakthrough XI: 2016
- Bundesliga Rookie of the Season: 2016–17
- Bundesliga Team of the Season: 2016–17
- VDV Newcomer of the Season: 2016–17
- La Liga top assist provider: 2021–22
- Ligue 1 Team of the Year: 2023–24, 2024–25, 2025–26
- Ligue 1 top assist provider: 2023–24 (shared)
- Ligue 1 Player of the Year: 2024–25, 2025–26
- Ligue 1 Goal of the Year: 2025–26
- Ligue 1 top goalscorer: 2024–25
- FIFPRO World 11: 2025
- FIFA Men's World 11: 2025
- IFFHS World's Best Player: 2025
- IFFHS Men's World Team: 2025

Orders

- Knight of the Legion of Honour: 2018
