= The Dibidogs =

- Official logo and dog characters Rocky, Emmy and Missy
- Created by: Mikaela Solatie; Tom Solatie; Tuija Lehtinen; Futurecode Oy; BlueArc Animation Studios
- Countries of origin: Finland; China
- No. of episodes: 26

Production
- Running time: 23 minutes

Original release
- Network: MTV3, MTV3 Junior (Finland); CCTV-14 (China)
- Release: 2010 – 2012

The Dibidogs (Chinese: 迪比狗) is an animated television series originated from children's ideas and developed with cooperation between Finnish and Chinese producers. The idea of the series is to build a world of children's creativity where participants are welcomed all over the world.

The Dibidogs has been broadcast since 2010. In Finland, it was shown on MTV3 and MTV Juniori (Junior). It has gained over 50 million viewers worldwide in 28 countries, mostly in Asia.

It was later reported in 2017 that The Dibidogs would be continued. A trailer was released in early 2019 and production was stated to start, however it got cancelled. In late 2019, a second trailer was released and production was started in early 2020, but was cancelled due to COVID-19 pandemic.

== Synopsis ==
Dibidogs live on a colourful planet called Bonecity, a futuristic canine paradise. Everything is designed by and for dogs. For instance, buildings and mobile phones are in the shape of bones. They travel by spaceships, occasionally visiting neighbouring planets. The children's school is next to the king's palace.

== Creation ==
The Dibidogs were originated by Finnish creativity teacher Jim Solatie and his family.

In the summer of 2005, on a road trip to the Grand Canyon with their parents, Mikaela and Tom Solatie were doodling and came up with some amusing dog images, which they called Dibidogs.

A year later their father Jim Solatie read that, in order to support domestic animation productions, the Chinese government had blocked foreign-made children's programs from running during primetime on Chinese TV channels. Solatie began to consider the possibility of creating a Chinese animation series from the Dibidogs figures.

Solatie negotiated with dozens of animation studios in China before forming a partnership with BlueArc Animation Studios in Guangzhou. Its directors were fascinated by the series's plot and the concept of characters being developed from children's ideas. Many of the series' visual elements originated from children's creativity workshops organized by BlueArc in China. For instance, the design of Dibidogs planet was based on a boy's drawing.

== Characters ==
Rocky
(Chinese: 阿迪) The main character. A schoolboy with a wild streak. He has red hair and collar. His dad is a spaceship pilot, his mom is a librarian and his poetic older brother is studying to be a sewer inspector.
Emmy
(Chinese: 豆豆公主) : Rocky's classmate and the king's younger daughter is smart, emotional, and hates being treated as a royal.
Missy
(Chinese: 咪咪) Rocky and Emmy's classmate is obsessed with polka-dotted ribbons.
Princess Lizzy
(Real name: Cecilia / Chinese: 茜茜公) The king's older daughter loves being admired as a beautiful princess.
The King
(Chinese: 国王) The benevolent ruler of the Dibidog planet is genuinely concerned about each of his subjects.
The Shadows
(Chinese: 影子们) Mysterious dark figures whose true character is only revealed towards the end of the first season.
The Cactus Cats
(Chinese: 仙人掌猫来自) Natives of a neighbouring planet, often seen with mice tails under their arms.
The Moon Wolves
(Chinese: 月亮狼) Muscular relatives from another nearby planet.

== Awards ==
- In 2010 MIPTV festival in Cannes, France, the Dibidogs and its Finnish production company Futurecode were finalists for two awards, the MipJunior Kid's Jury and MipCOM Global Licensing.
- In 2011, the series won the MIPTV CC Ventures award. This prize for the year's most creative work is chosen by private equity investors.
- In 2014, the Dibidogs won the Finnish audiovisual export Hulda award, granted by the Finnish Film & Audiovisual Export organization (Favex).

== Related products ==
- Dibitales, an iPad app for children to create their own 3D movies with the Dibidogs characters.
- Augmented reality (AR) technology has been integrated into Dibidogs books and children's clothing. With a web camera pointed at a marker, children can interact with the characters on the screen.
