= Jeffrey Elam =

American chemist and researcher

- Education: Cornell University (BA), University of Chicago (PhD)
- Known for: Atomic layer deposition
- Title: Distinguished Fellow, Senior Chemist and Group Leader
- Scientific career
- Fields: Chemistry, materials science, thin films
- Workplaces: Argonne National Laboratory
- Website: www.anl.gov/profile/jeffrey-w-elam

Jeffrey Elam is a Distinguished Fellow, Senior Chemist and Group Leader in the Applied Materials Division at the U.S. Department of Energy's Argonne National Laboratory. He leads Argonne's atomic layer deposition (ALD) research program, where he directs research and development and commercialization of thin film coating technologies for energy applications.

Elam is a fellow of the Northwestern-Argonne Institute of Science and Engineering, and staff member at the Center for Molecular Engineering at Argonne. He also manages the Functional Coatings Group in Argonne's Applied Materials Division and is a principal investigator in the US-Israel Collaborative Water-Energy Research Center (CoWERC), and the Advanced Materials for Energy-Water Systems Center, a DOE Energy Frontier Research Center.

== Education ==
Elam graduated from Cornell University with a bachelor's degree in chemistry, followed by the University of Chicago with a PhD in physical chemistry in the lab of Donald H. Levy. Elam pursued postdoctoral studies with Steven M. George at the University of Colorado where he developed ALD thin film growth methods.

== Research ==
=== Oleo Sponge ===
Elam co-invented (with Seth Darling) the Oleo Sponge, a polyurethane foam engineered to absorb oil from water. Researchers engineered the material to be oleophilic and hydrophobic using sequential infiltration synthesis (SIS), a patented-material synthesis method Elam co-invented that has been cited by multiple companies. SIS was used to coat the interior surfaces of the foam with a thin layer of metal oxide “primer” that acts as a glue for attaching a monolayer of oleophilic molecules. The result is a reusable sponge capable of adsorbing up to 90 times its weight in oil.

=== Large Area Microchannel Plates ===
Elam was part of the team that developed the world's largest microchannel plate (MCP), a solid-state, 2-dimensional electron amplifier critical to a variety of imaging and sensing applications. This was achieved by using ALD nanocomposite coatings to create a manufacturing strategy for MCPs that drove down cost, improved performance, and widened applications. The ALD coatings have been implemented by Incom, Inc. to manufacture large area MCPs and are being incorporated into large area photodetectors. The patent for fabricating the technology has been cited by more than a dozen companies, including Samsung, Nova Scientific and Nissan.

=== Scale-up of Transparent Conducting Oxide Coatings ===
Elam led a team to create ALD methods for depositing ITO films, a common transparent conducting thin film found in devices such as solar cells, flat panel displays, and touch screens, onto nanoporous supports and over large substrate areas. One patented method, which used two oxygen-sources “synergistically” to allow materials to grow at lower-than-normal temperatures, proved capable of coating nanoporous materials with high precision and uniformity.

== Publications ==
Elam has authored over 300 papers on the subject of ALD, and his work has been cited over 42,000 times. His most cited study, published in 2003, demonstrated the low temperature growth of Al_{2}O_{3} ALD films—which have the potential to coat thermally fragile substrates such as organic, polymeric, or biological materials—at temperatures as low as 33 °C. His research group has amassed numerous inventions in ALD coating technology and holds more than 75 patents.

== Honors ==
Elam is a fellow of the American Vacuum Society and the Electrochemical Society. In 2017, he received the ALD Innovation Award from the AVS for original work and leadership in ALD. In 2019 he received a lifetime achievement award from Argonne.

== Notable patents ==
- Metal fluoride passivation coatings prepared by atomic layer deposition for Li-ion batteries, (2019).
- Sequential infiltration synthesis for enhancing multiple-patterning lithography, (2015).
- Tunable Resistance Coatings, (2014).
- Growth Rate Control in ALD by Surface Functionalization, (2015).
- Microchannel plate detectors and methods for their fabrication, (2015).
