= Single-walled carbon nanohorn =

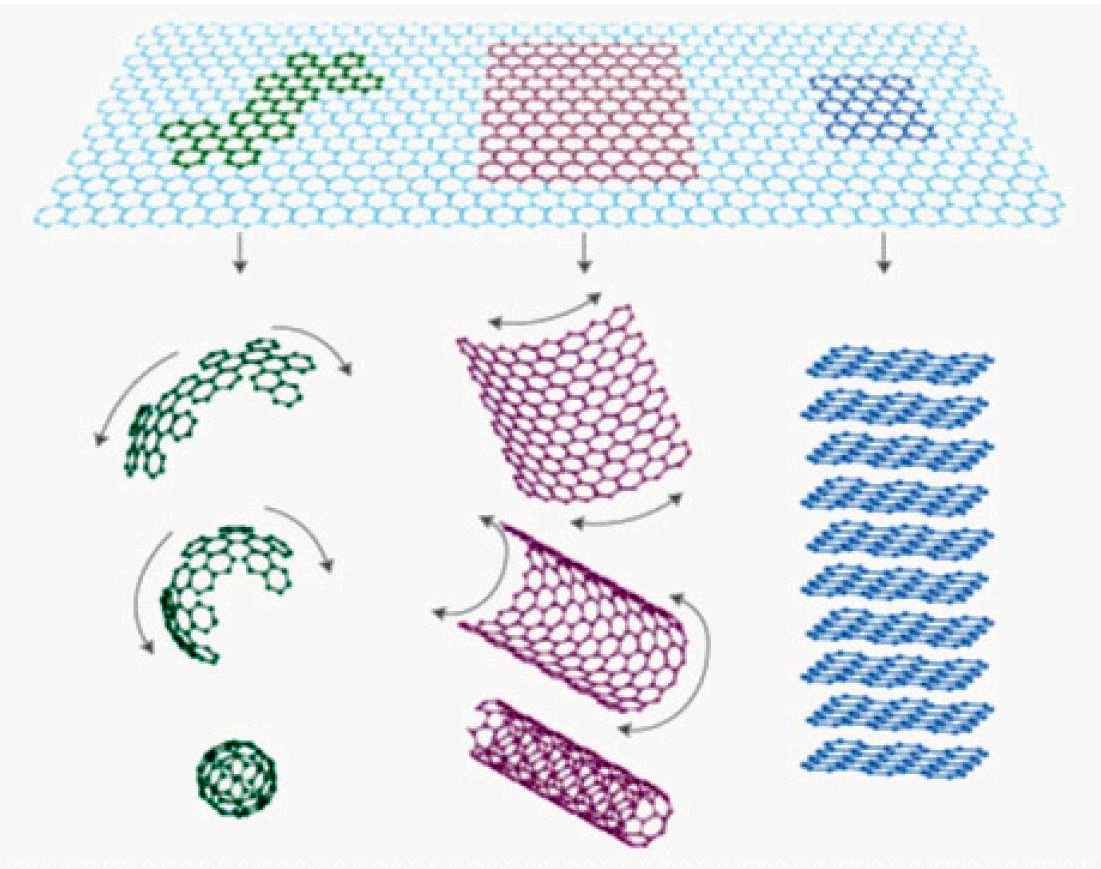
Schematic representation of different carbon nanomaterials—Fullerene, carbon nanotube and graphene.

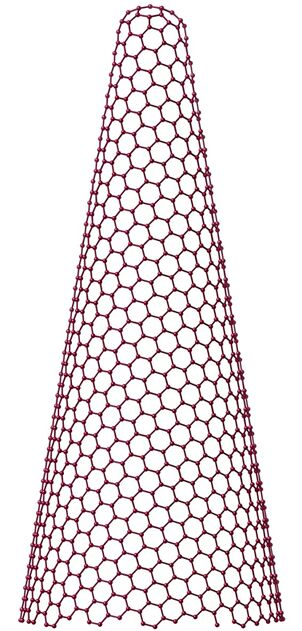
Schematic representation of a single carbon nanohorn.

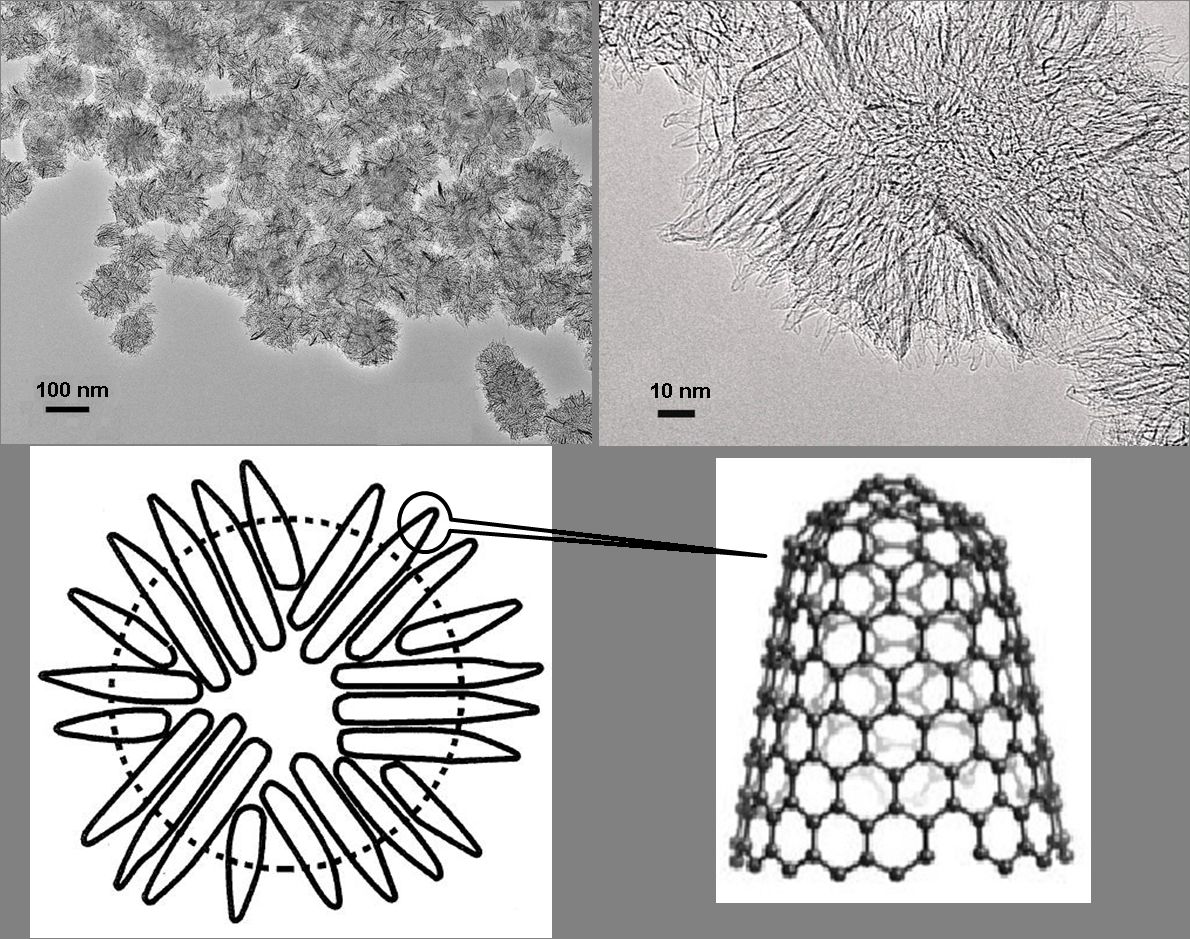
Carbon nanohorn aggregate

Single-walled carbon nanohorn (SWNH or SWCNH) is the name given by Sumio Iijima and colleagues in 1999 to a horn-shaped sheath aggregate of graphene sheets. Very similar structures had been observed in 1994 by Peter J.F. Harris, Edman Tsang, John Claridge and Malcolm Green. Ever since the discovery of the fullerene, the family of carbon nanostructures has been steadily expanded. Included in this family are single-walled and multi-walled carbon nanotubes (SWNTs and MWNTs), carbon onions and cones and, most recently, SWNHs. These SWNHs with about 40–50 nm in tubule length and about 2–3 nm in diameter are derived from SWNTs and end with a five-pentagon conical cap with a cone opening angle of ~20^{o}. Moreover, thousands of SWNHs associate with each other to form the 'dahlia-like' and 'bud-like' structured aggregates which have an average diameter of about 80–100 nm. The former consists of tubules and graphene sheets protruding from its surface like petals of a dahlia, while the latter is composed of tubules developing inside the particle itself. Their unique structures with high surface area and microporosity make SWNHs become a promising material for gas adsorption, biosensing, drug delivery, gas storage and catalyst support for fuel cells. Single-walled carbon nanohorns are an example of the family of carbon nanocones.

== Synthesis ==
SWNHs can be synthesized with high purity by CO_{2} laser ablation and arc discharge without a metal catalyst. The following two subsections respectively show the representative procedures for the two synthesis methods. The size and purity of the SWNHs can be changed by varying the parameters such as temperature, pressure, voltage and current.

=== CO_{2} laser ablation ===
The CO_{2} laser ablation technique is utilized to produce the first SWNHs at room temperature in the absence of a metal catalyst. The CO_{2} laser ablation generator is composed of a high-power CO_{2} laser source (with a wavelength of 10.6 μm, 5 kW of power, 10 nm of beam diameter, and the pulse width varies from 10 ms to continuous illumination) and a plastic-resin reaction chamber attached with a vacuum pumping system, inlet and outlet gas valves and a ZnSe lens system to adjust beam intensity. Ar gas is introduced and flowed through the inside chamber to remove the products to the collection filter under the pressure of 760 Torr at room temperature. Meanwhile, a graphite rod in the middle of the chamber continuously rotates and advances along its axis so that a new surface could be exposed to the laser beam that is vertical to the rod and thus SWNHs are produced.

=== Arc discharge ===
SWNHs can also be prepared by a simple pulsed arc discharge between pure carbon rods in the atmospheric pressure of air and He and Ar with arcing period of 30s. The arc current is set at 120 A and voltage between the electrodes is 15 V. Pre-heating of the carbon rod up to 1000 °C, is conducted just before ignition of arc to improve the quality of SWNHs. The arc soot deposited on the surface of the chamber is collected and characterized. By this method, the purity of obtained SWNHs is higher than 90%. The mean size of SWNH particles is about 50 nm, which is smaller than those prepared by the CO_{2} laser method.

== Properties ==
=== Porosity ===
Soon after the discovery of the SWNHs, the scientists made efforts to study the structure of this new material. In 2000, a detailed X-ray diffraction examination showed that the interhorn-wall distance was 0.4 nm, greater than the interlayer spacing of graphite (0.335 nm). Thus SWNH aggregates should have both microporosity and mesoporosity originating from the above specific structure. An exact surface characterization of SWNHs can extend the application possibilities to secondary energy storage.

The pore structure of SWNHs has been extensively studied using simulation and adsorption experiments. The SWNH aggregates have a considerable capacity of micropores and a little mesoporosity due to the hexagonal stacking structure of the SWNHs.

In 2001, N_{2} adsorption was observed in the internal nanospace and on the external surface of the single SWNH particle, studied by grand canonical Monte Carlo simulation and was compared with the experimental results. The detailed comparison of the simulated adsorption isotherm with the experimental isotherm in the internal nanospaces provided 2.9 nm of the average pore width of the internal nanospaces. The high-resolution N_{2} adsorption analysis could clearly elucidate the presence of internal nanopores, external micropores of the triangular arrangement of three particles, and interparticle mesopores in the assembly structure for partially oxidized SWNHs.

In 2002, it was found that nanoscale windows were produced on the wall when the SWNHs were oxidized in oxygen at high temperature. The size and concentration of these nanoscale windows could be controlled by the oxidation temperature. Besides, the oxidation and compression of SWNHs could induce a pronounced increase in the microporosity and the production of mesopores.

Although the intraparticle pore of the original SWNHs is completely closed, 11 and 36% of the intraparticle pore spaces become open by oxidation at 573 and 623 K, respectively. As the number and size of the windows in the wall of SWNH can be varied by the heating temperature, the possibility for a molecular selective adsorbent is shown. In addition, adsorption analysis can provide a reliable means for evaluation of the pore structure parameters of the interstitial and internal microporosity. The adsorption study showed that the budlike SWNH aggregates possess micropores despite the closed individual nanohorns. A distinctive feature of these micropores is the small average pore width of 1.0 nm. Heat treatment in oxygen opens the closed nanohorns and thus increases the micropore space available for adsorption. The oxidation affects mostly the closed pores by creating windows on the walls and does not change the bundle structure as well as the interstitial microporosity. Opening mechanism of internal nanoporosity of single-wall carbon nanohorn was revealed through careful oxidation, which allowed controlling the internal nanoporosity. The opening rate was also controllable by oxidation temperature.

At the same year (2002) as the discovery of nanoscale windows, adsorption isotherms of hydrogen in internal and interstitialspaces of SWNH assemblies were also determined experimentally, which provided the adsorbed density of hydrogen in internal and interstitial spaces. The fact that the adsorbed density of hydrogen in interstitial spaces is lower than that in internal spaces against the prediction from the interaction potential calculation was explained by the self-stabilization effect of the self-locking mechanism.

In 2005, Kaneko et al. declared that the porosity of SWNH assemblies changed after treatment with HNO_{3}. In this case, SWNH assemblies probably possess unavailable interstitial pores at the core of the bundle for adsorption. The intercalation of HNO_{3} into such narrow interstitial spaces resulted in an increase of the pore volume, which developed the microporosity, thus highly ultramicroporous SWNH assemblies were successfully prepared. Moreover, the ultramicroporous SWNH assemblies showed much higher storage capacity of supercritical CH_{4}, showing potential application as a gas storage media.

The detailed structure of SWNHs was further extensively analyzed with X-ray photoelectron spectroscopy (XPS) and Raman spectroscopy. The considerably strong peak due to single bonding carbons was observed in C1s XPS spectrum of SWNH. This peak intensity increased with oxidation treatment, coinciding with the decrease in Raman G/D intensity ratio. It was concluded that the presence of a considerable amount of single bonding carbons was the reason for the unique assembly structure accompanying with a strong D-band in Raman spectrum of SWNHs. The inside structure of SWNHs was examined by electron microscopy observations after focused ion beam (FIB) cutting. It was revealed that the interior consists of disordered single-layered graphene sheets with a lateral size of up to 10 nm and an interlayer distance of approximately 4–5 Å.

=== Electronic properties ===
The electronic properties are greatly influenced by the unique conical structure of SWNHs. Most of the studies on the electronic properties investigated the conical endcaps that contain five pentagons in the hexagonal network. Berber et al. utilized theoretical calculations to determine the stability, optimum geometry, and electronic properties of SWNHs and found a net electron transfer to the pentagonal sites of the SWNH tips by simulated scanning tunneling microscopy(STM). The local density of electronic states at the tip varies corresponding to the shapes of the SWNHs that differ in the relative locations of the five pentagons. Pursuing this further, Kolesnikov et al. proposed a hyperboloid geometry that has a cone asymptotic at large distance and a smoothing at the tip for SWNHs. They investigated the influence of the pentagonal defects on the electronic properties of the SWNHs within the continuum gauge field-theory model. They found that only for five pentagons at the tip does a normalized electron state appear at the Fermi level (a hypothetical level of potential energy for an electron inside a crystalline solid) for an unbounded hyperboloid. The electronic properties of dahlia-SWNHs and oxidized SWNHs were also studied by adsorption of gas such as CO_{2}(an electron donor) and O_{2} (an electron acceptor). The increased electronic conductivity with adsorption of CO_{2} indicates that dahlia-SWNHs are n-type semiconductors. On the other hand, the electronic conductivity increases after an initial drop for the oxidized SWNHs, implying that SWNHs can be transformed into p-type semiconductors after oxidation treatment. The initial drop is due to transfer of electrons from CO_{2} to ox-SWNH annihilates holes, reducing the conductivity, while the later increase is because of the further electron transfer from CO_{2} after compensation of the hole carriers. As expected, the addition of CO_{2} results in a decreasing electronic conductivity of the SWNHs.

=== Magnetic properties ===
The magnetic properties are closely interrelated to the electronic properties in SWNHs. In one electronic spin resonance (ESR) work, two electronic systems were discovered for dahlia-like SWNHs. The first one has a unique temperature-activated paramagnetic susceptibility due to the two-dimensional (2D) graphene-like structure at the surface of the dahlia particles. The second type is due to the disordered graphiticlike interior of the dahlia particles that consist of crushed nanohorns and touching graphene sheets. In this type, the susceptibility is increasing with decreasing temperature until 17 K. This susceptibility is composed of Curie (localized spins) and significant Pauli (conduction electrons, temperature independent) components. Here, the number of localized spins (1.2×10^{−4} per C atom) is larger than that of multiwall carbon nanotubes (MWNTs) by one magnitude, while the Pauli susceptibility is comparable to that of MWNTs. On the other hand, a large suppression of the paramagnetic susceptibility is observed below 17 K. This phenomenon implies an antiferromagnetic correlation between the localized electrons, in which the localized spins pair into antiferromagnetic singlet pairs. However, the concentration of the localized electrons is too low. To explain this, Garaj et al. suggested that the singlet coupling was mediated by conducting electrons.

Additionally, a typical SWNH consisting of ~10000 carbon atoms with about 40 nm of length and 2 nm of diameter has at least one unpaired electron spin that may derivate from the electronic structure of the nanohorn tips. The spin susceptibility for SWNHs is one order of magnitude smaller than that of randomly oriented graphite, but is close to that of C_{60} and C_{70}. Normally, a large diamagnetism is expected for the sp2 bonded carbon materials due to the existence of π-electron orbital magnetism. It is suggested that the unusual small diamagnetic susceptibility observed for SWNHs is due to the cancellation of expected large diamagnetism by Van Vleck paramagnetism.

== Functionalization ==
Various methods have been developed to functionalize carbon nanohorns including covalent bonding, π-π stacking, supramolecular assembly and decoration of metal nanoparticles.

Tetracationic water-soluble porphyrin (H_{2}P_{4}^{+}) could be immobilized by π-π stacking interactions onto the skeleton of SWNHs. The efficient fluorescence quenching of the H_{2}P_{4}^{+} moiety in the SWNH-H_{2}P_{4}^{+} nanoensemble was probed by steady-state as well as time-resolved fluorescence spectroscopy, suggesting charge separation from the photoexcited H_{2}P_{4}^{+} to SWNH.

Similarly, organic π-electron donor, tetrathiafulvalene (TTF-) could be assembled onto SWNHs through coulombic attraction to form a water-soluble nanohybrid with positively charged pyrene (pyr^{+}) as a medium. Electronic interactions within the nanoensemble were probed by optical spectroscopy, indicating electron transfer between the TTF units and CNHs after light illumination.

SWNHs can also be oxidized to generate functional groups for further bio-modification. Light-assisted oxidation with hydrogen peroxide effectively and rapidly creates abundant oxygenated groups such as carboxylic groups at the hole edges. These oxygenated groups could react with the protein bovine serum albumin to form bio-conjugates which were highly dispersed in phosphate-buffered saline and could be taken up by cultured mammalian cells via an endocytosis pathway.

In another report, functionalization of carbon nanohorns was achieved using two different synthetic protocols: (1) direct attack of a free amino group on the nanohorn sidewalls (nucleophilic addition) and (2) amidation reaction of the carboxylic functions in oxidized nanohorns. The electronic properties of the porphyrin/nanohorn assemblies (SWNH/H_{2}P) have been investigated by a combination of several techniques to show the electron-transfer process between the porphyrins and the carbon nanostructures. Amino carbon nanohorn aggregates serve as a nanoscale container for repetitive crystallization of ionic crystals under atomic-resolution electron microscopic observation.

Furthermore, zinc phthalocyanine could be non-covalently attached to oxidized SWNHs through by π-π interactions to form ZnPc-SWNHox, which was then functionalized with BSA covalently to form by ZnPc-SWNHox-BSA nanoensembles. Upon photoexcitation, charge separation takes place from the excited singlet state of ZnPc to SWNHox. This findings may broaden the range of utilization of SWNHox in photochemistry, as well as photobiology. Zinc porphyrin could also bind to oxidized SWNHs through covalent bonding with a spacer and a crown ether. This nanohybrid showed similar photoinduced electron-transfer processes.

In addition, SWNHs can be functionalized using noble metal nanoparticles. Pd-tailored SWNHs were prepared by reducing H_{2}PdCl_{4} to SWNHs to catalyze a water formation reaction. SWNHs could also be decorated by gold nanoparticles via a block polyelectrolyte to form water-soluble nanohybrid colloids. This new material is bio-compatible and has potential applications in bio-medical researches.

Recently, liposomes were assembled onto SWNHs through electrostatic attraction to form a soluble and bio-compatible nanohybrid. Assembling lipids around carbon nanohorns would confer this nanomaterial much broader applications such as vaccine development and targeted drug delivery by embedding a target protein or immunogenic protein into the lipid bilayer structure.

== Applications ==
Carbon nanohorn is a promising material for chemical and bio-sensors because it facilitates electron transfer. Functionalized carbon nanohorns show better dispersity and when bio-conjugated, they can serve biomedical applications such as probing, imaging and drug delivering. Also, carbon nanohorns possess strong catalytic property, which can be applied to fuel cell fabrication. Due to their tremendous porosity, they are great materials for gas storage. Besides, as they have high current capacity and stability, they have applications in field emission.

=== Sensor materials ===
A gas sensor composed of SWNHs could be fabricated with an electrokinetic method using dielectrophoresis (DEP). Conductance of the DEP-fabricated SWNH sensor increased or decreased upon exposure to ppm-levels of NO_{2} or NH_{3}, respectively, similar to the previously obtained CNT gas sensors which suggests that the SWNH aggregate behaves as a p-type semiconductor. The comparison reveals that intrinsic NO_{2} sensitivity of the SWNHs is lower than that of single-wall CNTs but comparable with the intrinsic sensitivity of multiple-wall CNTs (MWCNTs). Another gas sensor using coating film of SWHNs aimed to detect ozone in water. This sensor is based on the phenomena that the electric resistance of the SWNHs-film decreased with the adsorption of ozone molecules due to charge transfer from the surface of SWNHs to O_{3} molecules. The shift of the electric resistance of the SWNH-film was correlated with the ozone concentration and temperature based on monolayer adsorption model with consideration of activation energies of the relevant adsorption, desorption, and sensitivity of charge transfer.

SWNHs could also be used to prepare a hydrogen peroxide amperometric sensor using a carbon paste electrode. SWNHs paste electrode is an interesting alternative to high surface area platinum electrode for determination of hydrogen peroxide, demonstrating a metal-free and user-friendly electrochemical sensing method. Another hydrogen peroxide biosensor was fabricated using soybean peroxidase decorated SWNHs modified electrode based on the realization of direct electrochemistry of enzyme. In the absence of a mediator, this H_{2}O_{2} biosensor exhibited a high sensitivity and a wide linear range. Applying similar principles, the SWNHs-modified glass carbon electrode displayed excellent electrochemical catalytic activities and could be used to simultaneously determine uric acid, dopamine, and ascorbic acid in urine samples.

Special designed SWNHs nanocomposites have versatile biosensing applications. One example is the sandwich nanohybrid of SWNHs–TiO_{2}–porphyrin, prepared via the dentate binding of TiO_{2} nanoparticles to carboxylate groups. The nanohybrid showed an excellent electrocatalytic activity towards the reduction of chloramphenicol in neutral media, leading to a highly sensitive and stable amperometric biosensor for chloramphenicol. Another example is the specific peptide functionalized SWNHs nanocomposite, which was used to fabricate an immunosensor towards microcystin-LR. Compared to other nanomaterials, SWNHs increased the sensitivity of immunoassay.

=== Nanocomposites ===
Reinforcing a nanocomposite with carbon nanotubes (CNTs) improves its mechanical properties including modulus, tensile strength, and failure strength. It has also been reported that adding CNT to polyacrylonitrile (PAN)/CNT fiber composites decreases the fibrillation tendency of these fibers. Considering the superior properties of CNHs over CNTs, such as larger surface area, it is expected that CNH-reinforced nanocomposites show even higher performance compared to CNT-reinforced nanocomposites. However, higher surface of CNHs compared to the CNTs results in the higher tendency of these structures for agglomeration which impedes the wide application of CNHs as a reinforcement for nanocomposites. Agglomerates act as stress concentration sites which reduce the overall strength of nanocomposites. Furthermore, there are some reports on the adverse effect of presence of agglomerates on the physicochemical properties of nanocomposites.

Mechanical properties of CNH-reinforced nanocomposites are studied both experimentally and using theoretical calculations. During the experimental studies, ranges of experimental processing variables (PAN- based solution concentration, amount of nanohorns in suspension, ultrasounds frequency and power, sonication time) have been studied. It is shown that increasing sonication time is in favor of reducing the agglomerate size, while increasing the polymer has an adverse effect. Furthermore, adding surfactant enhances the dispersion of the agglomerates. The processing method used for making the nanocomposite affects distribution of CNH agglomerates which consequently affects the mechanical properties of the manufactured nanocomposite. For example, the tensile strength of a poorly made nanocomposite falls 30% to 35% compared to the pure polymer matrix. Effect of concentration of CNHs has also studied which shows that while increase in the concentration of CNHs does not affect the elastic modulus of the material, it changes the failure strain of the nanocomposite.

Theoretical studies show that the variation of stress along the CNHs is a function of their geometrical properties such as cone angle. For example, location of maximum axial normal stress becomes closer to the tip of CNH as the cone angle increases (Figure on the right). Furthermore, it has been shown that the variation of shear stress in the CNH/matrix surface is non-symmetric which is in contrast to symmetric distribution of shear stress in the CNT/matrix interface.

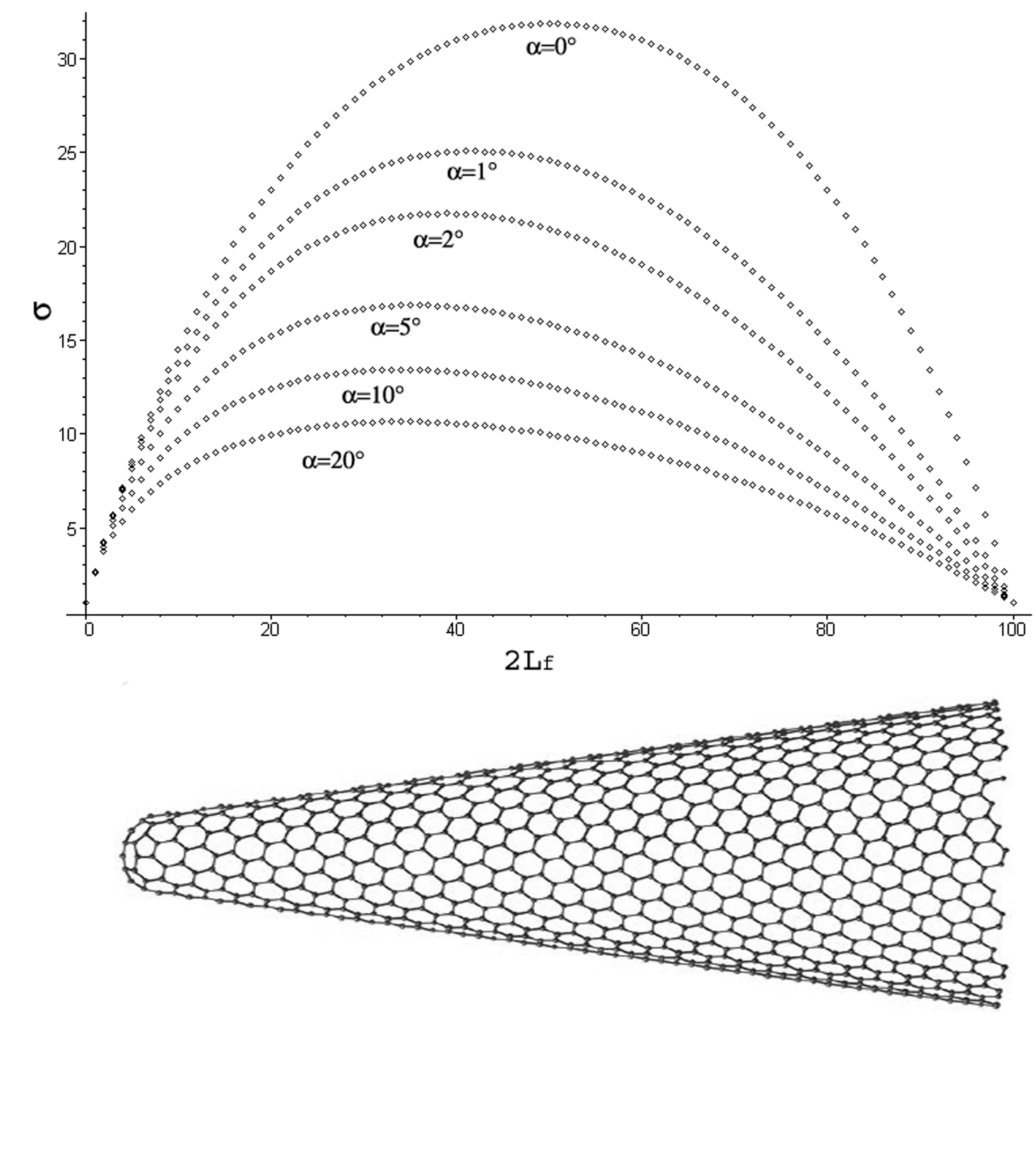
Schematic representation axial normal stress in a carbon nanohorn embedded in a nanocomposite under axial loading.

=== Biomedical engineering ===
Attributed to its distinctive dahlia-flowerlike structure and already desirable size (usually <100 nm), SWNHs are a potential vehicle for intracellular delivery. They could be successfully isolated by a copolymer (Gum Arabic) through steric stabilization. and in vitro study showed that the modified SWNHs are nontoxic and might be used as a promising vehicle for intracellular delivery.

The toxicity of SWNHs is a critical issue relating to their biomedical application, which has been investigated in vitro and in vivo extensively. The SWNHs were found to be a nonirritant and a nondermal sensitizer through skin primary and conjunctival irritation tests and skin sensitization test. Negative mutagenic and clastogenic potentials suggest that SWNHs are not carcinogenic. The acute peroral toxicity of SWNHs was found to be quite low—the lethal dosage for rats was more than 2000 mg/kg of body weight. Intratracheal instillation tests revealed that SWNHs rarely damaged rat lung tissue for a 90-day test period, although black pigmentation due to accumulated nanohorns was observed. While further toxicological assessments, including chronic (repeated dose), reproductive, and developmental toxicity studies, are still needed, yet the present results strongly suggest that as-grown SWNHs have low acute toxicities.

SWNHs find applications in anti-tumor drug delivery and therapy. Oxidized SWNHs could entrap cisplatin, an anticancer agent, which was slowly released from the SWNHs in aqueous environments. The released cisplatin was effective in terminating the growth of human lung-cancer cells, while the SWNHs themselves had no such effect, showing that cisplatin-incorporated oxidized SWNHs are a potential drug delivery system. Later, a new nanoprecipitation method to incorporate cisplatin inside SWHNox was reported involving dispersion of cisplatin and SWNHox in a solvent followed by the solvent evaporation. The incorporated cisplatin quantity increased from the previously reported value of 15 to 46%, and the total released quantity of cisplatin also increased from 60 to 100% by changing the solvent from dimethylformamide to water. Concurrently, in vitro anticancer efficiency of cisplatin@SWNHox increased to 4–6 times greater than that of the intact cisplatin. In vivo, cisplatin@SWNHox intratumorally injected to transplanted tumors of mice suppressed the tumor growth more than the intact cisplatin. Cisplatin@SWNHox adhered to the cell surfaces in vitro and stayed within the tumor tissues in vivo. Therefore, the cisplatin released from SWNHox realized high concentrations locally at the cells in vitro and in the tissues in vivo and could efficiently attack the tumor cells.

Similarly, vancomycin hydrochloride (VCM) could be incorporated into SWNHox for controlled release by taking advantage of the interactions between VCM and SWNHox. Phospholipid–poly (ethylene glycol) was used to modify the hydrophobic surface of SWNHox to improve its dispersion in aqueous systems. In the release study using this complex, a stable release of VCM was achieved for an extended period.

Polyethylene glycol could bind to the hydrophobic surface of SWNHs to enhance their dispersibility in water for further application in drug delivery. Adsorption of polyethylene glycol-doxorubicin (PEG-DXR) conjugate onto SWNHox could form a water-soluble nanocomposite. SWNHs served as drug carriers to realize local cancel chemotherapy. When injected intratumorally, PEG-DXR SWNHs caused significant retardation of tumor growth associated with prolonged DXR retention in the tumor, showing that water-dispersed SWNHs were useful drug carriers for local chemotherapy.

In drug delivery, it is essential to quantitatively determine biodistribution and ultrastructural localization. To achieve this, Gd_{2}O_{3} nanoparticles were embedded within SWNH aggregates (Gd_{2}O_{3}@SWNHag) to facilitate detection and quantification. Gd_{2}O_{3}@SWNHag was intravenously injected into mice, and the quantities of Gd in the internal organs were measured by inductively coupled plasma atomic emission spectroscopy: 70–80% of the total injected material accumulated in liver. The high electron scattering ability of Gd allows detection with energy dispersive X-ray spectroscopy and facilitates the ultrastructural localization of individual Gd_{2}O_{3}@SWNHag with transmission electron microscopy. In the liver, the Gd_{2}O_{3}@SWNHag was localized in Kupffer cells but were not observed in hepatocytes. In the Kupffer cells, most of the Gd_{2}O_{3}@SWNHag was detected inside phagosomes, but some were in another cytoplasmic compartment that was most likely the phagolysosome.

=== Fuel cell ===
As mentioned above, SWNHs can be decorated with Pt nanoparticles to have great catalytic activity. Pt nanoparticles with diameters less than 5 nm could be well dispersed on SWNHs and this catalytic nanohybrid was useful for the power generation by polymer electrolyte fuel cell.

Another fuel cell was built by electropolymerization of methylene blue (MB) onto SWNHs modified electrode. Glucose dehydrogenase was then immobilized on the poly MB–SWNHs modified electrode for the oxidation of glucose. Employing Pt nanoparticles supported on functionalized TiO_{2} colloidal spheres with nanoporous surface as cathode catalyst, the as-assembled glucose/O_{2} biofuel cell operate at the physiological condition with good performance.

=== Gas storage ===
==== Hydrogen storage ====
Hydrogen storage is a key enabling technology for the advancement of fuel cell power systems in transportation applications. Solid adsorbents which can store fuel gases such as hydrogen and methane at high density have been requested for environments protection, because hydrogen and methane vehicles have low emissions of CO_{2}. However, it is difficult to store these gases in a highly dense state, because supercritical gases do not condense to liquid at room temperature even under high pressure. Carbon materials such as Graphite nanofibers (GNF), single-wall carbon nanotubes (SWNT), and modified carbon nanotubes are hopeful hydrogen storage candidates. The gas storage mechanism includes four different concepts, that is physical adsorption, chemisorption, absorption, and occlusion. Physical adsorption is the most suitable mechanism to the application of fuel cells because it is reversible and both adsorption and desorption rates are very large, although the ordinary storage capacity by physical adsorption is limited because of weak hydrogen-hydrogen and hydrogen-carbon interactions. Although chemisorption is realized to have the high adsorption capacity, it is not reversible. On the other hand, absorption and occlusion are usually difficult in carbon materials because the carbon structure is rigid. SWNH is a new material that is similar to SWNT. Due to its high purity (>95%) without any metal catalyst, SWNH has been thought to be an ideal candidate for hydrogen storage study, without any possible effect by metallic particles as catalyst on hydrogen storage capacity. Murata et al.'s study determined the exact physical adsorption amounts of supercritical hydrogen on the single-wall carbon nanohorn (SWNH) assemblies were at 77, 196, and 303 K. There are two physical adsorption sites of SWNH, that are interstitial and internal sites. Although the interaction potential depths of interstitial and internal spaces different, hydrogen densities in both spaces were similar. Hydrogen molecules adsorbed in the interstitial spaces cannot form the stable cluster owing to the space limitation, however, hydrogen can be stabilized by the strong fluid-fluid interaction due to the cluster formation in the internal spaces.

==== Methane storage ====
Noriaki Sano et al. synthesized single-walled carbon nanohorns (SWNHs) via a gas-injected arc-in-water method. The electrode configuration and duration of arc discharge were modified in order to enhance the yield and methane-adsorption properties of SWNHs. Using these modified experimental parameters, the horn units in the SWNH aggregates increased in size, and the thermal stability of SWNHs in an oxidative environment increased accordingly. SWNHs obtained using the above modified conditions adsorbed a larger amount of methane than did SWNHs obtained from the conventional synthetic conditions. The effect of a mild oxidation treatment on SWNHs on their methane adsorption suggested that SWNHs with micropores would be more flexible than pristine SWNHs. By comparing the methane adsorption on the oxidized SWNHs to that on the pristine SWNHs, one can see that the oxidation of the SWNHs significantly increased the amount of methane adsorbed per apparent volume of SWNH bulk. The amount of methane adsorbed per apparent volume of oxidized SWNHs was about 2 times larger than that of pristine SWNHs, and the amount of methane adsorbed per mass of oxidized SWNHs was about 1.8 times larger than that of pristine SWNHs. The difference between "2 times" and 1.8 times" suggests that oxidized SWNHs can be packed more densely by compression than the pristine SWNHs, which is due to the change in the structural flexibility of SWNHs caused by mild oxidation.

=== Field emission ===
Field emission is emission of electrons induced by an electrostatic field. Among the tasks for optimization of the field emission, the development of large scale/low price production methods is one of the key problem. Carbon nanohorns can be synthesized in large quantities, and the product, unlike nanotubes, does not need any further purification. The carbon nanohorn thin films show good field emission characteristics due to the sharp horn-like structures, in particular a low turn-on field and good long-term stability. The only marked difference with respect to nanotube films is that when current densities higher than 1 mA/cm^{2}, permanent damage will apply to the sample, whereas nanotubes can withstand densities that are higher by at least two orders of magnitude. This again may be due to the very peculiar structure and high resistivity of nanohorns. Since their long-term stability is comparable to that of nanotubes, nanohorns could represent an enticing alternative for field emission applications that do not require high current densities.
