= Aquamelt =

Naturally hydrated polymeric material

An aquamelt is a naturally hydrated polymeric material that is able to solidify at environmental temperatures through a controlled stress input (be it mechanical or chemical).

They are unique in being able to “lock in” work applied to them through an alteration in hydrogen bonding, which enables them to be processed with approximately 1000 times less energy than standard polymers. This has been recently shown for an archetypal biopolymer, silk, however the mechanism for solidification is thought to be inherent to many other biological materials.

== Discovery and mechanism ==
Aquamelts were defined as a new class of polymeric material as a result of a comparison between the spinning feedstock of the Chinese silkworm (Bombyx mori) and molten high-density polyethylene (HDPE) using shear induced polarised light imaging (SIPLI).

The current understanding of shear induced fibrillation requires polymer chains to undergo the following series of steps i) long-chain molecules are stretched, ii) and form persistent point nuclei, which iii) align under flow into rows and then iv) grow to create a crystalline fibrils. For these fibrils to remain, the temperature of the sample must be lowered to below the polymers melt point. This process is analogous to the fibrilogenesis of natural silk-polymers in which proteins align (refold), nucleate (denature), and crystallize (aggregate). However, for silks, fibrils persist without the need for a drop in temperature.

From a macromolecular perspective the two processes are thought to be similar due to a native protein's unique interaction with its closely bound water. Much like an individual polymer chain in a melt, a native protein and its closely bound water molecules may be considered not as a solution but as a single processable entity, a nanocomposite termed an "aquamelt".

The differences between a typical polymer and an aquamelt are highlighted by an aquamelt's ability to solidify in response to stress at environmental temperatures. This occurs when the stress applied is sufficient to separate the closely bound water from the protein, splitting the nanocomposite. This results in conformational changes to the protein and an increased probability to form hydrogen bonding between protein chains and subsequent solidification. Multiscale structures, i.e., fibrils or foams are the result of a combination of directional stress fields and the self-assembly properties of the aquamelt.

== Potential uses ==
Aquamelts offer several advantages over current solutions to synthetic polymer production. Firstly they are naturally sourced, with no reliance on oil for production and are recyclable and biodegradable. Secondly they can be processed at room temperatures and pressures resulting in only water as a by-product from the solidification process. Thirdly work calculations performed on silk and high-density polyethylene feedstocks revealed a tenfold difference in the amount of shear energy required in order to initiate solidification. When processing temperature is taken into account the difference in energy requirements to undergo solidification is a thousandfold less for aquamelts than synthetic polymers.
