= Hybrid material =

Composite materials

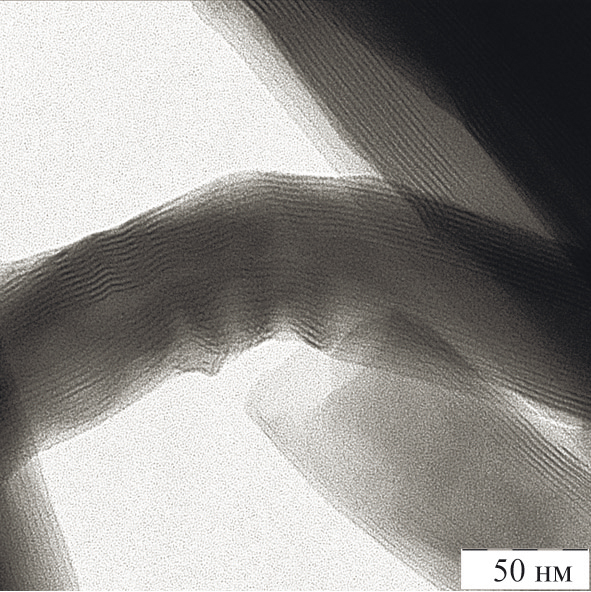
Nanotubes based on vanadium pentoxide, a hybrid material

Hybrid materials are composites consisting of two constituents at the nanometer or molecular level. Commonly one of these compounds is inorganic and the other one organic in nature. Thus, they differ from traditional composites where the constituents are at the macroscopic (micrometer to millimeter) level. Mixing at the microscopic scale leads to a more homogeneous material that either show characteristics in between the two original phases or even new properties.

== Introduction ==
=== Hybrid materials in nature ===
Many natural materials consist of inorganic and organic building blocks distributed on the nanoscale. In most cases the inorganic part provides mechanical strength and an overall structure to the natural objects while the organic part delivers bonding between the inorganic building blocks and/or the rest of the tissue. Typical examples include bone and nacre.

=== Development of hybrid materials ===
The first hybrid materials were the paints made from inorganic and organic components that were used thousands of years ago. Rubber is an example of the use of inorganic materials as fillers for organic polymers. The sol–gel process developed in the 1930s was one of the major driving forces what has become the broad field of inorganic–organic hybrid materials.

=== Classification ===
Hybrid materials can be classified based on the possible interactions connecting the inorganic and organic species. Class I hybrid materials are those that show weak interactions between the two phases, such as van der Waals, hydrogen bonding or weak electrostatic interactions. Class II hybrid materials are those that show strong chemical interactions between the components such as covalent bonds.

Structural properties can also be used to distinguish between various hybrid materials. An organic moiety containing a functional group that allows the attachment to an inorganic network, e.g. a trialkoxysilane group, can act as a network modifier because in the final structure the inorganic network is only modified by the organic group. Phenyltrialkoxysilanes are an example for such compounds; they modify the silica network in the sol–gel process via the reaction of the trialkoxysilane group without supplying additional functional groups intended to undergo further chemical reactions to the material formed. If a reactive functional group is incorporated the system is called a network functionalizer. The situation is different if two or three of such anchor groups modify an organic segment; this leads to materials in which the inorganic group is afterwards an integral part of the hybrid network. The latter type of system is known as network builder

Blends are formed if no strong chemical interactions exist between the inorganic and organic building blocks. One example for such a material is the combination of inorganic clusters or particles with organic polymers lacking a strong (e.g. covalent) interaction between the components. In this case a material is formed that consists for example of an organic polymer with entrapped discrete inorganic moieties in which, depending on the functionalities of the components, for example weak crosslinking occurs by the entrapped inorganic units through physical interactions or the inorganic components are entrapped in a crosslinked polymer matrix. If an inorganic and an organic network interpenetrate each other without strong chemical interactions, so called interpenetrating networks (IPNs) are formed, which is for example the case if a sol–gel material is formed in presence of an organic polymer or vice versa. Both materials described belong to class I hybrids. Class II hybrids are formed when the discrete inorganic building blocks, e.g. clusters, are covalently bonded to the organic polymers or inorganic and organic polymers are covalently connected with each other.

=== Distinction between nanocomposites and hybrid materials ===
The term nanocomposite is used if the combination of organic and inorganic structural units yield a material with composite properties. That is to say that the original properties of the separate organic and inorganic components are still present in the composite and are unchanged by mixing these materials. However, if a new property emerges from the intimate mixture, then the material becomes a hybrid. A macroscopic example is the mule, which is more suited for hard work than either of its parents, the horse and the donkey. The size of the individual components and the nature of their interaction (covalent, electrostatic, etc.) do not enter into the definition of a hybrid material.

== Advantages of hybrid materials over traditional composites ==
- Inorganic clusters or nanoparticles with specific optical, electronic or magnetic properties can be incorporated in organic polymer matrices.
- Contrary to pure solid state inorganic materials that often require a high temperature treatment for their processing, hybrid materials show a more polymer-like handling, either because of their large organic content or because of the formation of crosslinked inorganic networks from small molecular precursors just like in polymerization reactions.
- Light scattering in homogeneous hybrid material can be avoided and therefore optical transparency of the resulting hybrid materials and nanocomposites can be achieved.

== Synthesis ==
Two different approaches can be used for the formation of hybrid materials: Either well-defined preformed building blocks are applied that react with each other to form the final hybrid material in which the precursors still at least partially keep their original integrity or one or both structural units are formed from the precursors that are transformed into a new (network) structure. It is important that the interface between the inorganic and organic materials which has to be tailored to overcome serious problems in the preparation of hybrid materials. Different building blocks and approaches can be used for their preparation and these have to be adapted to bridge the differences of inorganic and organic materials.

=== Building block approach ===
Building blocks at least partially keep their molecular integrity throughout the material formation, which means that structural units that are present in these sources for materials formation can also be found in the final material. At the same time typical properties of these building blocks usually survive the matrix formation, which is not the case if material precursors are transferred into novel materials. Representative examples of such well-defined building blocks are modified inorganic clusters or nanoparticles with attached reactive organic groups.

Cluster compounds often consist of at least one functional group that allows an interaction with an organic matrix, for example by copolymerization. Depending on the number of groups that can interact, these building blocks are able to modify an organic matrix (one functional group) or form partially or fully crosslinked materials (more than one group). For instance, two reactive groups can lead to the formation of chain structures. If the building blocks contain at least three reactive groups they can be used without additional molecules for the formation of a crosslinked material.

Beside the molecular building blocks mentioned, nanosized building blocks, such as particles or nanorods, can also be used to form nanocomposites. The building block approach has one large advantage compared with the in situ formation of the inorganic or organic entities: because at least one structural unit (the building block) is well-defined and usually does not undergo significant structural changes during the matrix formation, better structure–property predictions are possible. Furthermore, the building blocks can be designed in such a way to give the best performance in the materials' formation, for example good solubility of inorganic compounds in organic monomers by surface groups showing a similar polarity as the monomers.

In recent years many building blocks have been synthesized and used for the preparation of hybrid materials. Chemists can design these compounds on a molecular scale with highly sophisticated methods and the resulting systems are used for the formation of functional hybrid materials. Many future applications, in particular in nanotechnology, focus on a bottom-up approach in which complex structures are hierarchically formed by these small building blocks. This idea is also one of the driving forces of the building block approach in hybrid materials.

=== In situ formation of the components ===
The in situ formation of the hybrid materials is based on the chemical transformation of the precursors used throughout materials' preparation. Typically this is the case if organic polymers are formed but also if the sol–gel process is applied to produce the inorganic component. In these cases well-defined discrete molecules are transformed to multidimensional structures, which often show totally different properties from the original precursors. Generally simple, commercially available molecules are applied and the internal structure of the final material is determined by the composition of these precursors but also by the reaction conditions. Therefore, control over the latter is a crucial step in this process. Changing one parameter can often lead to two very different materials. If, for example, the inorganic species is a silica derivative formed by the sol–gel process, the change from base to acid catalysis makes a large difference because base catalysis leads to a more particle-like microstructure while acid catalysis leads to a polymer-like microstructure. Hence, the final performance of the derived materials is strongly dependent on their processing and its optimization.

==== In situ formation of inorganic materials ====
Many of the classical inorganic solid state materials are formed using solid precursors and high temperature processes, which are often not compatible with the presence of organic groups because they are decomposed at elevated temperatures. Hence, these high temperature processes are not suitable for the in situ formation of hybrid materials. Reactions that are employed should have more the character of classical covalent bond formation in solutions. One of the most prominent processes which fulfill these demands is the sol–gel process. However, such rather low temperature processes often do not lead to the thermodynamically most stable structure but to kinetic products, which has some implications for the structures obtained. For example, low temperature derived inorganic materials are often amorphous or crystallinity is only observed on a very small length scale, i.e. the nanometer range. An example of the latter is the formation of metal nanoparticles in organic or inorganic matrices by reduction of metal salts or organometallic precursors.

Some methods of in situ formation of inorganic materials are:

- Sol-gel process
- Nonhydrolytic sol–gel process
- Sol–gel reactions of non-silicates
- Sequential infiltration synthesis (SIS)
- In-situ Microwave pyrolysis method

==== Formation of organic polymers in presence of preformed inorganic materials ====
If the organic polymerization occurs in the presence of an inorganic material to form the hybrid material one has to distinguish between several possibilities to overcome the incompatibility of the two species. The inorganic material can either have no surface functionalization but the bare material surface; it can be modified with nonreactive organic groups (e.g. alkyl chains); or it can contain reactive surface groups such as polymerizable functionalities. Depending on these prerequisites the material can be pretreated, for example a pure inorganic surface can be treated with surfactants or silane coupling agents to make it compatible with the organic monomers, or functional monomers can be added that react with the surface of the inorganic material. If the inorganic component has nonreactive organic groups attached to its surface and it can be dissolved in a monomer which is subsequently polymerized, the resulting material after the organic polymerization, is a blend. In this case the inorganic component interact only weakly or not at all with the organic polymer; hence, a class I material is formed. Homogeneous materials are only obtained in this case if agglomeration of the inorganic components in the organic environment is prevented. This can be achieved if the interactions between the inorganic components and the monomers are better or at least the same as between the inorganic components. However, if no strong chemical interactions are formed, the long-term stability of a once homogeneous material is questionable because of diffusion effects in the resulting hybrid material. The stronger the respective interaction between the components, the more stable is the final material. The strongest interaction is achieved if class II materials are formed, for example with covalent interactions.

==== Hybrid materials by simultaneous formation of both components ====
Simultaneous formation of the inorganic and organic polymers can result in the most homogeneous type of interpenetrating networks. Usually the precursors for the sol–gel process are mixed with monomers for the organic polymerization and both processes are carried out at the same time with or without solvent. Applying this method, three processes are competing with each other:

(a) the kinetics of the hydrolysis and condensation forming the inorganic phase,
(b) the kinetics of the polymerization of the organic phase, and
(c) the thermodynamics of the phase separation between the two phases.

By tailoring the kinetics of the two polymerizations in such a way that they occur simultaneously and rapidly enough, phase separation is avoided or minimized. Additional parameters such as attractive interactions between the two moieties, as described above can also be used to avoid phase separation.

One problem that also arises from the simultaneous formation of both networks is the sensitivity of many organic polymerization processes for sol–gel conditions or the composition of the materials formed. Ionic polymerizations, for example, often interact with the precursors or intermediates formed in the sol–gel process. Therefore, they are not usually applied in these reactions.

== Applications ==
- Decorative coatings obtained by the embedding of organic dyes in hybrid coatings.
- Scratch-resistant coatings with hydrophobic or anti-fogging properties.
- Nanocomposite based devices for electronic and optoelectronic applications including light-emitting diodes, photodiodes, solar cells, gas sensors and field effect transistors.
- Fire retardant materials for construction industry.
- Nanocomposite based dental filling materials.
- Composite electrolyte materials for applications such as solid-state lithium batteries or supercapacitors.
- Proton conducting membranes used in fuel cells.
- Antistatic / anti-reflection coatings
- Corrosion protection
- Porous hybrid materials
