= Sequential infiltration synthesis =

Film infiltration

Sequential infiltration synthesis (SIS) is a technique derived from atomic layer deposition (ALD) in which a polymer is infused with inorganic material using sequential, self-limiting exposures to gaseous precursors, enabling precise manipulation over the composition, structure, and properties. The technique has applications in fields such as nanotechnology, materials science, and electronics, where precise material engineering is required.

This synthesis uses metal-organic vapor-phase precursors and co-reactants that dissolve and diffuse into polymers. These precursors interact with the functional groups of the polymers through reversible complex formation or irreversible chemical reactions, resulting in composite materials that can exhibit nano-structured properties. The metal-organic precursor (A) and co-reactant vapor (B) are supplied in an alternating ABAB sequence. Following SIS, the organic phase may be removed thermally or chemically to leave only the inorganic components behind. This approach facilitates the fabrication of materials with controlled properties such as composition, stylometric, porosity, conductivity, refractive index, and chemical functionality on the nano-scale.

SIS has been utilized in fields, including electronics, energy storage, and catalysis, for its ability to modify material properties. SIS is sometimes referred to as "multiple pulsed vapor-phase infiltration" (MPI), "vapor phase infiltration" (VPI) or "sequential vapor infiltration" (SVI).

SIS involves the 3D distribution of functional groups in polymers, while its predecessor, ALD, is associated with the two-dimensional distribution of reactive sites on solid surfaces. In SIS, the partial pressures and exposure times for the precursor pulse are typically larger compared to ALD to ensure adequate infiltration of the precursor into the three-dimensional polymer volume through dissolution and diffusion. The process relies on the diffusive transport of precursors within polymers, with the resulting distribution influenced by time, pressure, temperature, polymer chemistry, and micro-structure.

== History ==
The diffusion of precursors below the surfaces of polymers during ALD was observed in 2005 by the Steven M. George group when they observed that polymers could uptake trimethylaluminium (TMA) via absorption within their free volume. In the study, the interactions between the ALD precursors and the polymer functional groups were not recognized, and the diffusion of precursors into polymer films was considered a problem. Hence, the diffusion and reactions of ALD precursors into polymer films were considered challenges to address rather than opportunities. However, potential benefits of these phenomena were demonstrated by Knez and coworkers in a 2009 report describing the increased toughness of spider silk following vapor-phase infiltration.

Sequential infiltration synthesis (SIS) was developed by Argonne National Laboratory scientists Jeffrey Elam and Seth Darling in 2010 to synthesize nanoscopic materials starting from block copolymer templates. A patent application was filed in 2011 and the first patent was issued in 2016. SIS involves vapour diffusing into an existing polymer and chemically or physically binding to it. This results in the growth and formation of inorganic structures by selective nucleation throughout the bulk polymer.

With SIS, the shapes of various inorganic materials can be tailored by applying their precursor chemistries to patterned or nano-structured organic polymers, such as block copolymers. SIS was developed to intentionally enable the infusion of inorganic materials such as metal oxides and metals within polymers to yield hybrid materials with enhanced properties. Hybrid materials created via SIS can further be subjected to thermal annealing steps to remove the polymer constituents entirely to derive purely inorganic materials that maintain the structure of the original polymer morphology, including mesoporosity.

Although the early research in SIS focused on a small number of inorganic materials such as Al_{2}O_{3}, TiO_{2}, and ZnO, the technology diversified over the next decade and came to include a wide variety of both inorganic materials and organic polymers, as detailed in reviews.

== Principles and process ==
SIS is based on the consecutive introduction of different precursors into a polymer, taking advantage of the material's porosity on the molecular scale. This allows the precursors to diffuse into the material and react with specific functional groups located along the polymer backbone or pendant group. Through the selection and combination of the precursors, a rich variety of materials can be synthesized, each of which can endow unique properties to the material.

The process of SIS involves various key steps, the first of which is materials selection. A suitable substrate material, such as a polymer film, and precursors, typically molecules that can react with the substrate's functional groups, are used for the infiltration synthesis. The pairing of polymer chemistry and precursor species is vital for acquiring the desired fictionalization and modification.

The substrate is placed in a reactor with an inert atmosphere (typically an inert gas or vacuum). The first precursor vapor (e.g., trimethylaluminum, TMA) is introduced at a sufficiently high vapor pressure and duration such that the precursor molecules diffuse into the substrate. Thus the precursor infiltrates the material and then reacts with the interior functional groups.

After a suitable diffusion/reaction time, the reactor is purged with inert gas or evacuated to remove reaction byproducts and UN-reacted precursors. A second vapor-phase species, often a co-reactant, such as H_{2}O, is introduced. Again, the precursor partial pressure and exposure time are selected to allow sufficient time and thermodynamic driving force for diffusion into the polymer and reaction with the functional groups left by the first precursor exposure. The second precursor is then purged or evacuated to complete the first SIS cycle.

The second precursor may also create new functional groups for reaction with the first precursor for subsequent SIS cycles. Sequential infiltration steps can then be repeated using the same or different precursor species until the desired modifications are achieved. When the desired infiltrations are achieved, the modified material can undergo further post-treatment steps to enhance the modified layers' properties, including stability. Post-treatment may include heating, chemical treatment, or oxidation to remove the organic polymer.

With SIS it is natural to apply to block co-polymer substrates. Block co-polymers such as polystyrene-block-poly(methyl methotrexate), PS-b-PMMA, can spontaneously undergo micro-phase separation to form a rich variety of periodic mesoscale patterns. If the SIS precursors are selected to react with just one of the BCP components but not with the second component, then the inorganic material will only nucleate and grow in that component. For instance, TMA will react with the PMMA side chains of PS-b-PMMA but not with the PS side chains. Consequently, SIS using TMA and H_{2}O as precursor vapors to infiltrate a PS-b-PMMA micro-phase-separated substrate will form Al_{2}O_{3} specifically in the PMMA-enriched micro-phase subdomains. Subsequent removal of the PS-b-PMMA by using oxygen plasma or by annealing in air will convert the combined organic and inorganic mesoscale pattern into a purely inorganic Al_{2}O_{3} pattern that shares the mesoscale structure of the block copolymer but is more chemically and thermally robust.

== Applications ==
=== Lithography ===
SIS is capable of enhancing etch resistance in lithographic photo-resist, such as those used in photo-lithography, micro-fabrication, and nano-lithography. This method involves the sequential deposition of inorganic materials within a patterned resist's micro/nano-structures. By controlling the infiltration of these materials, SIS can engineer the chemical composition and density of the resist, thus enhancing its resistance to common etching processes. This allows for finer feature patterns and increased durability in micro-fabrication, which has advanced the capabilities of semiconductor manufacturing and nanotechnology applications. Another recent application for SIS in lithography is to enhance the optical absorption of the photo-resist in the extreme ultraviolet range to improve EUV lithography.

=== Surface coatings ===
SIS has applications in the field of surface coatings, particularly in the development of coatings with specific functional properties. With the sequential infiltration of different precursors into the material, SIS allows for the creation of coatings with enhanced properties and performance such as durability, corrosion resistance, eosinophilic,Lipophilicity, anti-reflection, and/or improved adhesion to substrates. Such an application of SIS can be used for protective coatings for metals, anti-fouling coatings for biomedical applications, and coatings for optical and electronic devices. In this application, the diffusion and reaction of the SIS precursors below the polymer surface facilitate a bulk-like transformation such that the effective thickness of the surface coating (e.g., several microns) is much larger than the film thickness that would result using the same number of atomic layer deposition (ALD) cycles on a conventional, dense substrate (e.g., a few nanometers).

=== Sensors and actuators ===
SIS, with its precise control over material properties, can be used to develop sensors and actuators. The functional layers created through the selective infiltration of specific precursors can enhance the sensitivity, selectivity, and response of sensors, which have applications in gas sensing, chemical sensing, biosensing, and environmental monitoring. SIS is also sued to engineer actuators with tunable properties, as it allows for the creation of devices on the micro and nano scales.

=== Energy devices ===
SIS has also shown promise in energy devices, especially in improving the performance and stability of energy storage and conversion systems. Employing SIS and the correct precursors, the technique can modify the surfaces and interfaces of materials used in batteries, super-capacitors, and fuel cells, enhancing charge transport, electrochemical stability, and energy density. SIS is also being explored for its applications in photovoltaics, in which it can be used to engineer interfaces and increase light absorption.

=== Biomedicine ===
SIS has been investigated for producing nanoporous inorganic materials with potential biomedical applications. For example, SIS has been used to produce nanoporous zinc oxide and aluminum oxide coatings that have been studied for biomedical applications.

=== Bio-materials ===
Modifying the mechanical properties of proteins is an early example of SIS application. For spider dragline silk, the toughness characteristic was significantly enhanced when metallic impurities, such as titanium or aluminum, infiltrated the fibers. This fiber doping using SIS techniques attempts to mimic the effect of metallic impurities on silk properties observed in nature.

== Limitations ==
One of the main challenges of SIS is the need to perform the process in an inert environment. Creation of a vacuum and/or introduction of inert gas carries costs that may be prohibitive for applications.

A second challenge lies in the inherent complexity of the diffusion-reaction process. The specifics of reactor configuration and process parameters significantly influence the final material properties, complicating process optimization, reproducibility, and scalability. While SIS is versatile and applicable to a broad range of materials, not all materials are compatible with this technique. The relatively slow diffusion rate of SIS precursor vapors through polymers can make the process time-intensive, particularly over macroscopic distances. For example, infiltrating millimeter-scale depths into a polymer may necessitate precursor exposure times of several hours. For comparison, ALD of thin films on dense surfaces that do not involve diffusion into the substrate would require exposure times of <1 s using the same precursors.
