= Seth Darling =

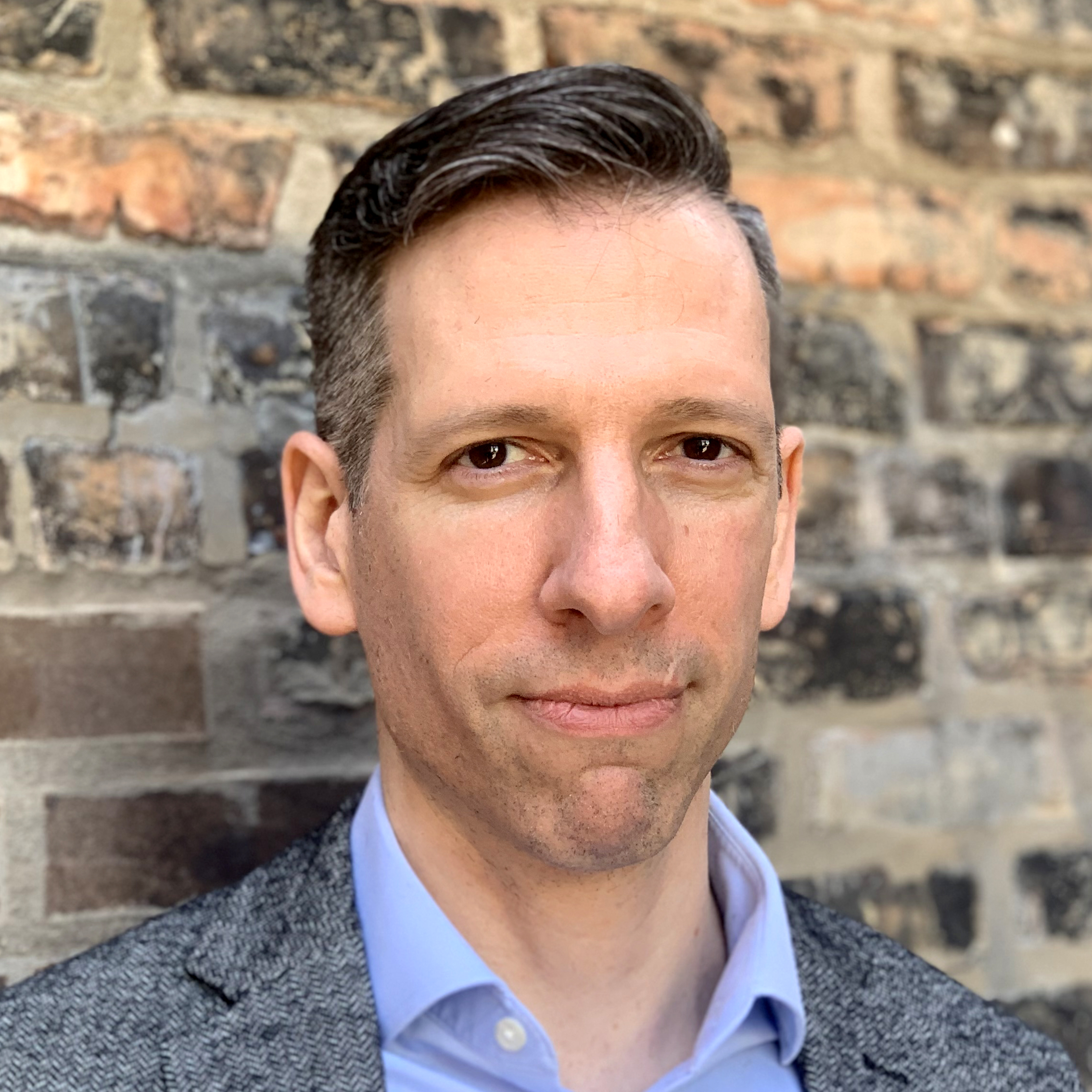
- Seth Darling in 2021
- Education: University of Chicago (PhD), Haverford College (BA)
- Occupation: Senior Scientist
- Organization(s): Argonne National Laboratory, University of Chicago
- Known for: Water/Energy Materials
- Awards: R&D 100 Award Winner (2017, 2014)
- Website: https://www.anl.gov/profile/seth-b-darling

Seth B. Darling is an Argonne Distinguished Fellow at the U.S. Department of Energy’s (DOE) Argonne National Laboratory and a Senior Scientist at the University of Chicago’s Pritzker School of Molecular Engineering. He previously served as the Chief Science & Technology Officer and interim Associate Laboratory Director of the Advanced Energy Technologies Directorate at Argonne National Laboratory and as director of the Center for Molecular Engineering, a research and development organization partnered with the University of Chicago focusing on advanced materials for cleaning water, quantum information science, and polymer science. He also directs the Advanced Materials for Energy-Water Systems (AMEWS) Center, a DOE Energy Frontier Research Center formed in 2018.

Darling has made contributions to the development of new materials for energy and water, including hybrid materials for polymer and perovskite solar cells and membrane materials for water filtration. He has co-created material synthesis techniques that are used commercially, including sequential infiltration synthesis (SIS), which is used to create coatings for semiconductor fabrication, membrane engineering, optical surfaces, and reusable oil sorbents.

== Career and education ==
Darling holds a PhD in physical chemistry from the University of Chicago and a bachelor’s degree in chemistry and astronomy from Haverford College. He completed his postdoctoral studies at Argonne as a Glenn T. Seaborg Fellow before joining its Center for Nanoscale Materials as a staff scientist. Darling was later promoted to director of the Institute for Molecular Engineering at Argonne, later renamed the Center for Molecular Engineering. In 2018, he became a senior scientist and was named director of the AMEWS Center. He achieved the rank of Argonne Distinguished Fellow in 2025.

Darling previously was the chief technical officer of Visual Molecules LLC, a position he held from 2008 until 2017.

== Major research contributions ==
Darling's research focuses on developing and studying advanced materials for applications in water treatment and other technological separations. Specifically, his group has developed coatings that offer both passive (adsorption prevention) and active (catalytic degradation) properties to mitigate membrane fouling, photothermal materials for wastewater treatment (a form of solar thermal energy), sorbents for selective removal of contaminants, and membranes for resource recovery from water with a focus on critical raw materials.

Darling has analyzed the behavior, commercial viability, scalability, and ecological impacts of photovoltaic technologies. This work reveals fundamental mechanisms of their operation and provides guidance on which solar energy technologies are sustainable and economical. Much of this work focused on the structure and properties of organic and hybrid materials. This includes polymer solar cells and perovskite solar cells.

Darling co-invented sequential infiltration synthesis (SIS) with Jeffrey Elam. SIS is a material synthesis technique derived from atomic layer deposition (ALD). SIS is sometimes referred to as vapor phase infiltration (VPI) or sequential vapor infiltration (SVI). While ALD alternates chemical vapors to grow materials one atomic layer at a time, in SIS the vapor is diffused into the polymer rather than on top of it. SIS has been used to create coatings for semiconductor fabrication and has applications in nanolithography (recognized with an R&D100 award in 2014), optical coatings, advanced sorbents, structural materials, chemically resistant materials, and membranes. SIS was also used to in the development of the Oleo Sponge to engineer a reusable oleophilic material that grabs oil molecules from water to mitigate oil spills.

Darling studied the directed self-assembly of polymers and polymer/nanoparticle hybrid systems. He’s investigated ways to tune the nanostructures that form when block copolymers self-assemble, in order to create useful materials for nanotechnologies and other applications. His most cited paper reviews methods to control the self-assembly of block copolymers and their application in microelectronics and other technologies.

== Book authorship ==
Darling has co-authored two books:

- Water Is...: The Indispensability of Water in Society and Life (with foreword by Seth M. Siegel); World Scientific Publishing Co (August 23, 2018)
- How to Change Minds About Our Changing Climate; The Experiment (July 29, 2014)

== Awards and honors ==
- Fellow, American Association for the Advancement of Science (AAAS), 2025
- Fellow, American Vacuum Society (AVS), 2024
- Researcher to Know, Illinois Science and Technology Coalition, 2022
- Samuel D. Bader Prize for Exceptional Achievement, 2017
- R&D 100 Award, Gold Special Recognition Award for Green Tech, and Editor’s Choice Award for Mechanical/Materials Research for Oleo Sponge, 2017
- R&D 100 Award for SIS lithography, 2014
- Argonne Energy Slam Champion, 2014
- Science Magazine Vizzie Award, 1st place, 2010
