= Carbon nanocone =

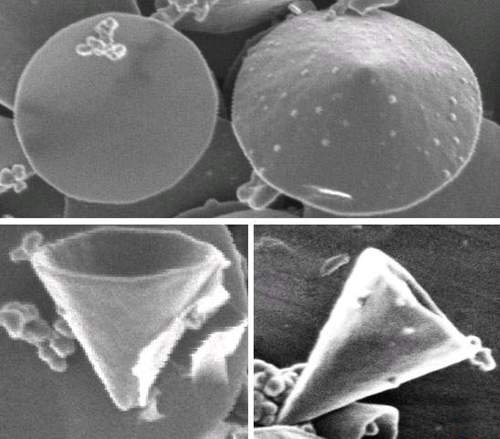
SEM images of a carbon disk (top left image) and free-standing hollow carbon nanocones produced by pyrolysis of heavy oil in the Kvaerner Carbon Black & Hydrogen Process. Maximum diameter is about 1 micrometer.

Carbon nanocones are conical structures which are made predominantly from carbon and which have at least one dimension of the order one micrometer or smaller. Nanocones have height and base diameter of the same order of magnitude; this distinguishes them from tipped nanowires, which are much longer than their diameter. Nanocones occur on the surface of natural graphite. Hollow carbon nanocones can also be produced by decomposing hydrocarbons with a plasma torch. Electron microscopy reveals that the opening angle (apex) of the cones is not arbitrary, but has preferred values of approximately 19°, 39°, 60°, 85° and 113°. This observation was explained by a model of the cone wall composed of wrapped graphene sheets, where the geometrical requirement for seamless connection naturally accounted for the semi-discrete character and the absolute values of the cone angle. A related carbon nanoform is the single-walled carbon nanohorn which typically form aggregates 80–100 nm in size.

== Free-standing hollow cones ==
=== History and synthesis ===
Carbon nanocones are produced in an industrial process that decomposes hydrocarbons into carbon and hydrogen with a plasma torch having a plasma temperature above 2000 °C. This method is often referred to as Kvaerner Carbon Black & Hydrogen Process (CBH) and it is relatively "emission-free", i.e., produces rather small amount of air pollutants. At certain well-optimized and patented conditions, the solid carbon output consists of approximately 20% carbon nanocones, 70% flat carbon discs, and 10% carbon black.

Plasma-assisted decomposition of hydrocarbons has long been known and applied, for example, for production of carbon fullerenes. Even if not optimized, it yields small amounts of carbon nanocones, which had been directly observed with an electron microscope already in 1994, and their atomic structure was modeled theoretically the same year.

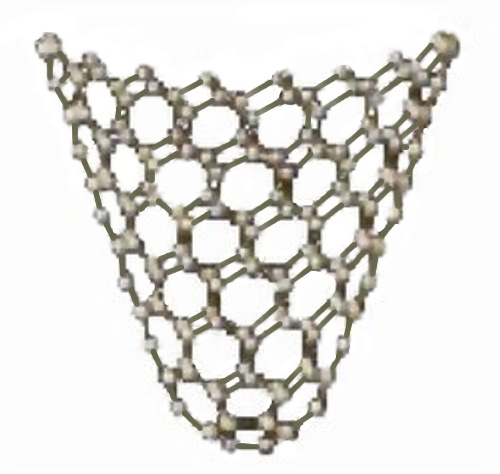
Atomic model of a cone with the 38.9° apex angle.

=== Modeling ===
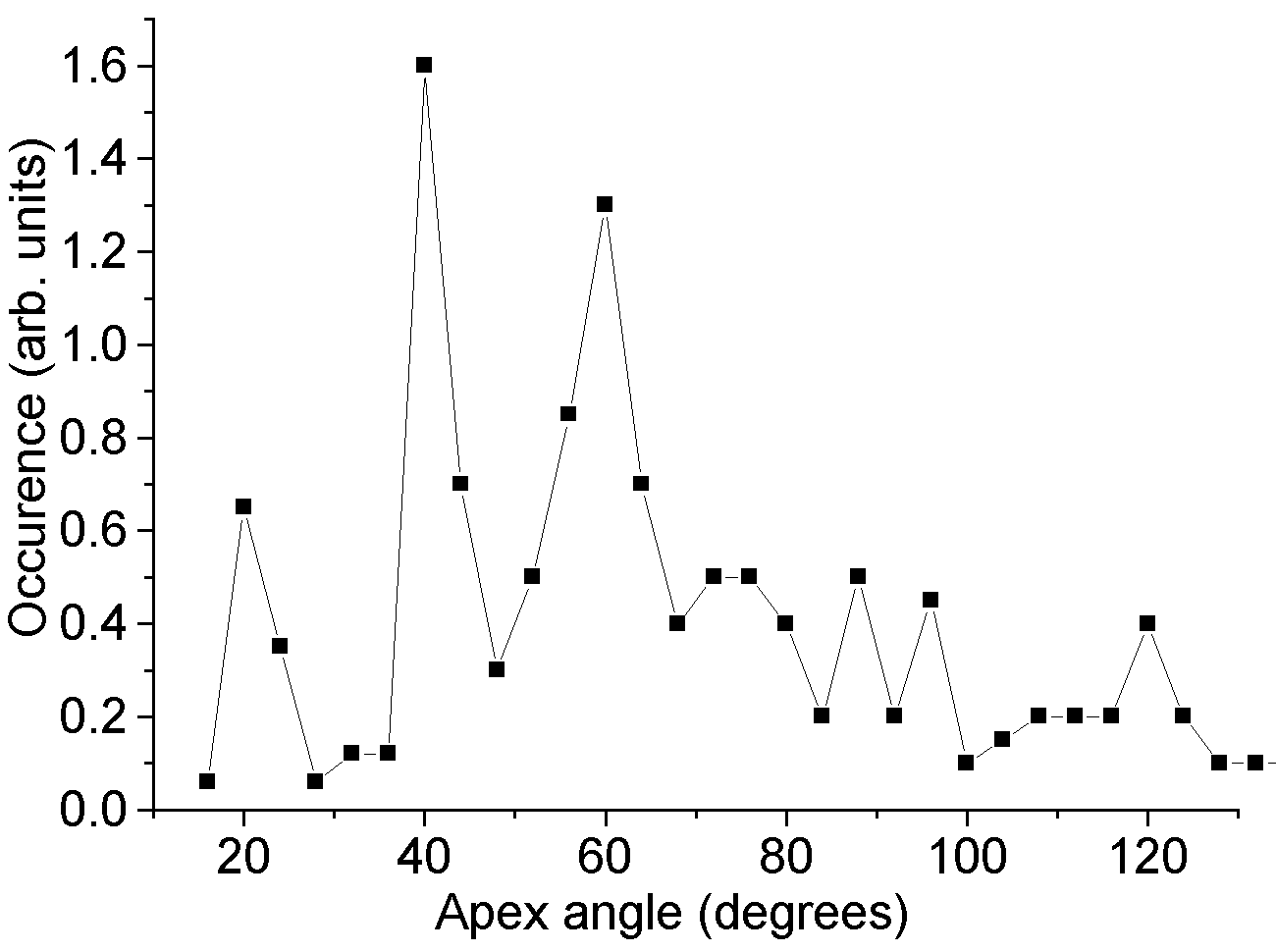
Statistical distribution of the apex values measured over 1700 hollow nanocones.

The open carbon cone can be modeled as a wrapped graphene sheet. In order to have strain-free, seamless wrapping, a sector must be cut out of the sheet. That sector should have an angle of n × 60°, where n = 1, ..., 5. Therefore, the resulting cone angle should have only certain, discrete values α = 2 arcsin(1 − n/6) = 112.9°, 83.6°, 60.0°, 38.9°, and 19.2° for n = 1, ..., 5, respectively. The graphene sheet is composed solely of carbon hexagons, which can not form a continuous cone cap. As in the fullerenes, pentagons must be added to form a curved cone tip, and their number is correspondingly n = 1, ..., 5.

=== Observation ===
Electron microscopy observations confirm the model prediction of discrete cone angles, though two experimental artifacts must be considered: charging of the poorly-conducting carbon samples under electron beam, which blurs the images, and that electron microscopy observations at a fixed sample tilt only yield a two-dimensional projection whereas a 3D shape is required. The first obstacle is overcome by coating the cones with a metal layer a few nanometers thick. The second problem is solved through a geometrical shape analysis. Combined with significant statistics on the number of cones, it yields semi-discrete apex angles. Their values deviate from prediction by about 10% due to the limited measurement accuracy and slight variation of the cone thickness along its length.

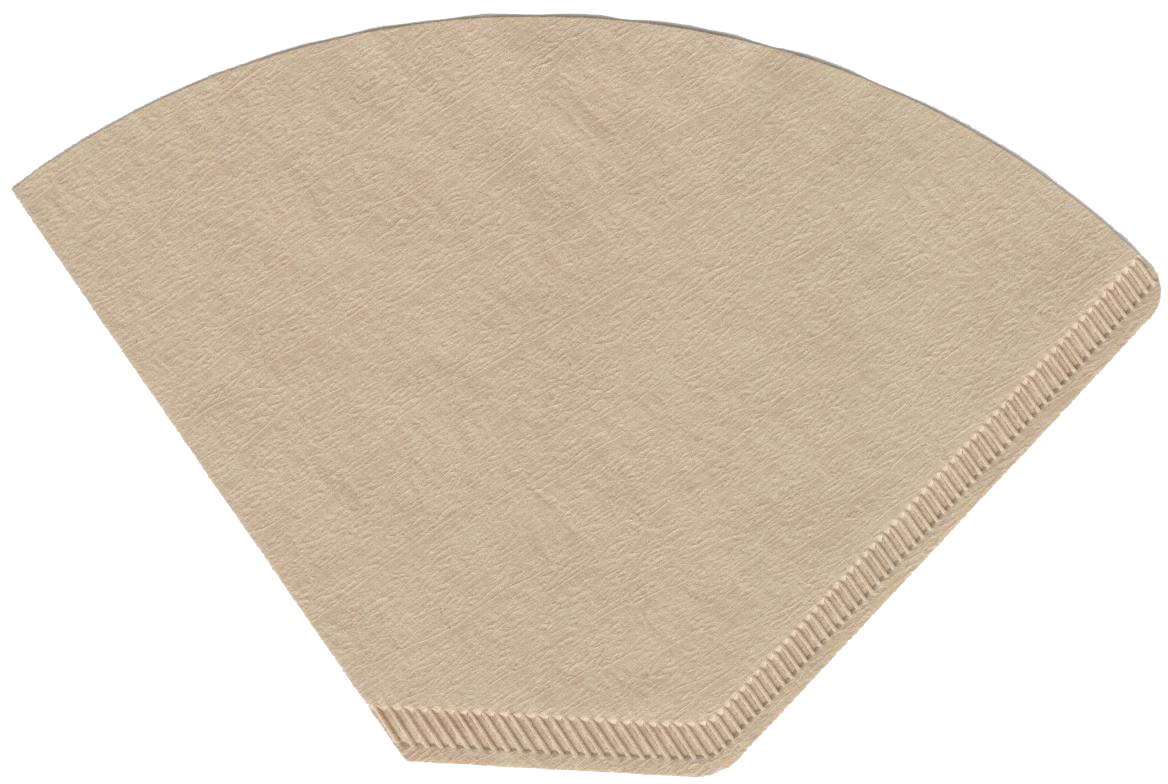
Image of a coffee filter illustrating one of the anomalous structures in the carbon nanocone growth.

The cone wall thickness varies between 10 and 30 nm, but can be as large as 80 nm for some nanocones. To elucidate the structure of the cone walls, electron diffraction patterns were recorded at different cone orientations. Their analysis suggests that the walls contain 10–30% ordered material covered with amorphous carbon. High-resolution electron microscopy reveals that the ordered phase consists of nearly-parallel layers of graphene. The amorphous fraction can be converted into well-ordered graphite by annealing the cones at temperatures near 2700 °C.

The remarkable feature of the open carbon nanocones produced by the CBH process is their almost ideal shape, with straight walls and circular bases. Non-ideal cones are also observed, but these are exceptions. One such deviation was a "double" cone, which appeared as if a cone started to grow from its tip with a certain apex angle (e.g. 84°), but then abruptly changed the apex angle (e.g. to 39°) at a single point on its surface, thus producing a break in the observed cross-section of the cone. Another anomaly was a cone with the apex extended from a point to a line segment, as in the expanded coffee filter (flat form is shown in the picture).

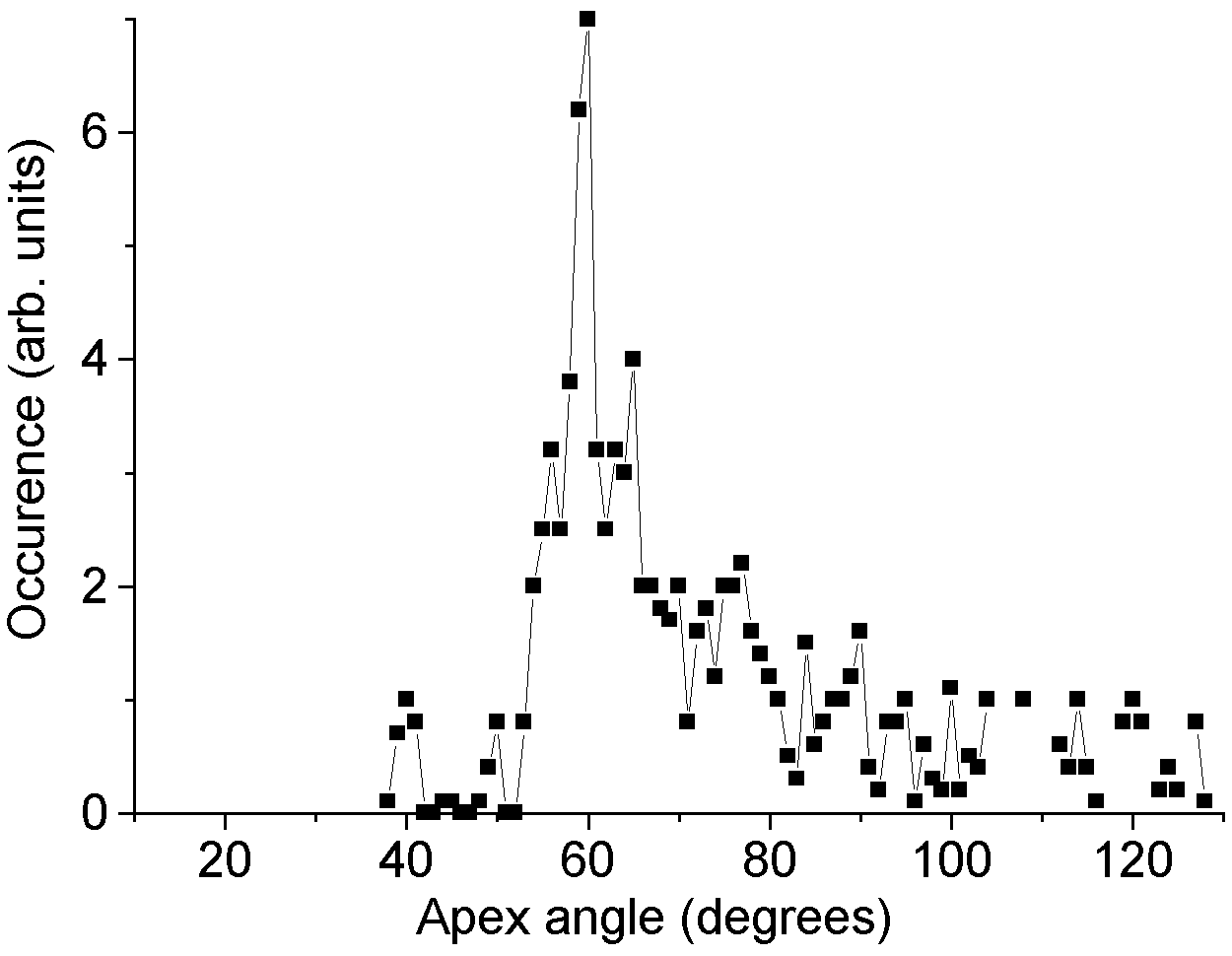
Statistical distribution of the apex values measured over 554 cones grown on natural graphite.

== Other cones ==
Carbon cones have also been observed, since 1968 or even earlier, on the surface of naturally occurring graphite. Their bases are attached to the graphite and their height varies between less than 1 and 40 micrometers. Their walls are often curved and are less regular than those of the laboratory-made nanocones. The distribution of their apex angle also shows a strong feature at 60°, but other expected peaks, at 20° and 40°, are much weaker, and the distribution is somewhat broader for large angles. This difference is attributed to the different wall structure of the natural cones. Those walls are relatively irregular and contain numerous line defects (positive-wedge disclinations). This breaks down the angular requirement for a seamless cone and therefore broadens the angular distribution.

== Potential applications ==
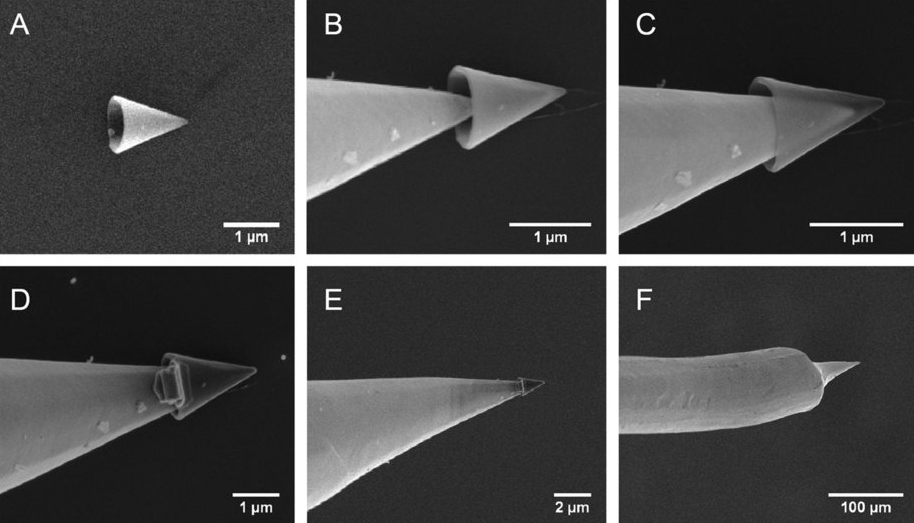
Sequential electron micrographs showing the process of capping a gold needle with a CBH carbon nanocone (top left)

Carbon nanocones have been used to cap ultrafine gold needles. Such needles are widely used in scanning probe microscopy owing to their high chemical stability and electrical conductivity, but their tips are prone to mechanical wear due to the high plasticity of gold. Adding a thin carbon cap mechanically stabilizes the tip without sacrificing its other properties.
