= Nanocomposite =

Solid material with nano-scale structure

Nanocomposite is a multiphase solid material where one of the phases has one, two or three dimensions of less than 100 nanometers (nm) or structures having nano-scale repeat distances between the different phases that make up the material.

In the broadest sense this definition can include porous media, colloids, gels and copolymers, but is more usually taken to mean the solid combination of a bulk matrix and nano-dimensional phase(s) differing in properties due to dissimilarities in structure and chemistry. The mechanical, electrical, thermal, optical, electrochemical, catalytic properties of the nanocomposite will differ markedly from that of the component materials. Size limits for these effects have been proposed:

1. <5 nm for catalytic activity
2. <20 nm for making a hard magnetic material soft
3. <50 nm for refractive index changes
4. <100 nm for achieving superparamagnetism, mechanical strengthening or restricting matrix dislocation movement

Nanocomposites are found in nature, for example in the structure of the abalone shell and bone. The use of nanoparticle-rich materials long predates the understanding of the physical and chemical nature of these materials. Jose-Yacaman et al. investigated the origin of the depth of colour and the resistance to acids and bio-corrosion of Maya blue paint, attributing it to a nanoparticle mechanism. From the mid-1950s nanoscale organo-clays have been used to control flow of polymer solutions (e.g. as paint viscosifiers) or the constitution of gels (e.g. as a thickening substance in cosmetics, keeping the preparations in homogeneous form). By the 1970s polymer/clay composites were the topic of textbooks, although the term "nanocomposites" was not in common use.

In mechanical terms, nanocomposites differ from conventional composite materials due to the exceptionally high surface to volume ratio of the reinforcing phase and/or its exceptionally high aspect ratio. The reinforcing material can be made up of particles (e.g. minerals), sheets (e.g. exfoliated clay stacks) or fibres (e.g. carbon nanotubes or electrospun fibres). The area of the interface between the matrix and reinforcement phase(s) is typically an order of magnitude greater than for conventional composite materials. The matrix material properties are significantly affected in the vicinity of the reinforcement. Ajayan et al. note that with polymer nanocomposites, properties related to local chemistry, degree of thermoset cure, polymer chain mobility, polymer chain conformation, degree of polymer chain ordering or crystallinity can all vary significantly and continuously from the interface with the reinforcement into the bulk of the matrix.

This large amount of reinforcement surface area means that a relatively small amount of nanoscale reinforcement can have an observable effect on the macroscale properties of the composite. For example, adding carbon nanotubes improves the electrical and thermal conductivity. Other kinds of nanoparticulates may result in enhanced optical properties, dielectric properties, heat resistance or mechanical properties such as stiffness, strength and resistance to wear and damage. In general, the nano reinforcement is dispersed into the matrix during processing. The percentage by weight (called mass fraction) of the nanoparticulates introduced can remain very low (on the order of 0.5% to 5%) due to the low filler percolation threshold, especially for the most commonly used non-spherical, high aspect ratio fillers (e.g. nanometer-thin platelets, such as clays, or nanometer-diameter cylinders, such as carbon nanotubes). The orientation and arrangement of asymmetric nanoparticles, thermal property mismatch at the interface, interface density per unit volume of nanocomposite, and polydispersity of nanoparticles significantly affect the effective thermal conductivity of nanocomposites.

== Ceramic-matrix nanocomposites ==
Ceramic matrix composites (CMCs) consist of ceramic fibers embedded in a ceramic matrix. The matrix and fibers can consist of any ceramic material, including carbon and carbon fibers. The ceramic occupying most of the volume is often from the group of oxides, such as nitrides, borides, silicides, whereas the second component is often a metal. Ideally both components are finely dispersed in each other in order to elicit particular optical, electrical and magnetic properties as well as tribological, corrosion-resistance and other protective properties.

The binary phase diagram of the mixture should be considered in designing ceramic-metal nanocomposites and measures have to be taken to avoid a chemical reaction between both components. The last point mainly is of importance for the metallic component that may easily react with the ceramic and thereby lose its metallic character. This is not an easily obeyed constraint because the preparation of the ceramic component generally requires high process temperatures. The safest measure thus is to carefully choose immiscible metal and ceramic phases. A good example of such a combination is represented by the ceramic-metal composite of TiO_{2} and Cu, the mixtures of which were found immiscible over large areas in the Gibbs' triangle of ' Cu-O-Ti.

The concept of ceramic-matrix nanocomposites was also applied to thin films that are solid layers of a few nm to some tens of μm thickness deposited upon an underlying substrate and that play an important role in the functionalization of technical surfaces. Gas flow sputtering by the hollow cathode technique turned out as a rather effective technique for the preparation of nanocomposite layers. The process operates as a vacuum-based deposition technique and is associated with high deposition rates up to some μm/s and the growth of nanoparticles in the gas phase. Nanocomposite layers in the ceramics range of composition were prepared from TiO_{2} and Cu by the hollow cathode technique that showed a high mechanical hardness, small coefficients of friction and a high resistance to corrosion.

== Metal-matrix nanocomposites ==
Metal matrix nanocomposites can also be defined as reinforced metal matrix composites. This type of composites can be classified as continuous and non-continuous reinforced materials. One of the more important nanocomposites is Carbon nanotube metal matrix composites, which is an emerging new material that is being developed to take advantage of the high tensile strength and electrical conductivity of carbon nanotube materials. Critical to the realization of CNT-MMC possessing optimal properties in these areas are the development of synthetic techniques that are (a) economically producible, (b) provide for a homogeneous dispersion of nanotubes in the metallic matrix, and (c) lead to strong interfacial adhesion between the metallic matrix and the carbon nanotubes. In addition to carbon nanotube metal matrix composites, boron nitride reinforced metal matrix composites and carbon nitride metal matrix composites are the new research areas on metal matrix nanocomposites.

A recent study, comparing the mechanical properties (Young's modulus, compressive yield strength, flexural modulus and flexural yield strength) of single- and multi-walled reinforced polymeric (polypropylene fumarate—PPF) nanocomposites to tungsten disulfide nanotubes reinforced PPF nanocomposites suggest that tungsten disulfide nanotubes reinforced PPF nanocomposites possess significantly higher mechanical properties and tungsten disulfide nanotubes are better reinforcing agents than carbon nanotubes. Increases in the mechanical properties can be attributed to a uniform dispersion of inorganic nanotubes in the polymer matrix (compared to carbon nanotubes that exist as micron sized aggregates) and increased crosslinking density of the polymer in the presence of tungsten disulfide nanotubes (increase in crosslinking density leads to an increase in the mechanical properties). These results suggest that inorganic nanomaterials, in general, may be better reinforcing agents compared to carbon nanotubes.

Another kind of nanocomposite is the energetic nanocomposite, generally as a hybrid sol–gel with a silica base, which, when combined with metal oxides and nano-scale aluminum powder, can form superthermite materials.

== Polymer-matrix nanocomposites ==
In the simplest case, appropriately adding nanoparticulates to a polymer matrix can enhance its performance, often dramatically, by simply capitalizing on the nature and properties of the nanoscale filler (these materials are better described by the term nanofilled polymer composites). This strategy is particularly effective in yielding high performance composites, when uniform dispersion of the filler is achieved and the properties of the nanoscale filler are substantially different or better than those of the matrix. The uniformity of the dispersion is in all nanocomposites is counteracted by thermodynamically driven phase separation. Clustering of nanoscale fillers produces aggregates that serve as structural defects and result in failure. Layer-by-layer (LbL) assembly when nanometer scale layers of nanoparticulates and a polymers are added one by one. LbL composites display performance parameters 10-1000 times better that the traditional nanocomposites made by extrusion or batch-mixing.

Nanoparticles such as graphene, carbon nanotubes, molybdenum disulfide and tungsten disulfide are being used as reinforcing agents to fabricate mechanically strong biodegradable polymeric nanocomposites for bone tissue engineering applications. The addition of these nanoparticles in the polymer matrix at low concentrations (~0.2 weight %) cause significant improvements in the compressive and flexural mechanical properties of polymeric nanocomposites. Potentially, these nanocomposites may be used as a novel, mechanically strong, light weight composite as bone implants. The results suggest that mechanical reinforcement is dependent on the nanostructure morphology, defects, dispersion of nanomaterials in the polymer matrix, and the cross-linking density of the polymer. In general, two-dimensional nanostructures can reinforce the polymer better than one-dimensional nanostructures, and inorganic nanomaterials are better reinforcing agents than carbon based nanomaterials. In addition to mechanical properties, polymer nanocomposites based on carbon nanotubes or graphene have been used to enhance a wide range of properties, giving rise to functional materials for a wide range of high added value applications in fields such as energy conversion and storage, sensing and biomedical tissue engineering. For example, multi-walled carbon nanotubes based polymer nanocomposites have been used for the enhancement of the electrical conductivity.

An alternative route to synthesis of nanocomposites is sequential infiltration synthesis, in which inorganic nanomaterials are grown within polymeric substrates using vapor-phase precursors that diffuse into the matrix. Furthermore, nanocomposites can be prepared via in situ generation of nanoparticles on and within polymeric materials, an approach that relies on the chemical transformation of suitable precursors to targeted nanoparticles synchronous with the build-up of the nanohybrid systems. The in situ-generated nanoparticles tend to nucleate and grow on the active sites of the macromolecular chains, showing strong adhesion on the polymeric host.

Nanoscale dispersion of filler or controlled nanostructures in the composite can introduce new physical properties and novel behaviors that are absent in the unfilled matrices. This effectively changes the nature of the original matrix (such composite materials can be better described by the term genuine nanocomposites or hybrids). Some examples of such new properties are fire resistance or flame retardancy, and accelerated biodegradability.

A range of polymeric nanocomposites are used for biomedical applications such as tissue engineering, drug delivery, cellular therapies. Due to unique interactions between polymer and nanoparticles, a range of property combinations can be engineered to mimic native tissue structure and properties. A range of natural and synthetic polymers are used to design polymeric nanocomposites for biomedical applications including starch, cellulose, alginate, chitosan, collagen, gelatin, and fibrin, poly(vinyl alcohol) (PVA), poly(ethylene glycol) (PEG), poly(caprolactone) (PCL), poly(lactic-co-glycolic acid) (PLGA), and poly(glycerol sebacate) (PGS). A range of nanoparticles including ceramic, polymeric, metal oxide and carbon-based nanomaterials are incorporated within polymeric network to obtain desired property combinations.

== Magnetic nanocomposites ==
Nanocomposites that can respond to an external stimulus are of increased interest due to the fact that, because of the large amount of interaction between the phase interfaces, the stimulus response can have a larger effect on the composite as a whole. The external stimulus can take many forms, such as a magnetic, electrical, or mechanical field. Specifically, magnetic nanocomposites are useful for use in these applications due to the nature of magnetic material's ability to respond both to electrical and magnetic stimuli. The penetration depth of a magnetic field is also high, leading to an increased area that the nanocomposite is affected by and therefore an increased response. In order to respond to a magnetic field, a matrix can be easily loaded with nanoparticles or nanorods The different morphologies for magnetic nanocomposite materials are vast, including matrix dispersed nanoparticles, core-shell nanoparticles, colloidal crystals, macroscale spheres, or Janus-type nanostructures.

Magnetic nanocomposites can be utilized in a vast number of applications, including catalytic, medical, and technical. For example, palladium is a common transition metal used in catalysis reactions. Magnetic nanoparticle-supported palladium complexes can be used in catalysis to increase the efficiency of the palladium in the reaction.

Magnetic nanocomposites can also be utilized in the medical field, with magnetic nanorods embedded in a polymer matrix can aid in more precise drug delivery and release. Finally, magnetic nanocomposites can be used in high frequency/high-temperature applications. For example, multi-layer structures can be fabricated for use in electronic applications. An electrodeposited Fe/Fe oxide multi-layered sample can be an example of this application of magnetic nanocomposites.

In applications such as power micro-inductors where high magnetic permeability is desired at high operating frequencies. The traditional micro-fabricated magnetic core materials see both decrease in permeability and high losses at high operating frequency. In this case, magnetic nano composites have great potential for improving the efficiency of power electronic devices by providing relatively high permeability and low losses. For example, As Iron oxide nano particles embedded in Ni matrix enables us to mitigate those losses at high frequency. The high resistive iron oxide nanoparticles helps to reduce the eddy current losses where as the Ni metal helps in attaining high permeability. DC magnetic properties such as Saturation magnetization lies between each of its constituent parts indicating that the physical properties of the materials can be altered by creating these nanocomposites.

== See also ==
- Hybrid materials
- Aquamelt
