= Steven M. George =

Steven M. George from the University of Colorado, Boulder, was awarded the status of Fellow in the American Physical Society, after they were nominated by their Division of Chemical Physics in 1997, for "advancements in our understanding of gas-surface energy transfer dynamics, surface kinetics and diffusion processes, environmental chemistry at gas-surface interfaces, heterogeneous catalysis, and chemically controlled eptiaxy of novel thin film materials."

== See also ==
- List of fellows of the American Physical Society (1972–1997)
