= Harry Waris =

Finnish botanist (1893–1973)

Harry Ilmari Waris
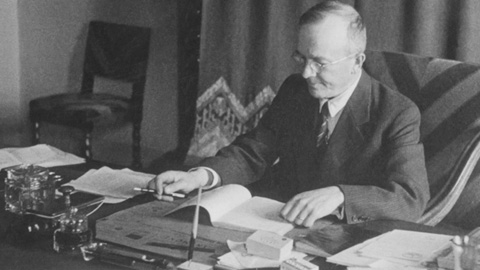
- Waris at his study in 1948
- Born: Harry Warén; 5 May 1893; Saarijärvi, Finland
- Died: 22 November 1973 (aged 80); Helsinki, Finland
- Education: University of Helsinki
- Scientific career
- Fields: Plant physiology, phycology, lichenology
- Author abbrev. (botany): Warén

Harry Ilmari Waris (until 1935 Warén; born 5 May 1893 in Saarijärvi; died 22 November 1973 in Helsinki) was a Finnish botanist. He worked across several branches of botany, with major contributions to lichenology, phycology, and developmental plant physiology. His 1920 thesis on lichen gonidia (the symbiotic algal cells within lichens) was among the first to use axenic culture for lichen algae, detailing methods for isolation, cultivation, and nitrogen utilisation. His work with the desmid genus Micrasterias informed studies of cell morphology, including the roles of the nucleus and cytoplasm in shaping developing cells. In 1953 he devised an inorganic nutrient medium (often called Waris's MY medium) for desmids, which remains in use in physiological and experimental phycology. He also reported early observations of somatic embryogenesis in Oenanthe aquatica, work that preceded later studies in the field and is part of the history of developmental plant physiology.

== Early life and education ==
Harry Warén was born on 5 May 1893 in Saarijärvi, Central Finland. In 1935 he Finnicised his surname from Warén to Waris. He was the son of Eliel Warén (1859–1928), a physician, and Elina Ignatius (1867–1926), who hailed from a prominent academic family. Warén received his early education at the Finnish Normal Lyceum in Helsinki, a public school known for its high academic standards. In 1911, Warén enrolled at the University of Helsinki to study biology, with a focus on botany. He earned his master's degree in 1916. During his studies, he was greatly influenced by professor Fredrik Elfving, the head of the Botanical Institute. Elfving had introduced mandatory laboratory courses in plant physiology, which inspired many students, including Warén, to pursue advanced research in the field. Warén's Ph.D. thesis, titled Reinkulturen von Flechtengonidien ('Axenic Cultures of Lichen Gonidia'), was completed in 1920 and marked a pioneering contribution to lichenology. Although Elfving disagreed with Simon Schwendener's 1872 theory that lichens are composite organisms, Warén's cultivation of the algal component supported Schwendener's view; their working relationship nevertheless remained collegial.

Warén began his professional career as a botanist with the Finnish Society of Peatland Cultivation, where he worked from 1919 to 1927. His role involved assessing the suitability of peatlands for agricultural use. This period allowed him to gain extensive knowledge of Nordic vegetation, particularly the identification of challenging Sphagnum species and numerous vascular plants of wet habitats. He applied this expertise in various experiments involving the cultivation of whole seed plants under aseptic conditions. He also published several phytosociological papers on peatland vegetation, which included analyses of soil chemical composition, in the mid-1920s.

== Career ==
=== Professor and Rector at Turku University ===
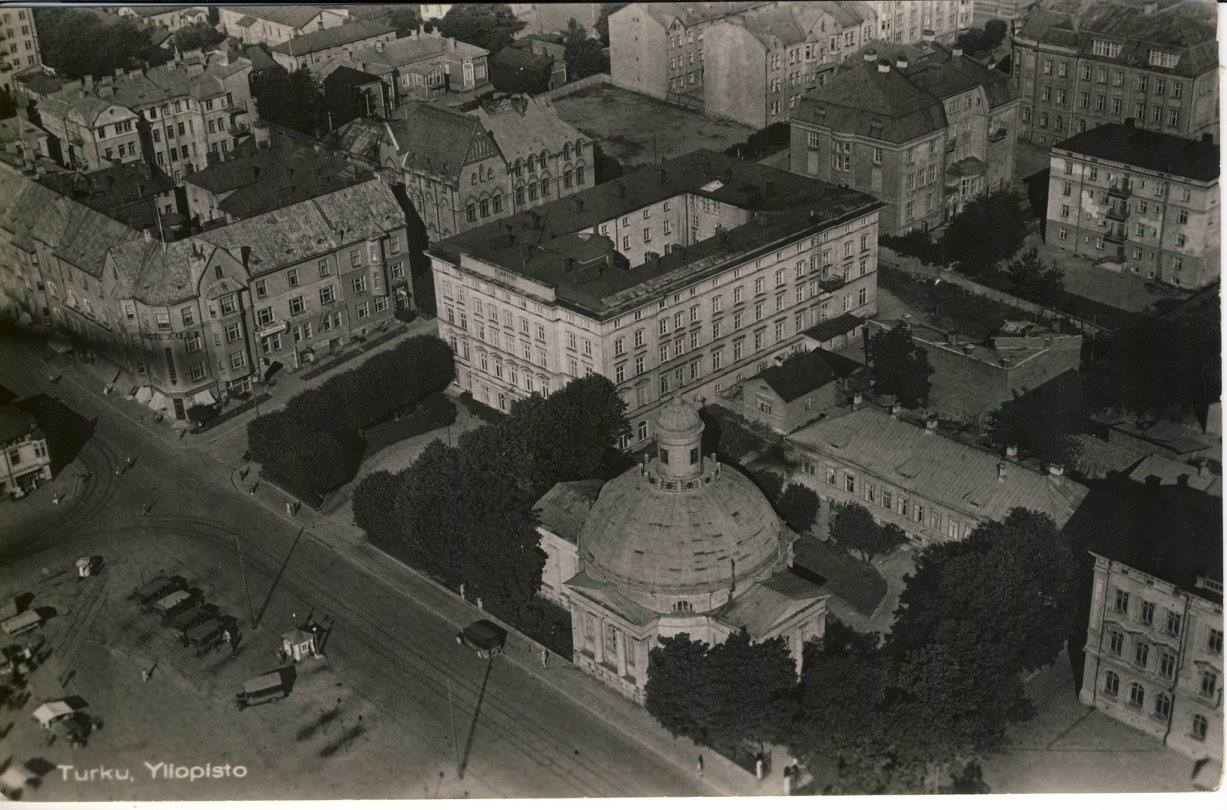
University of Turku, photographed in 1935

In 1927, Warén moved to Turku, where he became a professor of botany at the University of Turku. For several years, he was the university's only botanist. He was awarded a Rockefeller Foundation fellowship from 1929 to 1930, allowing him to work at the Pflanzenphysiologisches Institut of the Deutsche Karls‑Universität in Prague. During this time, he focused on the developmental physiology of Micrasterias algae, an area of study that had also interested his mentor, Professor Elfving. Warén's innovative experimental techniques and meticulous microscopic observations provided new insights into cell development.

In 1941, Waris was elected vice‑rector of the University of Turku; he served as rector from 1945 to 1948. The challenging responsibilities and economic difficulties faced by universities during and after World War II required much of his attention, leading to interruptions in his research. The war caused a significant reduction in the number of active students and faculty, as young men were conscripted into the army and women and older men participated in civil service. Despite these constraints, courses in plant anatomy and physiology continued in Turku. He led an excursion to East Karelia to collect material for the university's botanical garden. In 1947, he was honoured with full membership in the Finnish Academy of Science and Letters.

The establishment of the Scandinavian Plant Physiology Society in 1949 motivated Waris to resume his cytophysiological studies on Micrasterias. By 1950, he had developed the concept of the cytoplasmic framework, although electron microscopy at the time did not yet reveal this structure due to limitations in fixation methods. Following the war, Waris began publishing his research in English, primarily in the journal Physiologia Plantarum.

=== Professor at the University of Helsinki ===
From 1953 to 1972, Waris investigated morphogenesis in Micrasterias at the University of Helsinki. He acquired new equipment, particularly microscopes, and supervised the PhD thesis of Paavo Kallio on Micrasterias morphogenesis. Their collaboration extended over many years, contributing to research on desmid morphogenesis. They co-authored numerous papers, including notable publications in 1957, 1964, and 1972. As a member of the Finnish Academy of Sciences and Letter, Waris had ample opportunities to present and publish his findings in the academy's biological series, Annales Academiae Scientiarum Fennicae.

Waris was president of the Scandinavian Plant Physiology Society from 1961 to 1964.

== Research ==
=== Field research ===
During the Second World War, Harry Waris contributed to the botanical study of mires in the Olonets region of Russian Karelia. In the summers of 1942 and 1943, Waris, alongside Jukka Lounamaa, conducted extensive research on the rich fens around Kolatselkä and Vieljärvi. They documented nearly 50 mires, many of which were classified as rich fens due to the calcareous bedrock. This led to the discovery of various rare plant species in southern boreal Fennoscandia.

Waris's Karelia expeditions, organised under the State Scientific Commission for East Karelia – a wartime initiative to survey the natural history of occupied regions – documented nearly 50 mire sites and yielded collections of rare fen plants including Ligularia sibirica, Thelypteris palustris, Tofieldia pusilla, several Carex species, and Aconitum lycoctonum (northern wolf's bane). These records have informed subsequent ecological assessments and conservation of rich fens in southern Finland.

=== Somatic embryogenesis ===
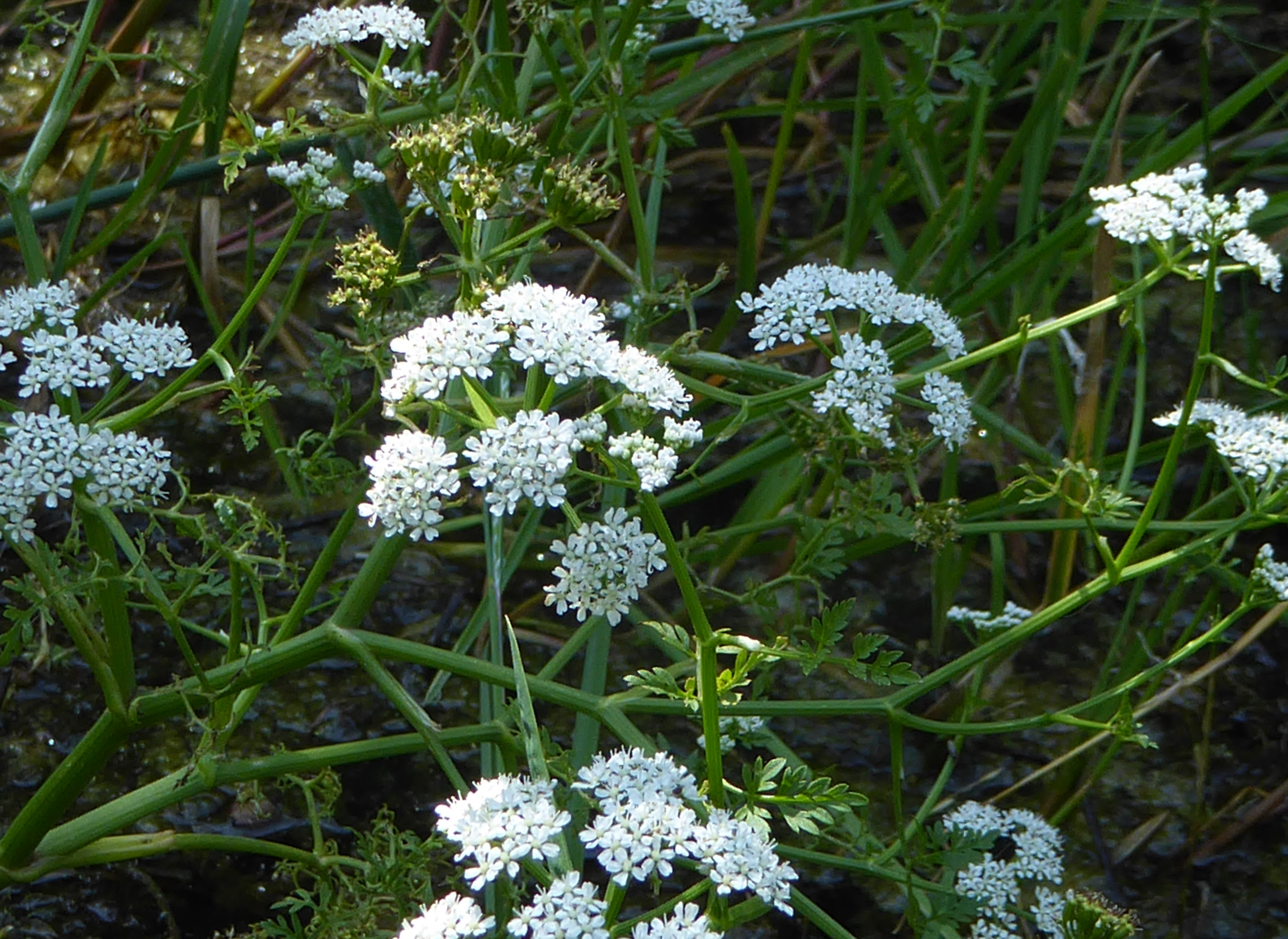
Waris researched somatic embryogenesis using Oenanthe aquatica, an aquatic flowering plant in the carrot family.

Waris's research in Helsinki focused on the developmental physiology of plants, particularly through aseptic cultures of angiosperms. His interest in nitrogen metabolism led him to explore the effects of amino acids on plant growth and development. Waris was intrigued by the phenomenon where the addition of amino acids could alter plant morphogenesis, sometimes mimicking the effects of plant hormones. His work demonstrated that amino acids could both stimulate and inhibit various phases of plant organ development, depending on their concentration and combination. His research on Oenanthe aquatica revealed that plants initially growing normally later developed abnormal growth, with new plantlets emerging from minute grains formed by the original plant's root tips. These observations informed later work on chemically induced morphogenesis in angiosperms.

Waris was among the early researchers to report observations of somatic embryogenesis in vitro. He found that vegetative cells from aseptically germinated seedlings of Oenanthe aquatica could produce embryo-like structures under specific nutrient conditions designed to foster imbalances in protein metabolism, without the addition of exogenous plant hormones. These new plantlets, which he termed "neomorphs," emerged from root tips of morbid plants and continued to reproduce from colourless outgrowths of leaf epidermis, eventually developing into seedling-like forms when transferred to a glycine-free medium.

Waris's work contributed to the understanding of somatic embryogenesis. Although his discoveries did not receive the same level of attention as those of Frederick Campion Steward and John Reinert, they were crucial in demonstrating that somatic cells could produce embryos, providing insights into cellular differentiation mechanisms. Waris's research highlighted the role of amino acids in inducing morphogenetic changes and contributed to the groundwork for subsequent studies on plant development and tissue culture.

=== Neomorphs ===
Waris introduced the concept of "neomorphs" and "neomorphosis" to describe novel, seedling-like structures that emerged from aseptic cultures of Oenanthe aquatica when exposed to specific amino acids. His experiments showed that glycine and other amino acids could induce both reversible and irreversible morphogenetic effects. For instance, glycine at moderate concentrations led to the formation of juvenile plantlets that could reproduce vegetatively, while leucine at critical concentrations caused irreversible changes, resulting in callus-like structures capable of indefinite vegetative reproduction. These findings suggested possible applications in plant breeding and provided insights on metabolic controls of development. Although initially met with some skepticism, these terms and concepts eventually gained acceptance within the scientific community.

Waris observed that Oenanthe lachenalii could undergo reversible morphogenesis when exposed to moderate glycine levels, resulting in juvenile plantlets capable of further development into mature plants. Conversely, high leucine concentrations caused irreversible morphogenetic changes, producing new plant types with unique vegetative reproduction capabilities. These discoveries emphasised the influence of amino acids on plant development and opened new avenues for research in plant physiology.

=== Developmental botany ===
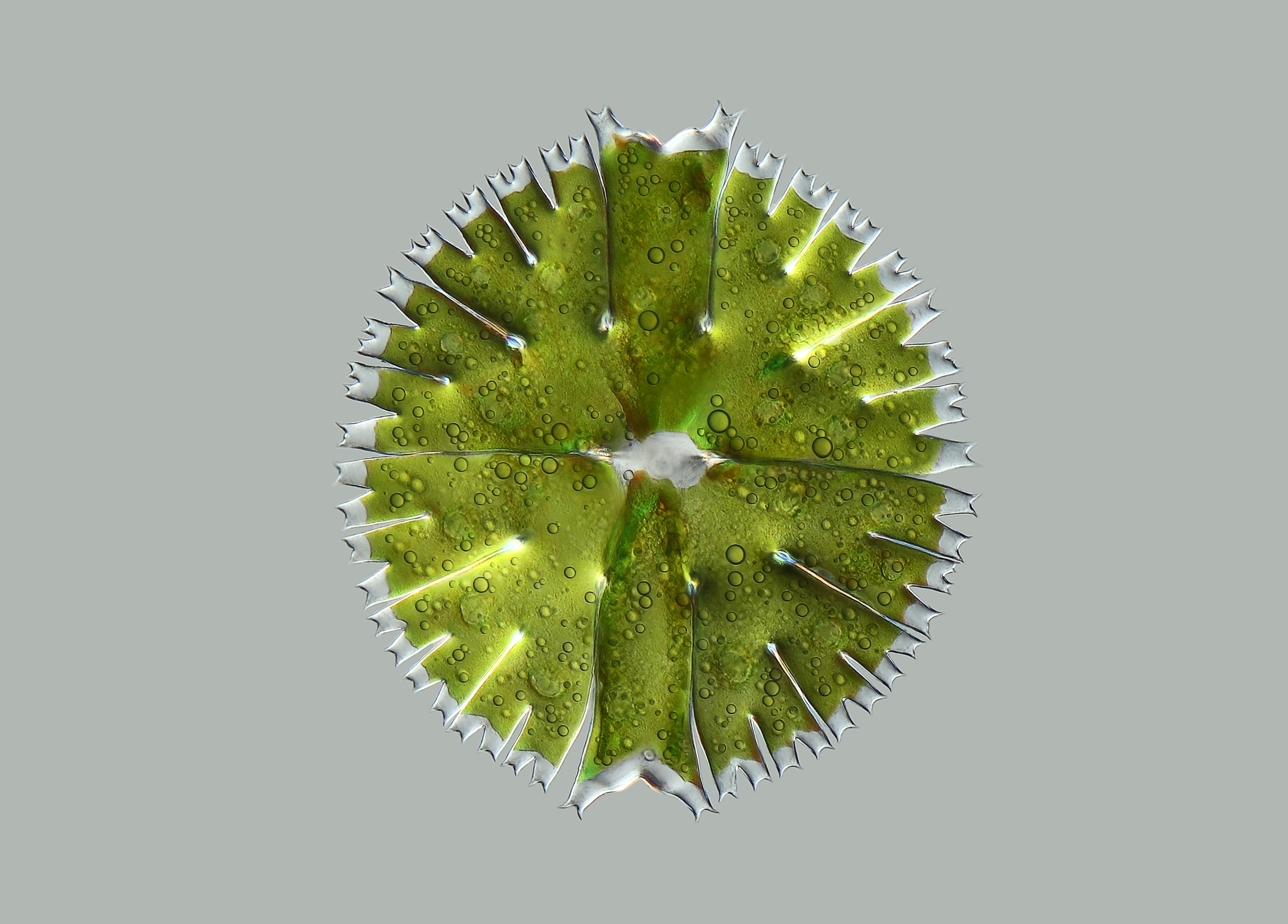
Micrasterias rotata, a model alga in Waris's studies of cell morphogenesis

Waris investigated plant morphogenesis throughout his career. He examined cytoplasmic organisation in Micrasterias and the effects of amino acids on seed plants, and he continued publishing on these topics after retirement.

Waris's investigations extended to the study of cell differentiation in Micrasterias algae, where he explored the symmetry and asymmetry of cell shapes, even in enucleate cells. His work with purines and pyrimidines further contributed to understanding the factors influencing morphogenesis. His work drew attention in specialised circles, though it received less visibility than that of some contemporaries. Nonetheless, his innovative approach and meticulous research have left a lasting impact on developmental botany.

== Personal ==
Waris married Anna Martta Oesch (1897–1984).

== Awards and honours ==
For service in the 1918 Finnish Civil War, Waris received the Medal of Liberty, 2nd Class, and the Commemorative Medal of the War of Independence. During the Second World War he was awarded the Winter War Medal.

Waris was appointed a Commander of the Order of the Lion of Finland in 1944. In 1947 he was elected a full member of the Finnish Academy of Science and Letters.

== Legacy ==
Waris's influence persists in phycology through the culture techniques he developed. In 1953, he formulated an inorganic nutrient medium (often referred to as Waris's MY medium) specifically to cultivate desmids (microscopic algae) under laboratory conditions. This medium, notable for its inclusion of chelating agents, remains a standard, and is still used for growing desmids in vitro.

== Selected publications ==
- Warén, H. (1920). Reinkulturen von Flechtengonidien [Pure cultures of lichen gonidia]. Helsinki: Akademische Abhandlung, Universität Helsingfors. p. 79.
- Warén, H. (1933). "Über die Rolle des Callciums im leben der Zelle auf Grund von Versuchen an Micrasterias" [On the role of calcium in the life of the cell based on experiments with Micrasterias]. Planta (in German). 19 (1): 1–45. Bibcode:1933Plant..19....1W. doi:10.1007/BF01937555.
- Waris, H.; Lounamaa, J. (1942). Suotutkimukset Itä-Karjalassa kesällä 1942: Kenttämuistiinpanot [Mire studies in Eastern Karelia in the summer of 1942] (Report) (in Finnish). Floristic archive, Central Museum of Natural History, Helsinki University. pp. 1–50.
- Waris, Harry (1953). "The significance for algae of chelating substances in the nutrient solutions". Physiologia Plantarum. 6 (3): 538–543. Bibcode:1953PPlan...6..538W. doi:10.1111/j.1399-3054.1953.tb08411.x.
- Waris, Harry (1967). Morphological changes in seed plants induced with amino acids, purines and pyrimidines. Annales Academia Scientiarum Fennicae. Ser. A IV, Biologica. Vol. 106. pp. 1–66.
