= 1451 Granö =

Main-belt asteroid

Discovery
- Discovered by: Y. Väisälä
- Discovery site: Turku Obs.
- Discovery date: 22 February 1938

Designations
- Named after: Johannes Gabriel Granö (University of Turku)
- Alternative designations: 1938 DT · 1976 WK
- Minor planet category: main-belt · Flora

Orbital characteristics
- Epoch 4 September 2017 (JD 2458000.5)
- Uncertainty parameter 0
- Observation arc: 56.21 yr (20,532 days)
- Aphelion: 2.4619 AU
- Perihelion: 1.9442 AU
- Semi-major axis: 2.2030 AU
- Eccentricity: 0.1175
- Orbital period (sidereal): 3.27 yr (1,194 days)
- Mean anomaly: 60.928°
- Mean motion: 0° 18^{m} 5.04^{s} / day
- Inclination: 5.1087°
- Longitude of ascending node: 175.29°
- Argument of perihelion: 51.858°

Physical characteristics
- Dimensions: 6.170±0.072; 6.329±0.037 km 6.81 km (calculated); 9.70±0.57 km
- Synodic rotation period: 5.109 h (removed) (Note: Geneva Obs. Behrend (2007) web: rotation period 5.109±0.004 hours with a brightness amplitude of 0.06 mag. Summary figures for (1451) Grano at Collaborative Asteroid Lightcurve Link (CALL). Results are no longer published on website, see: Asteroids and comets rotation curves CdR – Observatoire de Genève, Raoul Behrend); 138±0.05 h
- Geometric albedo: 0.171±0.022; 0.20 (assumed); 0.4034±0.0919; 0.429±0.077
- Spectral type: S
- Absolute magnitude (H): 12.6 · 13.2 · 14.19±0.95

1451 Granö, provisional designation 1938 DT, is a stony Florian asteroid and slow rotator from the inner regions of the asteroid belt, approximately 6.5 kilometers in diameter. It was discovered on 22 February 1938, by Finnish astronomer Yrjö Väisälä at Turku Observatory in Southwest Finland, and later named for Johannes Gabriel Granö, rector of the University of Turku.

== Orbit and classification ==
The asteroid is a member of the Flora family, a large group of stony S-type asteroids in the main-belt. It orbits the Sun in the inner main-belt at a distance of 1.9–2.5 AU once every 3 years and 3 months (1,194 days). Its orbit has an eccentricity of 0.12 and an inclination of 5° with respect to the ecliptic. As no precoveries were taken, and no previous identifications were made, Granö's observation arc begins with its official discovery observation in 1938.

== Physical characteristics ==
=== Slow rotator ===
A rotational lightcurve of Granö was obtained from photometric observations made by amateur astronomer Robert Stephens at GMARS and Santana Observatories in March 2010. Analysis gave a long rotation period of 138 hours with a brightness variation of 0.65 magnitude (U=2+). This makes Granö a slow rotating asteroid. The result supersedes a previous period of 5.1 hours from May 2007 (U=2-).

=== Diameter and albedo ===
According to the surveys carried out by the Japanese Akari satellite and NASA's Wide-field Infrared Survey Explorer with its subsequent NEOWISE mission, Granö measures between 6.17 and 9.70 kilometers in diameter, and its surface has an albedo between 0.171 and 0.429. The Collaborative Asteroid Lightcurve Link assumes a standard albedo for stony asteroids of 0.20 and calculates a diameter of 6.81 kilometers using an absolute magnitude of 13.2.

== Naming ==
This minor planet was named after Johannes Gabriel Granö (1882−1956), Finnish professor of geography and rector at University of Turku from 1932 to 1934. The official naming citation was published by the Minor Planet Center on 30 January 1964 (M.P.C. 2277).
