= SPPS =

SPPS can refer to:

- Saint Paul Public Schools
- Solid phase peptide synthesis
- Solution precursor plasma spray
- Steam Powered Preservation Society
- South Park Primary School, a primary school in London, United Kingdom
- Scandinavian Plant Physiology Society
- Social Psychological and Personality Science, a quarterly academic journal for social and personality psychology-related topics
- Spectral Parameter Power Series, a method for solving Sturm–Liouville equations
- Super Proton-Antiproton Collider (Spp̅S), a modification of the Super Proton Synchrotron, an accelerator at CERN
