= Johannes Gabriel Granö =

Finnish geographer (1882–1956)

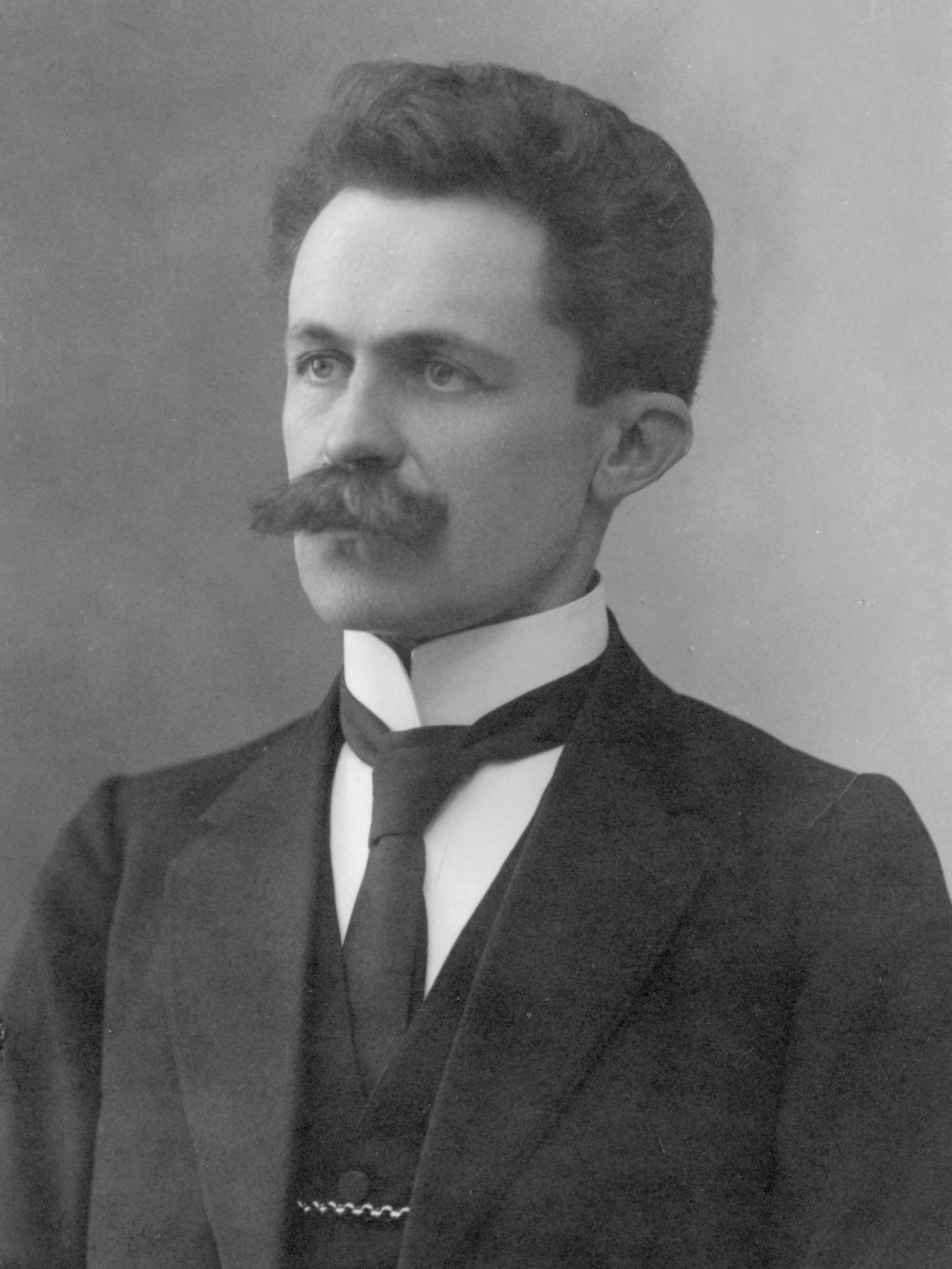
- Granö in the 1920s
- Born: 14 March 1882; Lapua, Finland
- Died: 23 February 1956 (aged 73); Helsinki, Finland
- Education: University of Helsinki
- Known for: Pure Geography
- Scientific career
- Fields: Geography
- Workplaces: University of Tartu; University of Helsinki; University of Turku

Johannes Gabriel Granö (14 March 1882 – 23 February 1956) was a Finnish geographer, chiefly remembered as a professor of three universities and an explorer of Siberia and Mongolia. He is also noted for his pioneering studies on landscape geography, and his book Pure Geography. Granö was a professor in universities of Tartu, Helsinki, and Turku.

Granö studied in Helsinki University, starting 1900 in botany but changing his major subject to geography. His minor subjects were biology and geology. As a young student he spent his vacations in Siberia, where his father worked as the priest for the Finnish population in Omsk 1901–1913. Granö took notes of the environment and his first scientific publication, published 1905 in "Fennia" was about the Finnish colonies in Siberia.

Granö received stipends from the Fenno-Ugrian Society and carried out three exploration trips to northern Mongolia, the Altai Mountains, and the Sayan Mountains in 1906, 1907, and 1909. His research focused gradually on the effects of the ice age in the morphology of the mountains.

Granö became a professor at the University of Tartu in 1919. He founded the department and organised teaching in Estonian. In 1923 he was invited back to Helsinki University to be a professor and the editor of Atlas of Finland. He was soon asked to move to Turku where they had founded a Finnish university. There he even had time for his own research. He was chancellor of the University of Turku from 1945 to 1955.

Granö developed the concept of "pure geography" as the unique subject of geographical research. He created a working methodology to define and classify landscapes, not only based on geomorphology but also taking into account bodies of water, vegetation and human impact. As the research object of his "pure geography" he had human perception, which was unique in geography those days.

Granö published a lot of his works in German, and thus he was in his lifetime best known in German-speaking areas. Only during First World War he published something in French. In the 1990s however, his main work Pure Geography was translated in English. This was because his ideas on human perception a starting point of geographical research introduced in Pure Geography were known to have influenced the emergence of humanistic geography and behavioral geography in the 1960s and 1970s.

Photographs taken by Granö in connection with his fieldwork in the Altai Mountains of Central Asia, among colonies of Finnish settlers in Siberia, on the steppes of Western Siberia and in Mongolia, particularly with the purpose of studying the inhabitants of these areas, have been donated to the Finnish Literature Society and a selection of them was featured in an exhibition in Helsinki City Art Museum in 2002.

== Notable publications ==
- Pure Geography, 1929, translation in English 1997
- Altai I-II, 1919–1921, with photographs by the author, republished in 1993. Translations in Swedish and Russian.
- Beiträge zur Kenntnis der Eiszeit in der nordwestlichen Mongolei und einigen ihrer südsibirischen Grenzgebirge (doctors thesis 1910)
- Die Nordwest-Mongolei (in "Zeitschrift der Gesellschaft für Erdkunde", 1912)
- Morphologische Forschungen im östlichen Altai (in "Zeitschrift der Gesellschaft für Erdkunde", 1914)
- Les formes du relief dans l'Altai russe et leur genése (in "Fennia" 1917)
- Die landschaftlischen Einheiten Estlands (1922)
- Reine Geographie (1929, Finnish Puhdas maantiede 1930, English Pure Geography 1997)
- Die geographischen Gebiete Finnlands (1931)
- Mongolische Landschaften und Örtlichkeiten (1941)
- Das Formengebäude des nord-östlischen Altai (1945)

== Awards and honours ==
Asteroid 1451 Granö was named after Granö. The co-operation centre of the University of Turku and the University of Tartu is called named Granö Centre after J. G. Granö, former rector of Turku University and professor of geography at the University of Tartu.
