= Jaakko Nousiainen =

Finnish political scientist (1931–2022)

Jaakko Nousiainen (20 December 1931 – 24 March 2022) was a Finnish academic who was a professor of political science, and has served as a chancellor of the University of Turku. He graduated as a student in the Joensuu lyseon, in 1950. He was a doctoral student at the University of Helsinki, in 1959. In his doctoral dissertation, he studied Communist support in the municipality of Kuopio. An expert in Finland politics and government, Nousiainen analyzed the basis of Communism's support and distinguished Communism between Communist rural and Communist urban areas.

== Life and career ==
Jaakko Nousiainen was born in Pälkjärvi on 20 December 1931. From 1953 to 1960, Nousiainen worked at the Finnish Information Office. Between 1961 and 1963 he served as associate professor of social sciences at the University of Education of Jyväskylä. From there, he moved to the post of Professor of Political Science at the University of Turku in 1963. In this position, Nousiainen worked for over 30 years. His last years at the University of Turku Nousiainen served as a Chancellor of the university in 1994–1997.

After moving to Turku, he focused on research into Finnish state institutions in research. Over the next thirty years, he has published several books and articles in the area. Nousiainen has been a key player in the development of the so-called Turku School of Political Studies. The school has profoundly profiled research into political institutions and comparative research of political systems.

Between 1967 and 1968 and 1972–1973, Nousiainen served as dean of the Faculty of Social Sciences at the University of Turku as deputy rector of the university in 1975–1978, chairman of the University Council in 1985–1988 and chancellor of the university in 1994–1997. He was a member of the board of directors of the European Consortium for Political Research at the European Political Science Association, in 1982–1985, and a member of the board of directors of the Turku University Foundation, in 1989–1997.

In Nousiainen's professorship at the Department of Political Science, he was vigorously taking care of the training of new generation of researchers. Under his guidance as a doctoral student at the University of Turku, Pekka Väänänen (1971), Voitto Helander (1971), Hannu Nurmi (1974), Pertti Laulajainen (1979), Esko Antola (1980), Heikki Paloheimo (1981), Jyrki Käkönen (1985), Matti Wiberg (1988) and Eero Murto (1994). More than half of Nousiainen's doctoral degrees later resided in professorships at various universities.

Nousiainen died on 24 March 2022, at the age of 90.

== Published works ==
- Presidentin valta. Hallitsijanvallan ja parliamentarismin välinen jännite Suomessa 1919–2009. Helsinki: WSOY 2009 (yhdessä Pekka Hallbergin, Tuomo Martikaisen ja Päivi Tiikkaisen kanssa)
- Eduskunnan muuttuva asema. Suomen eduskunta, osa 2. Helsinki: Edita 2006 (Antero Jyrängin kanssa)
- Suomen hallitusmuodon toimivuus: valtiotieteilijän näkökulma. Politiikka 1/1995
- Politiikan huipulla. Porvoo - Helsinki: WSOY 1992.
- Suomen presidentit valtiollisina johtajina: K. J. Ståhlbergistä Mauno Koivistoon. Porvoo-Helsinki-Juva 1985
- Eduskunnan järjestys- ja työmuodot: valiokuntalaitos, suuri valiokunta, täysistunto. Teoksessa Suomen kansanedustuslaitoksen historia. Osa 10. Helsinki 1977.
- Valtioneuvoston järjestysmuoto ja sisäinen toiminta. Valtioneuvoston historia 1917–1966, III. Helsinki 1975, s. 217–390.
- Eduskunta aloitevallan käyttäjänä. Porvoo - Helsinki: WSOY 1961.
- Suomen poliittinen järjestelmä. Porvoo - Helsinki: WSOY 1959, kymmenes uudistettu laitos 1998.
- Puolueet puntarissa. Helsinki: Kirjayhtymä 1959.
- Kommunismi Kuopion läänissä, 1956
