= Physiologia Plantarum =

- Discipline: Experimental plant biology
- Language: English
- Edited by: Ykä (Yrjö) Helariutta

Publication details
- History: 1948–present
- Publisher: Wiley-Blackwell for the Scandinavian Plant Physiology Society
- Frequency: Monthly
- Impact factor: 5.081 (2021)

Standard abbreviations
- ISO 4: Physiol. Plant.

Indexing
- ISSN: 0031-9317 (print); 1399-3054 (web)
- OCLC no.: 301567991

Links
- Journal homepage; Online access; Online archive

Physiologia Plantarum is a peer-reviewed scientific journal published by Wiley-Blackwell on behalf of the Scandinavian Plant Physiology Society. The journal publishes papers on all aspects of all organizational levels of experimental plant biology ranging from biophysics, biochemistry, molecular and cell biology to ecophysiology.

According to the Journal Citation Reports, the journal has a 2021 impact factor of 5.081, ranking it 33rd out of 235 journals in the category "Plant Sciences".
