= University of Turku =

University in Turku, Finland

- Finnish: Turun yliopisto
- Latin: Universitas Aboensis
- Motto: Vapaan kansan lahja vapaalle tieteelle
- Motto in English: The gift of a free people to free science
- Type: Public University
- Established: 1920; 106 years ago
- Affiliations: Coimbra Group, UArctic
- Rector: Marjo Kaartinen
- Administrative staff: 3,412
- Students: 21,900
- Undergraduates: 9,095
- Postgraduates: 6,481
- Doctoral students: 2,033
- Location: Turku, Finland; 60°27′15″N 22°17′5″E
- Campus: Urban
- Website: Official Website (in English)

The University of Turku (Finnish: Turun yliopisto, shortened UTU) is a multidisciplinary public university with eight faculties located in the city of Turku in southwestern Finland. The university also has campuses in Rauma and Pori and research stations in Kevo and Själö.

Established in 1920, the university is the third largest in the country as measured by student enrollment, after the University of Helsinki and Tampere University. It is a member of the Coimbra Group and the European Campus of City-Universities (EC2U).

== History ==
=== Royal Academy of Turku ===
The first university established in Turku was the Royal Academy of Turku, founded on March 26, 1640, by Queen Christina of Sweden at the suggestion of Count Per Brahe. It originated from the Turku Cathedral School, which had been established in 1276. The Royal Academy was the third university in the Swedish Empire and the only one in Finland during the period of Swedish rule.

In 1809, after Russia's victory over Sweden in the Finnish War, Finland was annexed by Russia as the autonomous Grand Duchy of Finland. To reduce Swedish influence and move the capital closer to Saint Petersburg, Finland's capital was relocated from Turku to Helsinki on April 8, 1812. Following the Great Fire of Turku in 1827, the Royal Academy was also transferred to Helsinki, where it eventually became the modern University of Helsinki. For the remainder of the 19th century, Turku did not have a university.

=== University of Turku ===
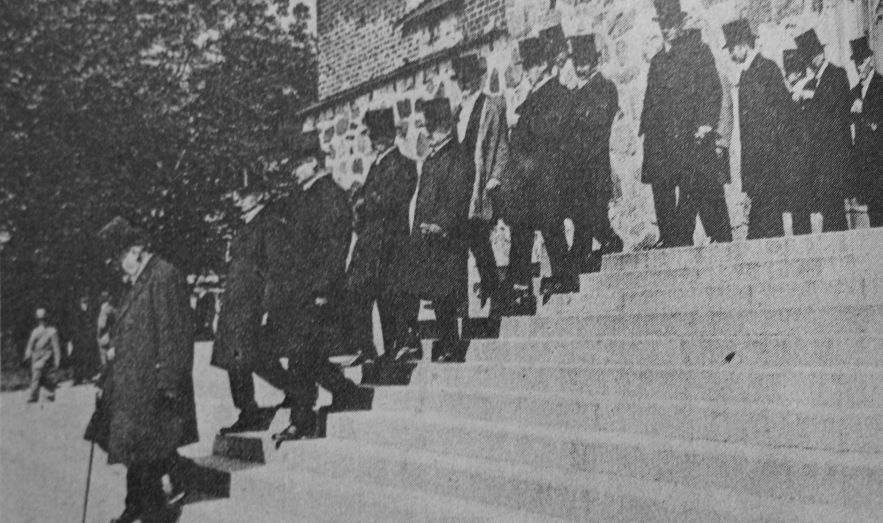
The grand opening of the University of Turku in 1922. On the left is Artturi H. Virkkunen, the first rector of the university

In 1918, university-level teaching returned to Turku with the founding of Åbo Akademi, an exclusively Swedish-speaking institution. This prompted the Finnish intelligentsia to establish a university where Finnish would be the language of instruction—the first of its kind in Finland. As a result, the modern University of Turku was founded on Kalevala Day (February 28) in 1920. A total of 22,040 people contributed to the fundraising campaign. Finland’s newly gained independence and the success of the campaign are reflected in the university's motto: "The gift of a free people to free science."

The first premises of the University of Turku were in the centre of the city, by the market square. In the 1950s a new campus was built on Ryssänmäki (Russian Hill – now known as University Hill). In the 1960s the university started to expand rapidly, a process that still continues.

The university was made a public institution in 1974.

Since 1995 the University of Turku has been a member of the Coimbra Group. In 2017, the university became a member of The European Campus of City-Universities (EC2U).

In January 2010, the Turku School of Economics merged with the University of Turku, forming a seventh faculty of the university.

In 2021, the Faculty of Technology was established as the eighth faculty of the university.

== Enrollment ==
The university has approximately 22,000 degree students. Bachelor's, master's and doctoral degrees are offered both in Finnish and in English. The largest faculties are the Faculty of Humanities and the Faculty of Science and Technology.

The University is a home for The University of Turku Graduate School (UTUGS) which consists of doctoral programmes covering all disciplines. The graduate school has approximately 2,000 doctoral candidates pursuing a PhD.

== Faculties ==
University rankings

Global – Overall
- ARWU World: 401–500 (2024)
- QS World: 366 (2026)
- THE World: 301–350 (2025)
- USNWR Global: =355 (2025)

There are altogether eight faculties in the University of Turku:

- Faculty of Humanities
- Faculty of Education
- Faculty of Medicine
- Faculty of Science
- Faculty of Law
- Faculty of Social Sciences
- Turku School of Economics
- Faculty of Technology

In addition to the faculties, the research and learning activities at the university take place in five independent units: Brahea Centre of the University of Turku, Centre for Language and Communication Studies, Turku PET Centre, Finnish Centre for Astronomy with ESO and Turku Bioscience Centre.

== Organization ==
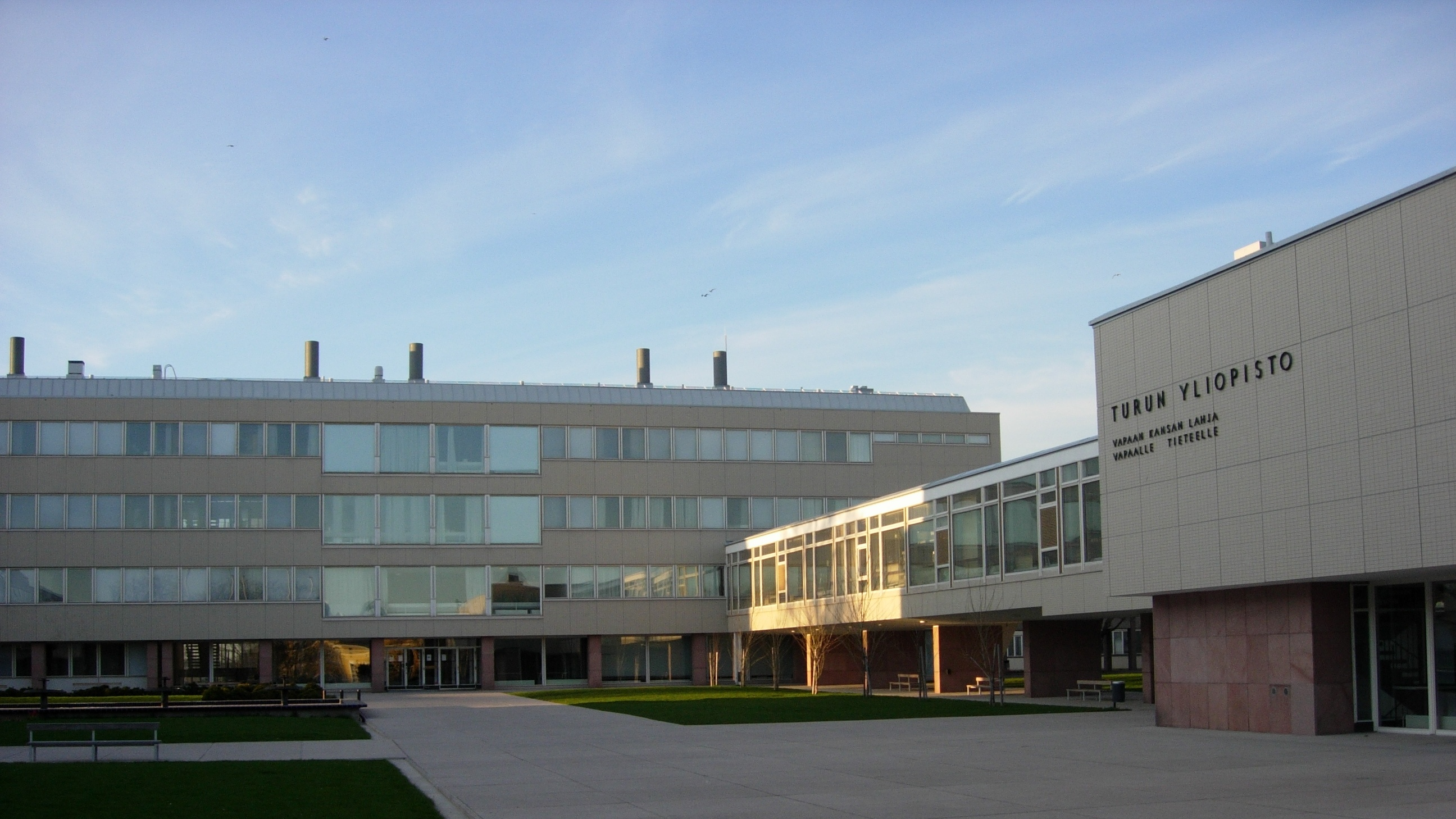
Natura (left) and Main Building (right)

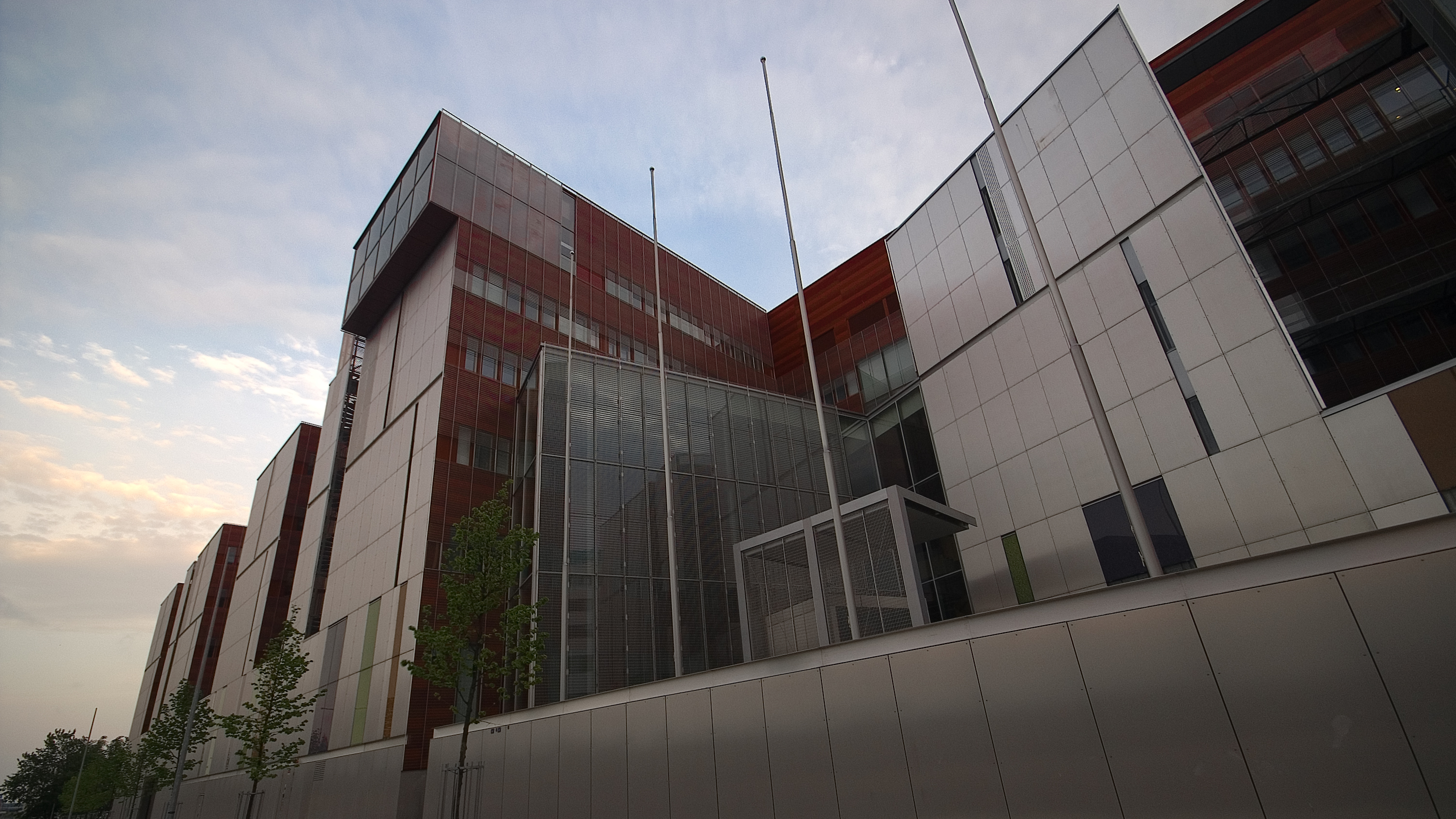
ICT Building

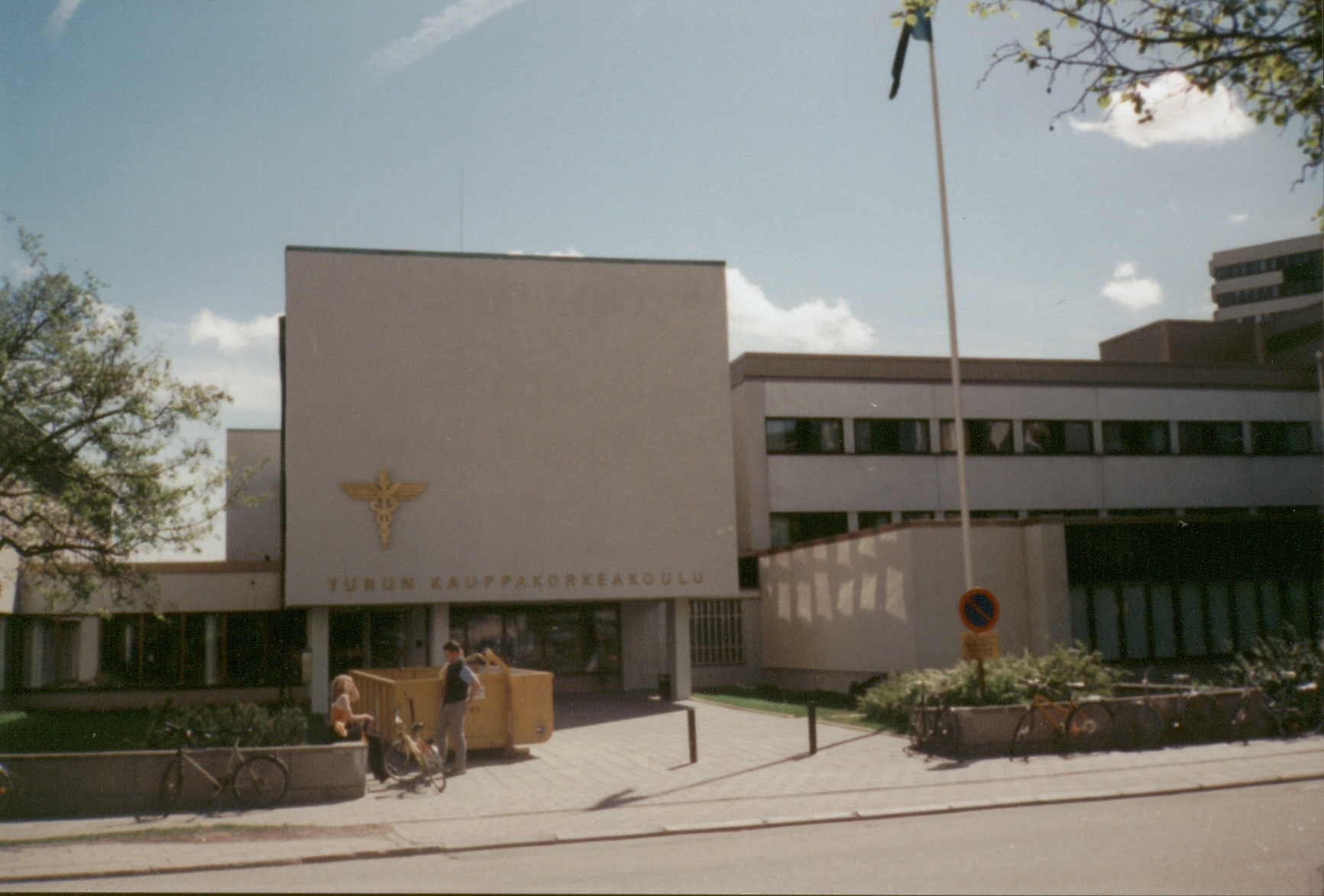
Turku School of Economics

The university management consists of the Board, The Rector and the vice rectors and the University Collegiate Council.

The Board is the highest decision-making organ of the university and is made up of 10 members from academia, society and studentship.Organisation and Management of the University of Turku | University of Turku It develops the university's operating processes and approves plans concerning its financing and activities; it decide on the guidelines of granting appropriations; it give its opinion in any matters of significance that concern the university in principle and the Board approves the service regulations and other similar rules.

The Rector directs the activities and processes of the university and solves any issues concerning its general management. The Rector represents the university and uses the university's right to speak in courts of law and in dealings with the authorities. Professor Marjo Kaartinen is currently the elected Rector.

The University Collegiate Council consists of 30 members: ten professors, ten other teaching and research personnel and other staff and ten students.

== Campus area ==
The University of Turku shares a campus with Åbo Akademi University and elements of Turku Science Park. The area also encompasses Turku University Hospital (TYKS) and the Student Village. The Main Building and the surrounding complex was built in the fifties on what became known as the University Hill. The campus is constantly expanding, the latest example is the Medisiina D building which houses the facilities of the Faculty of Medicine. The university also owns the Botanic Garden at Ruissalo as well as the research station at the Island of Seili. In addition to the campus area in Turku, the university also has campus areas in the nearby cities of Pori and Rauma.

== Research ==
As defined in its strategy 2030, the university's multidisciplinary research is profiled through six thematic areas which are biodiversity and sustainability; future technologies and digital society; cultural memory and social change; children, young people and learning; health, diagnostics and drug development; and sea and maritime studies.

The University of Turku has been involved in many research projects in the Peruvian Amazon. With the Peruvian Amazon Research Institute (Instituto de Investigaciones de la Amazonía Peruana – IIAP), based in Iquitos, has been studying the Amazon in the BIODAMAZ Project.

The university is an active member of the University of the Arctic. UArctic is an international cooperative network based in the Circumpolar Arctic region, consisting of more than 200 universities, colleges, and other organizations with an interest in promoting education and research in the Arctic region.

The university participates in UArctic's mobility program north2north. The aim of that program is to enable students of member institutions to study in different parts of the North.

== Notable alumni ==
- Timo Airaksinen – Professor of Moral Philosophy
- Matti Anttonen – diplomat and Secretary of State
- Liisa Hyssälä – Member of Parliament, Minister of Health and Social Services
- Krista Kiuru – Member of Parliament, Minister of Family Affairs and Social Services
- Mauno Koivisto – 9th President of Finland
- Martti Koskenniemi – Professor of International Law
- Heli Laaksonen – poet
- Paula Lehtomäki – Member of Parliament, Minister for Foreign Trade and Development
- Kaisa Matomäki – mathematician and SASTRA Ramanujan Prize winner
- Sauli Niinistö – 12th President of Finland
- Ville Niinistö – Member of the European Parliament
- Petteri Orpo – Prime Minister of Finland
- Riikka Purra – Member of Parliament, Minister of Finance, Deputy Prime Minister of Finland
- Pekka Puska – Member of Parliament, physician
- Annika Saarikko – Member of Parliament, former Minister of Finance, former Deputy Prime Minister of Finland
- Jarmo Viinanen – diplomat, Secretary General of the Presidential Office

== Rectors ==
- Artturi H. Virkkunen (1922–1924)
- V. A. Koskenniemi (1924–1932)
- J. G. Granö (1932–1934)
- Einar W. Juva (1934–1945)
- Harry Waris (1945–1948)
- T. E. Olin (1948–1954)
- Osmo Järvi (1954–1960)
- Tauno Nurmela (1960–1970)
- Kaarlo Hartiala (1970–1975)
- Osmo Ikola (1975–1981)
- Arje Scheinin (1981–1987)
- Arne Rousi (1987–1993)
- Keijo Paunio (1994–1997)
- Keijo Virtanen (1997–2012)
- Kalervo Väänänen (2012–2019)
- Jukka Kola (2019–2024)
- Marjo Kaartinen (2024–)

== Chancellors ==
The Chancellor, appointed by the President of Finland upon proposal of the Finnish Government, was to promote science and scholarship, look after the general interests of the university and supervise its activities. The Chancellor confirmed the standing orders and other corresponding general regulations of the university. The most visible task of the Chancellor was the appointment of the Professors and the Docents of the university. Professor Pekka Puska was the last person to hold this position until it was abolished based on the decision of the University Board. The duties were reassigned to the Rector.

- Johan Richard Danielson-Kalmari (1921–1926)
- Emil Nestor Setälä (1926–1935)
- Gustaf Komppa (1935–1945)
- Johannes Gabriel Granö (1945–1955)
- T. E. Olin (1955–1965)
- Rolf Nevanlinna (1965–1970)
- Tauno Nurmela (1970–1975)
- Kaarlo Hartiala (1975–1984)
- Olavi Granö (1984–1994)
- Jaakko Nousiainen (1994–1997)
- Keijo Paunio (1997–2000)
- Sirkka Kartio (2000–2003)
- Eero Vuorio (2003–2009)
- Pekka Puska (2010–2013)

== See also ==
- List of modern universities in Europe (1801–1945)
