= Scandinavian Plant Physiology Society =

Botanical society

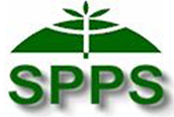
- Founded: 1947
- Location: University of Helsinki, Finland
- Origins: Founded as Societas Physiologia Plantarum Scandinavica
- Key people: President: Jaakko Kangasjärvi; Vice-President: Tom Hamborg Nielsen; Treasurer: Kurt Fagerstedt; Secretary General: Anna Kärkönen; Secretary: Niina Idänheimo
- Website: www.spps.fi

The Scandinavian Plant Physiology Society (SPPS) is a professional society working to promote all aspects of experimental plant biology, from molecular cell biology and biochemistry to ecophysiology. SPPS is a forum for contact and communication among plant biologist.

SPPS is an international society based in the Scandinavian countries and headed by an elected board with representatives from Denmark, Finland, Sweden and Norway. Presently the SPPS office is placed in Helsinki.

SPPS is open to anybody with interest in plant biology. Presently the society counts around 250 members of which about half come from the USA, Japan, Germany, and other non-Scandinavian countries.

SPPS is affiliated to the Federation of European Societies for Plant Biology (FESPB) and the European Plant Science Organisation (EPSO). From 2008 to 2010, the former president of SPPS, Jan K. Schjørring, also served as president for FESPB.

== Publications ==
SPPS publishes a monthly peer-reviewed journal:

- Physiologia Plantarum since 1948

Physiologia Plantarum has an impact factor of 2.708 and ranks #28 among the 172 most cited international plant science journals. The journal is published on behalf of SPPS by Wiley-Blackwell.

The society also publishes the quarterly SPPS Newsletter, which is distributed to all SPPS members.

== Conferences ==
SPPS organises two biannual meetings: the SPPS Congress and the SPPS PhD Student Conference. The most recent meetings are listed below.

- 2014: 8th SPPS PhD Student Conference, Uppsala, Sweden
- 2011: XXIV SPPS Congress, Stavanger, Norway
- 2010: 6th SPPS PhD Student Conference, Espoo, Finland
- 2008: XVI FESPB Congress (hosted and arranged by SPPS as XXIII SPPS Congress), Tampere, Finland
- 2008: 5th SPPS PhD Student Conference, Haslev, Denmark
- 2006: 4th SPPS PhD Student Conference, Lycksele, Sweden
- 2005: XXII SPPS Congress, Umeå, Sweden
- 2004: XXII SPPS Congress, Asker, Norway

Since SPPS was holding presidency of FESPB from 2008 to 2010, the planned SPPS Congresses in 2007 and 2009 were substituted for the 2008 FESPB Congress that SPPS was obliged to host and arrange.

== Grants ==
SPPS provides financial support for a range of meetings and other initiatives. The Society supports international symposia and workshops in plant physiology and related topics, organised by SPPS members in the Nordic countries. Travel grants can be granted to students and PhD students participating in conferences arranged by SPPS or others, and to Scandinavian scientists visiting another Scandinavian laboratory.

== Other activities ==
SPPS assists Scandinavian universities in arranging summer schools and participates in the international initiative Global Plant Council.

== History ==
SPPS shares its history with Physiologia Plantarum. During the end of the 1940s Nordic plant physiologists faced difficulties in getting their work published in international journals. Professor M. G. Stålfelt from Stockholms Högskola realized that the plant science community in Scandinavia needed their own organization and journal, so he arranged a meeting in Copenhagen 27–28 October 1947 with representatives from Denmark, Finland, Norway and Sweden.

It was decided to establish the organization Societas Physiologia Plantarum Scandinavica and that it should arrange regular scientific conferences and publish the journal Physiologia Plantarum from 1948. Professor Hans G. Burström from Lund was appointed editor-in-chief of the journal, a position that he administered for 22 years.
