= Parbhani Assembly constituency =

Constituency of the Maharashtra legislative assembly in India

Coordinates: 19.26°N 76.78°E

Parbhani
- Constituency No. 96 for the Maharashtra Legislative Assembly

Constituency details
- Country: India
- Region: Western India
- State: Maharashtra
- District: Parbhani
- Established: 1952
- Total electors: 350,721
- Reservation: None

Member of Legislative Assembly
- 15th Maharashtra Legislative Assembly
- Incumbent Rahul Vedprakash Patil
- Party: SS(UBT)
- Alliance: MVA
- Elected year: 2024

Parbhani Assembly constituency is one of 288 assembly constituencies of Maharashtra state of India. It comes under Parbhani Lok Sabha constituency for Indian general elections.

The current member of legislative assembly (MLA) from this constituency is Rahul Vedprakash Patil of Shiv Sena who defeated Mohammad Gouse Zain of Vanchit Bahujan Aghadi by 81,790 votes.

In the 2014 Assembly elections, Rahul Patil replaced two-time MLA Sanjay Haribhau Jadhav of his own party who went on to become the member of parliament from Parbhani Lok Sabha constituency.

== Members of the Legislative Assembly ==
Election	Member	Party
1952	Annasaheb Gavane	Peasants and Workers Party of India
1957	Annasaheb Gavane	Peasants and Workers Party of India
1962	Sheshrao Deshmukh	Peasants and Workers Party of India
1967	Annasaheb Gavane	Peasants and Workers Party of India
1972	Raosaheb Jamkar	Indian National Congress
1978	Raosaheb Jamkar	Indian National Congress
1980	Abdul Rahman Khan Yousuf Khan	Indian National Congress (I)
1985	Vijay Annasaheb Gavane	Peasants and Workers Party of India
1990	Hanumantrao Bobde	Shiv Sena
1995	Tukaram Renge Patil	Shiv Sena
1999	Tukaram Renge Patil	Shiv Sena
2004	Sanjay Haribhau Jadhav	Shiv Sena
2009	Sanjay Haribhau Jadhav	Shiv Sena
2014	Dr. Rahul Vedprakash Patil	Shiv Sena
2019	Dr. Rahul Vedprakash Patil	Shiv Sena
2024	Dr. Rahul Vedprakash Patil	Shiv Sena (UBT)

== Election results ==
=== Assembly Election 2024 ===
2024 Maharashtra Legislative Assembly election : Parbhani
Party	Candidate	Votes	%	±%
SS(UBT)	Dr. Rahul Vedprakash Patil	126,803	54.56%	New
SS	Anand Sheshrao Bharose	92,587	39.84%	▼15.01
Independent	Naser Sharif Shaikh	5,442	2.34%	New
RSPS	Chakor Mahamuni Savitri	1,779	0.77%	New
Independent	Mohammed Gouse Zain	1,773	0.76%	New
NOTA	None of the above	1,355	0.58%	▼0.25
Margin of victory		34,216	14.72%	▼28.18
Turnout		233,781	66.66%	▲3.83
Total valid votes		232,426		
Registered electors		350,721		▲14.44
SS(UBT) gain from SS		Swing	▼0.29	

=== Assembly Election 2019 ===
2019 Maharashtra Legislative Assembly election : Parbhani
Party	Candidate	Votes	%	±%
SS	Dr. Rahul Vedprakash Patil	104,584	54.85%	▲17.02
VBA	Mohammed Gouse Zain	22,794	11.95%	New
AIMIM	Ali Khan Moin Khan	22,741	11.93%	▼11.88
Independent	Suresh Kundlikrao Nagre	18,431	9.67%	New
INC	Raviraj Ashokrao Deshmukh	15,580	8.17%	▲4.29
MNS	Sachin Bhimrao Patil	1,917	1.01%	New
NOTA	None of the above	1,586	0.83%	▲0.27
Margin of victory		81,790	42.90%	▲28.88
Turnout		192,549	62.83%	▼5.57
Total valid votes		190,674		
Registered electors		306,460		▲10.09
SS hold		Swing	▲17.02	

=== Assembly Election 2014 ===
2014 Maharashtra Legislative Assembly election : Parbhani
Party	Candidate	Votes	%	±%
SS	Dr. Rahul Vedprakash Patil	71,584	37.83%	▼2.76
AIMIM	Syed Khaled	45,058	23.81%	New
BJP	Anand Bharose	42,051	22.22%	New
NCP	Pratap Deshmukh	11,375	6.01%	New
INC	Irfan ur Rahman Khan	7,342	3.88%	▼15.01
BSP	Kadam Dattarya Shrirangrao	3,486	1.84%	▼5.94
NOTA	None of the above	1,053	0.56%	New
Margin of victory		26,526	14.02%	▲1.40
Turnout		190,423	68.40%	▲7.77
Total valid votes		189,214		
Registered electors		278,377		▲3.73
SS hold		Swing	▼2.76	

=== Assembly Election 2009 ===
2009 Maharashtra Legislative Assembly election : Parbhani
Party	Candidate	Votes	%	±%
SS	Sanjay Haribhau Jadhav	66,021	40.59%	▼6.61
Independent	Vikhar Ahmed Khan	45,498	27.97%	New
INC	Tukaram Renge Patil	30,726	18.89%	▼22.17
BSP	Bhimrao Nagorao Hatiambire	12,651	7.78%	▲2.60
CPI(M)	Madhuri Rajan Kshirsagar	2,054	1.26%	New
MNS	Deshmukh Sunil	1,841	1.13%	New
Independent	Mo. Shaji Ahemad Khan	1,660	1.02%	New
Margin of victory		20,523	12.62%	▲6.48
Turnout		162,697	60.63%	▼0.94
Total valid votes		162,647		
Registered electors		268,357		▲4.06
SS hold		Swing	▼6.61	

=== Assembly Election 2004 ===
2004 Maharashtra Legislative Assembly election : Parbhani
Party	Candidate	Votes	%	±%
SS	Sanjay Haribhau Jadhav	74,939	47.20%	▲5.06
INC	Ashok Anandrao Deshmukh	65,192	41.06%	▲4.19
BSP	Dhembre Baburao Khobraji	8,231	5.18%	▲3.88
Independent	Yahya Khan M. Ishaqe	1,866	1.18%	New
Bahujan Mahasangha Paksha	Dr. Mawalge Mohan Yadavrao	1,751	1.10%	New
SP	A. Rauf Lala	1,728	1.09%	New
BBM	Parvez Hashmi Mahemood Hashmi	970	0.61%	New
Margin of victory		9,747	6.14%	▲0.87
Turnout		158,786	61.57%	▲3.81
Total valid votes		158,783		
Registered electors		257,888		▲3.69
SS hold		Swing	▲5.06	

=== Assembly Election 1999 ===
1999 Maharashtra Legislative Assembly election : Parbhani
Party	Candidate	Votes	%	±%
SS	Tukaram Renge Patil	58,257	42.14%	▲4.51
INC	Ansari Liaquat Ali	50,978	36.87%	▲11.97
NCP	Vijay Annasaheb Gavane	26,106	18.88%	New
BSP	Khandare Devrao Ganpatrao	1,802	1.30%	New
Margin of victory		7,279	5.27%	▼7.46
Turnout		143,668	57.76%	▼8.99
Total valid votes		138,249		
Registered electors		248,718		▲6.59
SS hold		Swing	▲4.51	

=== Assembly Election 1995 ===
1995 Maharashtra Legislative Assembly election : Parbhani
Party	Candidate	Votes	%	±%
SS	Tukaram Renge Patil	57,212	37.63%	▼4.41
INC	Shamim Ahmed Khan	37,858	24.90%	▼7.32
JD	Ganeshrao Raut Dudhgaonkar	16,900	11.12%	▼13.00
BBM	Hake Suryakant Mukundrao	16,284	10.71%	New
Independent	Ambure Devichand Digambarrao	4,340	2.85%	New
Independent	Bharose Sheshrao Dhondaji	3,695	2.43%	New
PWPI	Dudhate Laxmanrao Madhavrao	2,796	1.84%	New
Independent	Chopde Rangnathrao Gyanbarao	1,961	1.29%	New
Margin of victory		19,354	12.73%	▲2.91
Turnout		155,752	66.75%	▲9.06
Total valid votes		152,045		
Registered electors		233,342		▲12.31
SS hold		Swing	▼4.41	

=== Assembly Election 1990 ===
1990 Maharashtra Legislative Assembly election : Parbhani
Party	Candidate	Votes	%	±%
SS	Hanumantrao Bobde	49,534	42.04%	New
INC	Shamim Ahmed Khan	37,966	32.22%	▲0.35
JD	Vijay Annasaheb Gavane	28,422	24.12%	New
Margin of victory		11,568	9.82%	▲4.13
Turnout		119,860	57.69%	▲5.88
Total valid votes		117,821		
Registered electors		207,764		▲50.32
SS gain from PWPI		Swing	▲4.48	

=== Assembly Election 1985 ===
1985 Maharashtra Legislative Assembly election : Parbhani
Party	Candidate	Votes	%	±%
PWPI	Vijay Annasaheb Gavane	26,335	37.56%	▲8.87
INC	Ayesha Begum Iqbal Hussain	22,346	31.87%	New
Independent	Taqi Hassan khan	12,551	17.90%	New
Independent	Ubale Kishanrao Thamajirao	4,311	6.15%	New
CPI	Ghodke Sitalnath Jagannath	1,101	1.57%	New
Independent	Pathan Sarfarjkhan Lalkhan	1,042	1.49%	New
Independent	Hashami Sarwat Parwij	705	1.01%	New
Margin of victory		3,989	5.69%	▼10.83
Turnout		71,605	51.81%	▲4.46
Total valid votes		70,109		
Registered electors		138,211		▲20.79
PWPI gain from INC(I)		Swing	▼7.66	

=== Assembly Election 1980 ===
1980 Maharashtra Legislative Assembly election : Parbhani
Party	Candidate	Votes	%	±%
INC(I)	Abdul Rahman Khan Yousuf Khan	23,910	45.22%	▲25.98
PWPI	Vijay Annasaheb Gavane	15,172	28.69%	▼9.44
INC(U)	Ramchandra Deshmukh	8,824	16.69%	New
BJP	Chidrawar Sudhakar Bhimshankar	3,339	6.31%	New
Independent	Kale Piraji Govindrao	1,633	3.09%	New
Margin of victory		8,738	16.52%	▲13.16
Turnout		54,176	47.35%	▼14.40
Total valid votes		52,878		
Registered electors		114,422		▲10.25
INC(I) gain from INC		Swing	▲3.72	

=== Assembly Election 1978 ===
1978 Maharashtra Legislative Assembly election : Parbhani
Party	Candidate	Votes	%	±%
INC	Raosaheb Jamkar	25,700	41.50%	▼9.79
PWPI	Annasaheb Gavane	23,616	38.13%	▲0.43
INC(I)	Iqbal Ahmed Hussain	11,919	19.24%	New
Independent	Shakuntalbai Khande	392	0.63%	New
Margin of victory		2,084	3.36%	▼10.23
Turnout		64,084	61.75%	▲7.38
Total valid votes		61,935		
Registered electors		103,782		▲5.80
INC hold		Swing	▼9.79	

=== Assembly Election 1972 ===
1972 Maharashtra Legislative Assembly election : Parbhani
Party	Candidate	Votes	%	±%
INC	Raosaheb Jamkar	26,293	51.29%	▲11.55
PWPI	Annasaheb Gavane	19,328	37.70%	▼5.17
ABJS	Govindrao Gavane	2,314	4.51%	▼1.44
Independent	Haji Syed Ali	1,840	3.59%	New
RPI	Watode Sambhaji Namji	1,487	2.90%	New
Margin of victory		6,965	13.59%	▲10.46
Turnout		53,333	54.37%	▲0.74
Total valid votes		51,262		
Registered electors		98,093		▲18.83
INC gain from PWPI		Swing	▲8.42	

=== Assembly Election 1967 ===
1967 Maharashtra Legislative Assembly election : Parbhani
Party	Candidate	Votes	%	±%
PWPI	Annasaheb Gavane	17,873	42.87%	▼8.41
INC	Madhavrao Kadam	16,568	39.74%	▲0.48
Independent	J. G. Khare	3,293	7.90%	New
ABJS	M. M. Khating	2,479	5.95%	New
Independent	J. P. Yengde	781	1.87%	New
Independent	Gulam Mustafa Khan	701	1.68%	New
Margin of victory		1,305	3.13%	▼8.89
Turnout		44,274	53.63%	▲3.97
Total valid votes		41,695		
Registered electors		82,547		▲15.05
PWPI hold		Swing	▼8.41	

=== Assembly Election 1962 ===
1962 Maharashtra Legislative Assembly election : Parbhani
Party	Candidate	Votes	%	±%
PWPI	Sheshrao Deshmukh	17,215	51.28%	▼9.46
INC	Ambadasrao Warpudkar	13,179	39.26%	
Independent	Rambhau Gangaram	2,849	8.49%	New
Independent	Shanker Munjajee	327	0.97%	New
Margin of victory		4,036	12.02%	▼9.46
Turnout		35,631	49.66%	▲17.41
Total valid votes		33,570		
Registered electors		71,746		▲11.13
PWPI hold		Swing	▼9.46	

=== Assembly Election 1957 ===
1957 Bombay State Legislative Assembly election : Parbhani
Party	Candidate	Votes	%	±%
PWPI	Annasaheb Gavane	12,647	60.74%	▼14.76
INC	Rangrao Deshmukh	8,175	39.26%	▲20.80
Margin of victory		4,472	21.48%	▼35.56
Turnout		20,822	32.25%	▼13.69
Total valid votes		20,822		
Registered electors		64,562		▲11.85
PWPI hold		Swing	▼14.76	

=== Assembly Election 1952 ===
1952 Hyderabad State Legislative Assembly election : Parbhani
Party	Candidate	Votes	%	±%
PWPI	Annasaheb Gavane	20,020	75.50%	New
INC	Mukundrao Padgaonkar	4,895	18.46%	New
Socialist	Jageshwar Dayal	1,603	6.04%	New
Margin of victory		15,125	57.04%	
Turnout		26,518	45.94%	
Total valid votes		26,518		
Registered electors		57,723		
PWPI win (new seat)				

== Villages in Constituency ==
List of villages in the constituency

- Alapur Pandri
- Asola
- Babli
- Balsa
- Bramapuri
- Bramhangaon
- Devthana
- Dhangarwadi
- Dhar
- Dharangaon
- Dharmapuri
- Durdi
- Gurwa
- Jalalpur
- Jamb
- Jodparli
- Karadgaon
- Karegaon
- Kaudgaon
- Mandwa
- Mangangaon
- Matkharala
- Mirkhel
- Mirzapur
- Murumba
- Nandapur
- Nandkheda
- Nandgaon
- Parva
- Pathra
- Pedgaon
- Pimpalgaon Tond
- Pimpla
- Pimpri Deshmukh
- Pingali
- Pingli Ko
- Porjawla
- Rahati
- Raipur
- Saba
- Sadegaon
- Sambar
- Samsapur
- Sanpuri
- Satla
- Sawangi
- Sendra
- Shahapur
- Singla
- Sukapurwadi
- Sultanpur
- Tadborgaon
- Tadlimba
- Takli Bobade
- Takli Kumbhakarna
- Tatujawla
- Ukhalad
- Varpud
- Wadadimai
- Wangi
- Zari

== See also ==
- List of constituencies of the Maharashtra Legislative Assembly
- Parbhani district
