= List of educational institutions in Parbhani district =

Due to the increase in population in last two decades, Parbhani district is going through rapid progression in the fields of education. Aided with the Parbhani Agriculture University, located in Parbhani city, the district is witnessing positive changes in academics. Colleges such as Government Veterinary College, and research centres related to agriculture from the university are creating Parbhani's image as an upcoming educational hub.

Parbhani district is divided into nine administrative sub-units (tehsils), namely, Parbhani, Gangakhed, Sonpeth, Pathri, Manwath, Palam, Selu, Jintur, and Purna.

== Parbhani city ==
=== Agricultural University ===
The first college of Agriculture was established in this region at Parbhani in 1956 by Hyderabad State Government just before the Maharashtra State reorganisation. The current day Vasantrao Naik Marathwada Agricultural University (VNMAU) was established on 18 May 1972 as Marathwada Agriculture University to fulfil the regional aspirations of agrarian growth, with further responsibilities to provide education in agriculture and allied fields, and to undertake research and facilitate technology transfer in Marathwada region. It is one of the only four Agricultural Universities in the State of Maharashtra.

Since 1970s, Parbhani has proved itself as the hub of educational, research, and extension activities. The famous 'Gaorani' cotton, a breed of Indian cotton, is the result of research facilities at Parbhani. The university was renamed after the name of former Chief Minister of Maharashta, Vasantrao Naik, in 2013.

College of Veterinary and Animal Sciences is located on the campus of VNMAU which is one of the constituent Veterinary Colleges coming under the authority of Maharashtra Animal and Fishery Sciences University, Nagpur from 2000. Earlier this college was established in 1972 as a part of Marathwada Agriculture University.

=== Colleges ===
- Vasantrao Naik Marathwada Agricultural University
- Government College of Veterinary & Animal Sciences (situated within the campus of MAU, but governed by MAFSU)
- P.D. Jain Homoeopathic Medical College
- Saraswati Dhanwantari Dental College
- Rajiv Gandhi College of Agriculture, and Food Technology
- Shree Shivaji College of Engineering and Management
- Sitaramji Mundada Marathwada Polytechnic College
- Shri Shivaji Law College
- Shree Shivaji College of Arts, Commerce, and Science
- Dnyanopasak College of Arts, Commerce, Science, and Technology
- Sant Tukaram College of Arts, Commerce, Science
- Beleshwar Institute of Nursing
- Yeshwant College of Information Technology, Bioinformatics and Biotechnology
- M.G.M. College of CS & IT
- Beleshwar College of BCA & MCMM
- Dr. Zakir Hussain Women's Degree College
- Queens College of Education
- District Institute of Education and Training

=== Junior colleges ===
- Bal Vidya Mandir High School and Jr. College
- Shree Shivaji Junior College of Arts, Commerce, Science, and Vocational Science
- Dr. Zakir Hussain Jr. College of Arts, commerce, Science and MSVC
- Haji Mohammad Padela Jr. College of Science
- Queens Jr. College of Science
- Sant Tukaram Jr. College
- Vishwashanti Dnyanpeeth Junior College

=== Schools ===
* Maulana Abul Kalam Azad Urdu High School Parbhani

- Indian School of Learning and Integration
- Bal Vidya Mandir High School, and Junior College
- Marathwada High School
- Dr. Zakir Hussain Urdu Primary and High Schools
- National Urdu High School
- Faran Urdu High School
- Kamel Urdu High School
- Moidul Muslimeen Urdu High School
- Orchid English School
- Manar International School
- Podar international school
- Scottish Academy School
- St. Augustine School
- Gandhi Vidhyalaya High School
- Global English School
- Arbindo Aksharjyoti School

== Jintur town ==
- Government Polytechnic Institute
- Government Industrial Training Institute (ITI)
- Dyneshwar Vidyalay
- New Era English School
- Jawahar Vidyalay
- Eklavya Balvidya Mandir (primary & secondary)
- Dr. Zakir Hussain Urdu Primary and High School
- DSM College, Jintur
- Vilasrao Deshmukh Urdu High School and Junior College
- Ihyaul Uloom madrasa
- SPARTAN Institute of Education and Research
- Krantisinh Nana Patil Vastigruh Shivaji Nagar Jintur
