= Kausadi, Jintur =

Village in Maharashtra

Kausadi
- Village
- Location in Maharashtra, India Kausadi (India)
- Coordinates: 19°28′23″N 76°41′25″E
- Country: India
- State: Maharashtra
- District: Parbhani

Government
  - Type: Gram panchayat

Population (2011)
  - Total: 7,457
- Demonym: Kausadikar

Languages
  - Official: Marathi
- Time zone: UTC+5:30 (IST)
- PIN: 431508
- Telephone code: 02457
- Vehicle registration: MH-22

Kausadi is a village in Jintur taluka of Parbhani district in Maharashtra state of India.

== Demography ==
Kausadi has a total of 1,529 families resident. The village has a population of 7,457 of which 3,764 are males while 3,693 are females as per Population Census 2011.

== Transport ==
Kausadi is located 29 km (18 mi) north of the district centre Parbhani, 18 km (11 mi) from Jintur and 474 km (295 mi) from the State capital Mumbai. Parbhani, Sailu, Manwath and Pathri are the nearest cities to Kausadi.

Kausadi has no railway station; the nearest stations include those of Parbhani 18 km (11 mi) away, and Manwath road 22 km (14 mi) away.

== Government and politics ==
Kausadi comes under Parbhani (Lok Sabha constituency) for Indian general elections. The current member of Parliament representing this constituency is Sanjay Haribhau Jadhav of Shiv Sena.

Kausadi comes under Jintur (Vidhan Sabha constituency) for assembly elections of Maharashtra. The current representative from this constituency in Maharashtra state assembly is Meghana Bordikar of Bhartiya Janta Party.
