= Manwath Road =

Village in Maharashtra

Manwath Road New Manwath
- Village/Railway station
- Location in Maharashtra, India Manwath Road (India)
- Coordinates: 19°21′30″N 76°32′06″E
- Country: India
- State: Maharashtra
- District: Parbhani

Government
  - Type: Gram panchayat
- Elevation: 421 m (1,381 ft)

Population (2011)
  - Total: 760
- Demonym: Manwathkar

Languages
  - Official: Marathi
- Time zone: UTC+5:30 (IST)
- PIN: 431505
- Telephone code: 02451
- ISO 3166 code: IN-MH
- Vehicle registration: MH-22
- Website: maharashtra.gov.in

Manwath Road is a village in Manwath taluka of Parbhani district of Indian state of Maharashtra. Village is mainly known for being a major railway station on Nanded-Aurangabad rail route. Station code of Manwath road is MVO. It is 8 km away from taluka headquarter Manwath.

== Demography ==
- As per 2011 census, Manwath road has total 198 families residing. Village has population of 760 of which 385 were males while 375 were females.
- Average Sex Ratio of village is 974 which is higher than Maharashtra state average of 929.
- Literacy rate of village was 84.19% compared to 82.95% of Maharashtra. Male literacy rate was 93.5% while female literacy rate was 74.3%.
- Schedule Caste (SC) constitutes 28.5% while Schedule Tribe (ST) were 8% of total population.

== Manwath Road Railway Station ==
Parameter	Detail
Station code	MVO
Zone	SCR (South Central)
Division	Hazur Sahib Nanded
District	Parbhani
Platforms	2
Halting Trains	41
Track	Electrified

== Other Transport ==
Manwath Road is situated on National Highway 222 and well connected to surrounding cities. Following table shows distance of some cities from Manwath Road.

City	Distance(KM)
Manwath	8
Pathri	18
Parbhani	30
Sailu	15
Nanded	93
Jalna	98
Aurangabad	148

== See also ==
- List of railway stations in India
