= Walur =

Village in Maharashtra

Walur Balur
- Village
- Nickname: Walour or Balor
- Location in Maharashtra, India Walur (India)
- Coordinates: 19°29′14″N 76°33′22″E
- Country: India
- State: Maharashtra
- District: Parbhani

Government
  - Type: Gram panchayat

Population (2011)
  - Total: 15,008 +
- Demonym: Walurkar

Languages
  - Official: Marathi

Regional
  - Languages: Hindi
- Time zone: UTC+5:30 (IST)
- PIN: 431503
- Telephone code: 02451
- Vehicle registration: MH-22

Walur also known as Balur is a major village in Sailu Or (Selu <local name of the same Taluka> )taluka of Parbhani district in Maharashtra state of India.

== Demography ==
Walur is a village with total 2100 families residing. The Walour village has population of 15008+ of which 5652 are males while 5356 are females as per Population Census 2011.

Average Sex Ratio of Walur village is 948 which is higher than Maharashtra state average of 929.

Walur village has lower literacy rate compared to Maharashtra. In 2011, literacy rate of Walour village was 66.93% compared to 82.34% of Maharashtra. In Walour Male literacy stands at 75.82% while female literacy rate was 57.67%.

Schedule Caste (SC) constitutes 8.82% while Schedule Tribe (ST) were 1.49% of total population in Walour village.

== Transport ==
It is located 39 km (24 mi) towards north from district headquarters Parbhani. 14 km (8.7 mi) from Sailu. 458 km (285 mi) from State capital Mumbai.

== Government and politics ==
Walur comes under Parbhani (Lok Sabha constituency) for Indian general elections and current member of Parliament representing this constituency is Sanjay Haribhau Jadhav of Shiv Sena.

Walur comes under Jintur (Vidhan Sabha constituency) for assembly elections of Maharashtra. Current representative from this constituency in Maharashtra state assembly is meghna bordikar sakore of bhartiy janta Party.
