= Parva, Parbhani =

Village in Maharashtra

Parva
- Village
- Location in Maharashtra, India 19°27'61"N 76°71'63"E Parva (India)
- Coordinates: 19.276191°N 76.716378°E
- Country: India
- State: Maharashtra
- District: Parbhani

Government
  - Type: Gram panchayat

Population (2011)
  - Total: 2,218
- Demonym: Parvakar

Languages
  - Official: Marathi
- Time zone: UTC+5:30 (IST)
- PIN: 431401
- Telephone code: 02452
- ISO 3166 code: IN-MH
- Vehicle registration: MH-22

Parva also known as Parawa is a village in Parbhani taluka of Parbhani district of Maharashtra state in India.

== Demography ==
According to the 2011 census of India, Parva had a population of 2218, of which 1135 were male and 1084 were female. The average sex ratio of the village was 956, which was higher than the Maharashtra state average of 929. The literacy rate was 62.34% compared to 82.3% for the state. Male literacy rate was 74% while female literacy rate was 59%.

== Geography and Transport ==
Following table shows distance of Parva from some of major cities.

City	Distance (km)
Parbhani	07
Manwath	30
Sailu	40
Nanded	77
Aurangabad	188
Mumbai	502
