= Tadborgaon =

Village in Maharashtra

- Village/Railway station
- Location in Maharashtra Tadborgaon (India)
- Coordinates: 19.3322531°N 76.5992573°E
- Country: India
- State: Maharashtra
- District: Parbhani
- Taluka: Manwath

Government
  - Type: Gram panchayat
- Elevation: 420 m (1,380 ft)

Population (2011)
  - Total: 2,928
- Demonym: Tadborgaonkar

Languages
  - Official: Marathi
- Time zone: UTC+5:30 (IST)
- PIN: 431537
- Telephone code: 02452
- ISO 3166 code: IN-MH
- Vehicle registration: MH-22
- Website: maharashtra.gov.in

Tadborgaon is a village in Manwath taluka of Parbhani district in Indian state of Maharashtra.

== Demography ==
According to the 2011 census of India, Tadborgaon had a population of 2928, of which 1535 were male and 1393 were female. The average sex ratio of the village was 907, which was lower than the Maharashtra state average of 929. The literacy rate was 75.76% compared to 82.3% for the state. Male literacy rate was 84% while female literacy rate was 65%.

== Geography and Transport ==
Following table shows distance of Tadborgaon from some of major cities.

City	Distance (km)
Nanded	86
Selu	20
Manwath	16
Parbhani	22
Aurangabad	165
Mumbai	495
