= Mangangaon, Parbhani =

Village in Maharashtra

Mangangaon
- Village
- Location in Maharashtra, India 19°34'36"N 76°84'34"E Mangangaon (India)
- Coordinates: 19.343618°N 76.843481°E
- Country: India
- State: Maharashtra
- District: Parbhani

Government
  - Type: Gram panchayat
  - Sarpanch: K. MULE

Population (2011)
  - Total: 1,398
- Demonym: Mangangaonkar

Languages
  - Official: Marathi
- Time zone: UTC+5:30 (IST)
- PIN: 431402
- Telephone code: 02452
- ISO 3166 code: IN-MH
- Vehicle registration: MH-22

Mangangaon is a village in Parbhani taluka of Parbhani district of Maharashtra state in India.

== Demography ==
According to the 2011 census of India, Mangangaon had a population of 1398, of which 737 were male and 664 were female. The average sex ratio of the village was 905, which was lower than the Maharashtra state average of 929. The literacy rate was 75.98% compared to 82.3% for the state. Male literacy rate was 85% while female literacy rate was 66%.

== Geography and Transport ==
Following table shows distance of Mangangaon from some of major cities.

City	Distance (km)
Parbhani	13
Jintur	44
Manwath	47
Nanded	71
Aurangabad	205
Mumbai	520
