= Sultanpur, Parbhani =

Village in Maharashtra

Sultanpur
- Village
- Location in Maharashtra, India 19°36'08"N 76°76'31"E Sultanpur (India)
- Coordinates: 19.360849°N 76.763153°E
- Country: India
- State: Maharashtra
- District: Parbhani

Government
  - Type: Gram panchayat

Population (2011)
  - Total: 70
- Demonym: Sultanpurkar

Languages
  - Official: Marathi
- Time zone: UTC+5:30 (IST)
- PIN: 431540
- Telephone code: 02452
- ISO 3166 code: IN-MH
- Vehicle registration: MH-22

Sultanpur is a small village in Parbhani taluka of Parbhani district of Maharashtra state in India.

== Demography ==
According to the 2011 census of India, Sultanpur had a population of 70, of which 34 were male and 36 were female. The average sex ratio of the village was 1059, which was lower than the Maharashtra state average of 929. The literacy rate was 68.75% compared to 82.3% for the state. Male literacy rate was 87% while female literacy rate was 51%.

== Geography and Transport ==
Following table shows distance of Sultanpur from some of major cities.

City	Distance (km)
Parbhani	17
Jintur	33
Manwath	43
Nanded	78
Aurangabad	189
Mumbai	521
