= Dhanora Motya =

Village in Maharashtra

Dhanora Dhanora Motya
- Village
- Location in Maharashtra Dhanora (India)
- Coordinates: 19°5′0″N 77°8′0″E
- Country: India
- State: Maharashtra
- District: Parbhani

Government
  - Type: Grampanchayat
- Elevation: 384 m (1,260 ft)

Population (2011)
  - Total: 2,927

Languages
  - Official: Marathi
- Time zone: UTC+5:30 (IST)
- PIN: 431511
- Telephone code: 02452
- Vehicle registration: MH-22

Dhanora, commonly known as "Dhanora Motya" is a village located in Purna taluka of Parbhani district, in the state of Maharashtra, India.

== Demographics ==
As per 2011 census:

- Dhanora Motya has 625 families residing. The village has population of 2927.
- Out of the population of 2827, 1473 are males while 1454 are females.
- Literacy rate of the village is 72.55%.
- Average sex ratio of the village is 987 females to 1000 males. Average sex ratio of Maharashtra state is 929.

== Location ==
Distance between Dhanora Motya, and district headquarter Parbhani is 48 kilometres (30 mi).
