= Pathra, Parbhani =

Village in Maharashtra

Pathra
- Village
- Location in Maharashtra, India 19°16'19"N 76°84'68"E Pathra (India)
- Coordinates: 19.161968°N 76.846840°E
- Country: India
- State: Maharashtra
- District: Parbhani

Government
  - Type: Gram panchayat

Population (2011)
  - Total: 1,325
- Demonym: Pathrakar

Languages
  - Official: Marathi
- Time zone: UTC+5:30 (IST)
- PIN: 431402
- Telephone code: 02452
- ISO 3166 code: IN-MH
- Vehicle registration: MH-22

Pathra also known as Pathara is a village in Parbhani taluka of Parbhani district of Maharashtra state in India.

== Demography ==
According to the 2011 census of India, Pathra had a population of 1324, of which 677 were male and 448 were female. The average sex ratio of the village was 957, which was higher than the Maharashtra state average of 929. The literacy rate was 71.69% compared to 82.3% for the state. Male literacy rate was 82% while female literacy rate was 60%.

== Geography and transport ==
Following table shows distance of Pathra from some of major cities.

City	Distance (km)
Parbhani	18
Purna	36
Manwath	53
Nanded	63
Aurangabad	174
Mumbai	525
