= Mirkhel =

Village in Maharashtra

- Village/Railway station
- Location in Maharashtra Mirkhel (India)
- Coordinates: 19.2038109°N 76.9155578°E
- Country: India
- State: Maharashtra
- District: Parbhani

Government
  - Type: Gram panchayat
- Elevation: 414 m (1,358 ft)

Population (2011)
  - Total: 2,283
- Demonym: Mirkhelkar

Languages
  - Official: Marathi
- Time zone: UTC+5:30 (IST)
- PIN: 431402
- Telephone code: 02452
- ISO 3166 code: IN-MH
- Vehicle registration: MH-22

Mirkhel is a village and railway station in Parbhani taluka of Parbhani district in the Indian state of Maharashtra.

== Demography ==
- As per 2011 census, Mirkhel has total 435 families residing. Village has population of 2,283 of which 1,166 were males while 1,117 were females.
- Average Sex Ratio of village is 958 which is higher than Maharashtra state average of 929.
- Literacy rate of village was 77% compared to 82.3% of Maharashtra. Male literacy rate was 85% while female literacy rate was 68%.
- Schedule Caste (SC) constitutes 26% of total population.

== Mirkhel Railway Station ==
Mirkhel Railway Station is 3 kilometres (1.9 mi) from Mirkhel village.

Parameter	Detail
Station code	MQL
Zone	SCR (South Central)
Division	Hazur Sahib Nanded
District	Parbhani
Platforms	1
Halting Trains	17
Track	Diesel

== Geography and transport ==
Following table shows distance of Mirkhel from some of major cities.

City	Distance (km)
Nanded	49
Purna	15
Loha	40
Parbhani	15
Aurangabad	193
Mumbai	496
