= Kaudgaon, Parbhani =

Village in Maharashtra

Kaudgaon
- Village
- Location in Maharashtra, India 19°26'17"N 76°73'16"E Kaudgaon (India)
- Coordinates: 19.261728°N 76.731625°E
- Country: India
- State: Maharashtra
- District: Parbhani

Government
  - Type: Gram panchayat
  - Sarpanch: Panchal Pandurang

Population (2011)
  - Total: 2,005
- Demonym: Kaudgaonkar

Languages
  - Official: Marathi
- Time zone: UTC+5:30 (IST)
- PIN: 431401
- Telephone code: 02452
- ISO 3166 code: IN-MH
- Vehicle registration: MH-22

Kaudgaon is a village in Parbhani taluka of Parbhani district of Maharashtra state in India.

== Demography ==
According to the 2011 census of India, Kaudgaon had a population of 2005, of which 1021 were male and 984 were female. The average sex ratio of the village was 964, which was higher than the Maharashtra state average of 929. The literacy rate was 70.54% compared to 82.3% for the state. Male literacy rate was 81% while female literacy rate was 59%.

== Geography and Transport ==
Following table shows distance of Kaudgaon from some of major cities.

City	Distance (km)
Parbhani	8
Manwath	30
Gangakhed	50
Nanded	76
Aurangabad	178
Mumbai	512
