= Pingali, Parbhani =

Village in Maharashtra

Pingali
- Village/Railway station
- Location in Maharashtra Pingali (India)
- Coordinates: 19.2121365°N 76.8541648°E
- Country: India
- State: Maharashtra
- District: Parbhani

Government
  - Type: Gram panchayat
- Elevation: 414 m (1,358 ft)

Population (2011)
  - Total: 6,403
- Demonym: Pingalikar

Languages
  - Official: Marathi
- Time zone: UTC+5:30 (IST)
- PIN: 431402
- Telephone code: 02452
- Vehicle registration: MH-22

Pingali also known as Pingali Kothala is a village and railway station in Parbhani taluka of Parbhani district in the Indian state of Maharashtra.

== Demography ==
According to the 2011 census of India, Pingali had 1,345 households and a population of 6,403, of which 3,222 were male and 3,181 were female. The average sex ratio of the village was 987, which was higher than the Maharashtra state average of 929. The literacy rate was 71% compared to 82.3% for the state. Male literacy rate was 81% while female literacy rate was 61%.

Schedule Caste constituted 19% of total population.

== Pingali Railway Station ==
Pingali Railway Station is away from village Pingali Kothala.

Parameter	Detail
Station code	PIZ
Zone	SCR (South Central)
Division	Hazur Sahib Nanded
District	Parbhani
Platforms	4
Halting Trains	21
Track	Diesel

== Geography and Transport ==
Following table shows distance of Pingali from some of major cities.

City	Distance (km)
Nanded	64
Purna	31
Manwath	33
Parbhani	10
Aurangabad	212
Mumbai	483
