= Shahapur, Parbhani =

Village in Maharashtra

Shahapur
- Village
- Location in Maharashtra, India 19°33'15"N 76°71'36"E Shahapur (India)
- Coordinates: 19.331571°N 76.713635°E
- Country: India
- State: Maharashtra
- District: Parbhani

Government
  - Type: Gram panchayat

Population (2011)
  - Total: 1,284
- Demonym: Shahapurkar

Languages
  - Official: Marathi
- Time zone: UTC+5:30 (IST)
- PIN: 431540
- Telephone code: 02452
- ISO 3166 code: IN-MH
- Vehicle registration: MH-22

Shahapur is a village in Parbhani taluka of Parbhani district of Maharashtra state in India.

== Demography ==
According to the 2011 census of India, Shahapur had a population of 1284, of which 665 were male and 619 were female. The average sex ratio of the village was 931, which was above than the Maharashtra state average of 929. The literacy rate was 69.55% compared to 82.3% for the state. The male literacy rate was 78%, while the female literacy rate was 59%.

== Geography and Transport ==
Following table shows distance of Shahapur from some of major cities.

| City | Distance (km) |
|---|---|
| Parbhani | 14 |
| Jintur | 37 |
| Manwath | 43 |
| Nanded | 84 |
| Aurangabad | 193 |
| Mumbai | 515 |
