= Kekarjawala =

Village in Maharashtra

Kekarjawala or Kekar Jawala is a village in the Parbhani district of Maharashtra, India. It is a part of the Manwath taluka. According to the 2011 census of India, it has a population of 4,484.

== Common Service Center ==
There is a Common service centre in kekarjawala where citizens of kekarjawala can avail various government services offered by government of India and government of maharashtra. The centre is operated by Mr. Santosh Kekarjawalekar.
