= Dhar, Parbhani =

Village in Maharashtra

Dhar
- Village
- Location in Maharashtra, India 19°33'11"N 76°84'34"E Dhar (India)
- Coordinates: 19.331122°N 76.843495°E
- Country: India
- State: Maharashtra
- District: Parbhani

Government
  - Type: Gram panchayat

Population (2011)
  - Total: 1,102
- Demonym: Dharkar

Languages
  - Official: Marathi
- Time zone: UTC+5:30 (IST)
- PIN: 431402
- Telephone code: 02452
- ISO 3166 code: IN-MH
- Vehicle registration: MH-22

Dhar is a village in Parbhani taluka of Parbhani district of Maharashtra state in India.

== Demography ==
According to the 2011 census of India, Dhar had a population of 1102, of which 572 were male and 530 were female. The average sex ratio of the village was 927, which was lower than the Maharashtra state average of 929. The literacy rate was 72.48% compared to 82.3% for the state. Male literacy rate was 84% while female literacy rate was 60%.

== Geography and Transport ==
Following table shows distance of Dhar from some of major cities.

City	Distance (km)
Nanded	64
Purna	31
Manwath	33
Parbhani	10
Aurangabad	202
Mumbai	473
