= Dharmapuri, Parbhani =

Village in Maharashtra

Dharmapuri
- Village
- Location in Maharashtra, India 19°18'44"N 76°44'32"E Dharmapuri (India)
- Coordinates: 19°18′44″N 76°44′32″E
- Country: India
- State: Maharashtra
- District: Parbhani

Government
  - Type: Gram panchayat

Population (2011)
  - Total: 3,301
- Demonym: Dharmapurikar

Languages
  - Official: Marathi
- Time zone: UTC+5:30 (IST)
- PIN: 431540
- Telephone code: 02452
- ISO 3166 code: IN-MH
- Vehicle registration: MH-22

Dharmapuri is a village in Parbhani taluka of Parbhani district of Maharashtra state in India.

== Demography ==
According to the 2011 census of India, Dharmapuri had a population of 3301, of which 1854 were male and 1447 were female. The average sex ratio of the village was 780, which was lower than the Maharashtra state average of 929. The literacy rate was 75.53% compared to 82.3% for the state. Male literacy rate was 85% while female literacy rate was 62%.

== Geography and Transport ==
Following table shows distance of Dharmapuri from some of major cities.

City	Distance (km)
Parbhani	6
Jintur	40
Nanded	72
Sailu	50
Aurangabad	183
Mumbai	455
