= Mirzapur, Parbhani =

Village in Maharashtra

Mirzapur
- Village
- Location within Maharashtra Location within India
- Coordinates: 19°23′27″N 76°48′29″E
- Country: India
- State: Maharashtra
- District: Parbhani

Government
  - Type: Gram panchayat

Population (2011)
  - Total: 751
- Demonym: Mirzapurkar

Languages
  - Official: Marathi
- Time zone: UTC+5:30 (IST)
- PIN: 431540
- Telephone code: 02452
- ISO 3166 code: IN-MH
- Vehicle registration: MH-22

Mirzapur is a village in Parbhani taluka of Parbhani district of Maharashtra state in India.

== Demography ==
According to the 2011 census of India, Mirzapur had a population of 751, of which 395 were male and 356 were female. The average sex ratio of the village was 901, which was lower than the Maharashtra state average of 929. The literacy rate was 72.84% compared to 82.3% for the state. Male literacy rate was 83% while female literacy rate was 61%.

== Geography and transport ==
Following table shows distance of Mirzapur from some of major cities.

City	Distance (km)
Nanded	66
Purna	32
Manwath	34
Parbhani	11
Aurangabad	205
Mumbai	475
