= Nandkheda, Parbhani =

Village in Maharashtra

Nandkheda
- Village
- Location in Maharashtra, India 19°31'77"N 76°78'58"E Nandkheda (India)
- Coordinates: 19.3177°N 76.7858°E
- Country: India
- State: Maharashtra
- District: Parbhani

Government
  - Type: Gram panchayat

Population (2011)
  - Total: 2,295
- Demonym: Nandkhedkar

Languages
  - Official: Marathi
- Time zone: UTC+5:30 (IST)
- PIN: 431402
- Telephone code: 02452
- ISO 3166 code: IN-MH
- Vehicle registration: MH-22

Nandkheda is a village in Parbhani taluka of Parbhani district of Maharashtra state in India.

== Demography ==
According to the 2011 census of India, Nandkheda had a population of 2295, of which 1175 were male and 1120 were female. The average sex ratio of the village was 953, which was above than the Maharashtra state average of 929. The literacy rate was 69.87% compared to 82.3% for the state. Male literacy rate was 78% while female literacy rate was 62%.

== Geography and Transport ==
Following table shows distance of Nandkheda from some of major cities.

City	Distance (km)
Parbhani	07.5
Jintur	40
Sailu	48
Nanded	77
Aurangabad	196
Mumbai	511
