= Takli Kumbhakarna =

Village in Maharashtra

- Village
- Location in Maharashtra, India 19°33'87"N 76°75'02"E Takli Kumbhakarna (India)
- Coordinates: 19.338781°N 76.84750251°E
- Country: India
- State: Maharashtra
- District: Parbhani

Government
  - Type: Gram panchayat

Population (2011)
  - Total: 7,045
- Demonym: Taklikar

Languages
  - Official: Marathi
- Time zone: UTC+5:30 (IST)
- PIN: 431540
- Telephone code: 02452
- ISO 3166 code: IN-MH
- Vehicle registration: MH-22

Takli Kumbhakarna also known as Takli is a village in Parbhani taluka of Parbhani district of Maharashtra state in India.

== Demography ==
According to the 2011 census of India, Takli Kumbhakarna had a population of 7045, of which 3554 were male and 3493 were female. The average sex ratio of the village was 982, which was above than the Maharashtra state average of 929. The literacy rate was 68.94% compared to 82.3% for the state. Male literacy rate was 79% while female literacy rate was 58%.

== Geography and Transport ==
Following table shows distance of Takli Kumbhakarna from some of major cities.

City	Distance (km)
Parbhani	10
Jintur	34
Sailu	49
Nanded	80
Aurangabad	190
Mumbai	512
