= Wangi, Parbhani =

Village in Maharashtra in India

Wangi
- Village
- Location in Maharashtra, India 19°16'19"N 76°84'68"E Wangi (India)
- Coordinates: 19.281174°N 76.819634°E
- Country: India
- State: Maharashtra
- District: Parbhani

Government
  - Type: Gram panchayat
  - Sarpanch: Devidas Shinde

Population (2011)
  - Total: 2,273
- Demonym: Wangikar

Languages
  - Official: Marathi
- Time zone: UTC+5:30 (IST)
- PIN: 431402
- Telephone code: 02452
- ISO 3166 code: IN-MH
- Vehicle registration: MH-22

Wangi is a village in Parbhani taluka of Parbhani district of Maharashtra state in India.

== Demography ==
According to the 2011 census of India, Wangi had a population of 2273, of which 1148 were male and 1125 were female. The average sex ratio of the village was 980, which was higher than the Maharashtra state average of 929. The literacy rate was 72.55% compared to 82.3% for the state. Male literacy rate was 83% while female literacy rate was 61%.

== Geography and Transport ==
Following table shows distance of Wangi from some of major cities.

| City | Distance (km) |
|---|---|
| Parbhani | 06 |
| Purna | 39 |
| Jintur | 47 |
| Nanded | 76 |
| Aurangabad | 198 |
| Mumbai | 513 |
