= Balsa, Parbhani =

Village in Maharashtra

Balsa
- Village
- Location in Maharashtra, India 19°22'26"N 76°78'93"E Balsa (India)
- Coordinates: 19.222695°N 76.789379°E
- Country: India
- State: Maharashtra
- District: Parbhani

Government
  - Type: Gram panchayat

Population (2011)
  - Total: 1,314
- Demonym: Balsekar

Languages
  - Official: Marathi
- Time zone: UTC+5:30 (IST)
- PIN: 431401
- Telephone code: 02452
- ISO 3166 code: IN-MH
- Vehicle registration: MH-22

Balsa also known as Balsa Khurd is a village in Parbhani taluka of Parbhani district of Maharashtra state in India.

== Demography ==
According to the 2011 census of India, Balsa had a population of 1314, of which 711 were male and 603 were female. The average sex ratio of the village was 848, which was lower than the Maharashtra state average of 929. The literacy rate was 79.85% compared to 82.3% for the state. Male literacy rate was 92% while female literacy rate was 65%.

== Geography and Transport ==
Following table shows distance of Balsa from some of major cities.

City	Distance (km)
Parbhani	05
Purna	37
Nanded	76
Aurangabad	198
Mumbai	510
