= Mukundrao =

Mukundrao is a given name. People with the name include:

- Mukundrao Pai
- Mukundrao Pedgaonkar
