= Mandwa, Parbhani =

Village in Maharashtra

Mandwa
- Village
- Location in Maharashtra, India 19°38'62"N 76°73'17"E Mandwa (India)
- Coordinates: 19.386232°N 76.731737°E
- Country: India
- State: Maharashtra
- District: Parbhani

Government
  - Type: Gram Panchayat

Population (2011)
  - Total: 1,114
- Demonym: Mandwekar

Languages
  - Official: Marathi
- Time zone: UTC+5:30 (IST)
- PIN: 431540
- Telephone code: 02452
- ISO 3166 code: IN-MH
- Vehicle registration: MH-22

Mandawa also known as Mandwa is a village in Parbhani taluka of Parbhani district of Maharashtra state in India, situated on the banks of river Dudhana, 3 km towards West from Jintur- Parbhani section of NH752K Highway. As for administrative setup, the village Mandawa is covered under Zari Revenue Mandal, and for policing purpose it falls within the limits of "Parbhani Rural Police station". Mandawa has pre- primary, primary & secondary schooling facility.

Main occupation of residents of village Mandawa is Agriculture. Gifted with Black Cotton Soil the major crops cultivated are Soybean, Pigeon Pea, Cotton, Turmeric, Green Gram, Sorghum, Bengal Gram, vegetables like Tomato, Okra, Cucumber, flowers like Rose, Chrysanthemums, Marigold.

Gokulwadi is adjacent uninhabited village attached to Mandawa. Both Gokulwadi & Mandawa are now being covered under Lower Dudhana Project's Right arm canals, thereby increasing the effective irrigation potential.

Nearest Banking facility is available at Zari which is served by branches of "State Bank of India" (Branch+ ATM) and also the Parbhani District Central Cooperative (PDCC) Bank. Nearest fuel Station is "HP- Vikrant Petroleum" at Zari. Nearest Government Primary Health Center & Veterinary clinic is available at Zari while Secondary & Tertiary Healthcare facilities are available at Parbhani District Headquarters.

Mandawa is part of Parbhani (Lok Sabha constituency) for Indian General elections and current member of Parliament representing this constituency is Sanjay Haribhau Jadhav of Shiv Sena.

Mandawa is part of Parbhani (Vidhan Sabha constituency) for Assembly elections of Maharashtra. Current representative from this constituency in Maharashtra state assembly is Rahul Vedprakash Patil of Shiv Sena.

By Virtue of being situated at the banks of river Dudhana, the surroundings are rich in biodiversity, local residents have reported various snakes, fish, deer, fox, peacock, wild pigs, Gray Langur/ Hanuman Langur, squirrel, rabbit, Monitor Lizard, snail in vicinity of the village. The floral diversity is also high, with plants like Azadirachta indica (Neem), Indian sandalwood (Chandan), Neolamarckia cadamba (Kadamb), Acacia (Babool), Ficus religiosa (Peepal), Indian banyan, Ficus racemosa, Butea Monosperma, Native Mango species etc.

== Demography ==
According to the 2011 census of India, Mandawa had a population of 1114, of which 569 were male and 545 were female. The average sex ratio of the village was 958, which was higher than the Maharashtra state average of 929. The literacy rate was 70.93% compared to 82.3% for the state. Male literacy rate was 83% while female literacy rate was 56%.

== Geography and Transport ==
Following table shows distance of Mandawa from some of major cities.

City	Distance (km)
Parbhani	20
Jintur	31
Purna	55
Nanded	90
Aurangabad	178
Mumbai	521

Nearest Railway Station is Parbhani Junction.
