= Bramhangaon, Parbhani =

Village in Maharashtra

Bramhangaon
- Village
- Location in Maharashtra, India 19°23'70"N 76°72'83"E Bramhangaon (India)
- Coordinates: 19.237057°N 76.728338°E
- Country: India
- State: Maharashtra
- District: Parbhani

Government
  - Type: Gram panchayat

Population (2011)
  - Total: 3,004
- Demonym: Bramhangaongaonkar

Languages
  - Official: Marathi
- Time zone: UTC+5:30 (IST)
- PIN: 431402
- Telephone code: 02452 registration_plate = MH-22
- ISO 3166 code: IN-MH

Bramhangaon also known as Bramangaon is a village in Parbhani taluka of Parbhani district of Maharashtra state in India.

== Demography ==
According to the 2011 census of India, Bramhangaon had a population of 3004, of which 1582 were male and 1422 were female. The average sex ratio of the village was 899, which was lower than the Maharashtra state average of 929. The literacy rate was 71.59% compared to 82.3% for the state. Male literacy rate was 81% while female literacy rate was 60%.

== Geography and transport ==
Following table shows distance of Bramhangaon from some of major cities.

City	Distance (km)
Parbhani	06
Gangakhed	34
Nanded	76
Aurangabad	198
Mumbai	497
