= Jamb, Parbhani =

Village in Maharashtra

Jamb
- Village
- Nickname: Jamkar
- Location in Maharashtra, India Jamb (India)
- Coordinates: 19.274276°N 76.681949°E
- Country: India
- State: Maharashtra
- District: Parbhani

Government
  - Type: Grampanchayat
  - Sarpanch: Rambhau Renge

Population (2011)
  - Total: 4,835
- Demonym: Jambkar/Jamkar

Languages
  - Official: Marathi
- Time zone: UTC+5:30 (IST)
- PIN: 431537
- Telephone code: 02452
- ISO 3166 code: IN-MH
- Vehicle registration: MH-22

Jamb, also known as Jam, is a village in Parbhani taluka of Parbhani district of Maharashtra state in India.

== Demography ==
According to the 2011 census of India, Jamb had a population of 4835, of which 2485 were male and 2350 were female. The average sex ratio of the village was 946, which was above than the Maharashtra state average of 929. The literacy rate was 70.74% compared to 82.3% for the state. The male literacy rate was 80% while the female literacy rate was 60%.
