= Takli Bobade =

Village in Maharashtra

- Village
- Location in Maharashtra, India 19°40'81"N 76°86'86"E Takli Bobade (India)
- Coordinates: 19.408120°N 76.868628°E
- Country: India
- State: Maharashtra
- District: Parbhani

Government
  - Type: Gram panchayat

Population (2011)
  - Total: 2,882
- Demonym: Taklikar

Languages
  - Official: Marathi
- Time zone: UTC+5:30 (IST)
- PIN: 431402
- Telephone code: 02452 registration_plate = MH-22
- ISO 3166 code: IN-MH

Takli Bobade is a village in Parbhani taluka of Parbhani district of Maharashtra state in India.

== Demography ==
According to the 2011 census of India, Takli Bobade had a population of 2882, of which 1502 were male and 1380 were female. The average sex ratio of the village was 919, which was lower than the Maharashtra state average of 929. The literacy rate was 67.58% compared to 82.3% for the state. Male literacy rate was 78% while female literacy rate was 66%.

== Geography and Transport ==
Following table shows distance of Takli Bobade from some of major cities.

City	Distance (km)
Parbhani	29
Basmat	38
Purna	35
Nanded	70
Aurangabad	191
Mumbai	513
