= Varpud, Parbhani =

Village in Maharashtra

Varpud
- Village
- Location in Maharashtra, India 19°18'10"N 76°88'71"E Varpud (India)
- Coordinates: 19.181095°N 76.887180°E
- Country: India
- State: Maharashtra
- District: Parbhani

Government
  - Type: Gram panchayat

Population (2011)
  - Total: 243
- Demonym: Varpudkar

Languages
  - Official: Marathi
- Time zone: UTC+5:30 (IST)
- PIN: 431401
- Telephone code: 02452
- ISO 3166 code: IN-MH
- Vehicle registration: MH-22

Varpud also known as Warpud is a village in Parbhani taluka of Parbhani district of Maharashtra state in India.

== Demography ==
According to the 2011 census of India, Varpud had a population of 243, of which 124 were male and 119 were female. The average sex ratio of the village was 960, which was higher than the Maharashtra state average of 929. The literacy rate was 92.73% compared to 82.3% for the state. Male literacy rate was 97% while female literacy rate was 88%.

== Geography and Transport ==
Following table shows distance of Varpud from some of major cities.

City	Distance (km)
Parbhani	16
Purna	16
Gangakhed	47
Nanded	52
Aurangabad	211
Mumbai	525
