= Ukhalad =

Village in Maharashtra

Ukhalad Dhangarwadi
- Village
- Location in Maharashtra, India 19°25'15"N 76°89'85"E Ukhalad (India)
- Coordinates: 19.251554°N 76.898575°E
- Country: India
- State: Maharashtra
- District: Parbhani
- Founder: Paraji Trimukh Narwade

Government
  - Type: Gram panchayat
  - Sarpanch: SAU Dropada Hanuman Bagal And other 10 Members

Population (2011)
  - Total: 3,069
- Demonym: Ukhaladkar

Languages
  - Official: Marathi
- Time zone: UTC+5:30 (IST)
- PIN: 431402
- Telephone code: 02452
- ISO 3166 code: IN-MH
- Vehicle registration: MH-22

Ukhalad, also known as Dhangarwadi, is in Parbhani district, in Maharashtra, India.

Some temples are there - Khandoba, Omkareshwar, Vitthal- Rukhminee, Hanuman mandir, Mahadev .etc

== Demography ==
According to the 2011 census of India, Ukhalad had a population of 3069, of which 1770 were male and 1599 were female. The average sex ratio of the village was 903, which was lower than the Maharashtra state average of 929. The literacy rate was 70.52% compared to 82.3% for the state. Male literacy rate was 79% while female literacy rate was 60%.

== Geography and Transport ==
Following table shows distance of Ukhalad from some of major cities.

City	Distance (km)
Nanded	53
Purna	18
Basmat	38
Parbhani	16
Aurangabad	211
Mumbai	525
