= Raipur, Parbhani =

Village in Maharashtra

Raipur
- Village
- Location in Maharashtra, India 19°23'45"N 76°77'46"E Raipur (India)
- Coordinates: 19.2345720°N 76.7746845°E
- Country: India
- State: Maharashtra
- District: Parbhani

Government
  - Type: Gram panchayat

Population (2011)
  - Total: 1,442
- Demonym: Raipurkar

Languages
  - Official: Marathi
- Time zone: UTC+5:30 (IST)
- PIN: 431401
- Telephone code: 02452
- ISO 3166 code: IN-MH
- Vehicle registration: MH-22

Raipur is a village in Parbhani taluka of Parbhani district of Maharashtra state in India.

== Demography ==
According to the 2011 census of India, Raipur had a population of 1442, of which 765 were male and 677 were female. The average sex ratio of the village was 885, which was lower than the Maharashtra state average of 929. The literacy rate was 76.97% compared to 82.3% for the state. Male literacy rate was 87% while female literacy rate was 65%.

== Geography and Transport ==
Following table shows distance of Raipur from some of major cities.

City	Distance (km)
Parbhani	06
Purna	38
Nanded	75
Aurangabad	197
Mumbai	512
