= Waghala =

Waghala may refer to:

== Places ==
- Waghala, Nanded district, a village in Nanded district in Maharashtra state in India
- Waghala, Parbhani district, a village in Parbhani district in Maharashtra state in India
