= Pedgaon =

Pedgaon may refer to:

- Pedgaon, Ahmednagar, a village in Ahmednagar district of Maharashtra state of India
- Pedgaon, Parbhani, a village and railway station in Parbhani district of Maharashtra state of India
