= Sendra =

Village in Maharashtra

- Village
- Location in Maharashtra, India 19°22'43"N 76°82'11"E Sendra (India)
- Coordinates: 19.224336°N 76.821171°E
- Country: India
- State: Maharashtra
- District: Parbhani

Government
  - Type: Gram panchayat

Population (2011)
  - Total: 1,526
- Demonym: Sendrekar

Languages
  - Official: Marathi
- Time zone: UTC+5:30 (IST)
- PIN: 431402
- Telephone code: 02452
- ISO 3166 code: IN-MH
- Vehicle registration: MH-22

Sendra also known as Shendra is a village in Parbhani taluka of Parbhani district of Maharashtra state in India.

== Demography ==
According to the 2011 census of India, Sendra had a population of 1,526, of which 792 were male and 734 were female. The average sex ratio of the village was 927, which was lower than the Maharashtra state average of 929. The literacy rate was 68.9% compared to 82.3% for the state. Male literacy rate was 79% while female literacy rate was 57%.
