= Masoli =

Masoli may refer to

- Jeremiah Masoli (born 1988), American football quarterback
- Masoli Dam in Maharashtra, India
