= Karpara Dam =

- Location within Maharashtra
- Official name: Karpara Dam D01286
- Location: Jintur
- Coordinates: 19.5107101°N 76.6288661°E
- Opening date: 1975
- Owners: Government of Maharashtra, India

Dam and spillways
- Type of dam: Earthfill
- Impounds: Karpara river
- Height: 16.66 m (54.7 ft)
- Length: 1,046 m (3,432 ft)
- Dam volume: 344 km^{3} (83 cu mi)

Reservoir
- Total capacity: 24,700 km^{3} (5,900 cu mi)
- Surface area: 778 km^{2} (300 sq mi)

Karpara Dam, is an earthfill dam on Karpara river near Jintur, Parbhani district in state of Maharashtra in India.

== Specifications ==
The height of the dam above lowest foundation is 16.66 m (54.7 ft) while the length is 1,046 m (3,432 ft). The volume content is 344 km^{3} (83 cu mi) and gross storage capacity is 27,320.00 km^{3} (6,554.42 cu mi).

== Purpose ==
- Irrigation

== See also ==
- Dams in Maharashtra
- List of reservoirs and dams in India
