= Mukundrao Pedgaonkar =

- Born: 1897; Pedgaon, Parbhani, Maharashtra, India
- Died: 6 January 1990 (aged 93); India
- Occupation: lawyer
- Known for: Indian independence movement, Telangana Rebellion
- Political party: Hyderabad State Congress; Indian National Congress

Mukundrao Pedgaonkar (Marathi: :मुकुंदराव)(1897–1990), was an Indian Lawyer and social activist who was active during the Telangana Rebellion, during the reign of the last Nizam. He was the main leader of the Hyderabad State Congress.
