= Pathri =

Pathri Parthpur
- Town
- Location in Maharashtra, India
- Coordinates: 19.25°N 76.45°E
- Country: India
- State: Maharashtra
- District: Parbhani

Government
  - Type: Municipal Council
- Elevation: 423 m (1,388 ft)

Population (2011)
  - Total: 36,853

Language
  - Official: Marathi
- Time zone: UTC+5:30 (IST)
- Postal code: 431506
- Vehicle registration: MH-22

Pathri is a town, near the city of Parbhani and a municipal council in Parbhani district in the Indian state of Maharashtra. It has been claimed that Pathri is the real birthplace of Sai Baba, which has been subject to controversy. Maharashtra CM had initially granted Rs 100-crore for development of birthplace facilities at Pathri, but later dropped all references to 'Janmsthan'. Pathri Premier League (PPL) is a popular annual cricket tournament organised in the city to boost local cricketing talent.

Pathri was having significant importance during mediaeval era. There are still some ruins of a fort. This is the city of various Muslim Saints and Sufis. Hazrat Shah Ismail Qadri and Hazrat Sayyed Sadaat ( R.A.) are well known Sufis in the area. So many Mazars (graves) are here. It is said that there are forty Aulias and four Qutubs are resting in there Mazars in Pathri. The population is mostly dominated by Muslims, Malis, Marathas and Brahmins.This city has been known for peace, harmony, and coexistence for centuries.

== Geography ==
Pathri is located at 19.25°N 76.45°E. It has an average elevation of 423 metres (1387 feet).

== Demographics ==
As of 2011 India census, Pathri has population of 36,853 of which 19,025 are males while 17,828 are females. Pathri has Female Sex Ratio is of 937 higher than Maharashtra state average of 929. 15.1% of the population is under 6 years of age.

Literacy rate of Pathri city is 78.20% lower than state average of 82.34%. In Pathri, Male literacy is around 84.18% while female literacy rate is 71.89%.

Schedule Caste (SC) constitutes 12.04% while Schedule Tribe (ST) were 0.83% of total population in Pathri.

== Tourism ==
Datta temple in Gunj-Khurd and Renuka Devi temple at Pedgaon hold religious importance as well. Although Many people believe that Pathri is birthplace of Shri Sai Baba, there is no official documented information regarding this matter. The reference to Pathri as the birthplace of Saibaba was opposed by the Shirdi Saibaba temple trust and the residents.

== Transport ==
Pathri is a major town on National_Highway_61_(India) which connects Kalyan to Nirmal. Pathri is located 43 km (27 mi) towards west from district headquarters Parbhani. The distance between Pathri and Aurangabad is 151 km (94 mi) & distance between Pathri and Nanded is 114 km (70 mi).

Nearest railway station from Pathri is Manwath road railway station {MVO} which is 17 km (11 mi) away.

== Administration ==
Pathri comes under Parbhani (Lok Sabha constituency) for Indian general elections and current member of Parliament representing this constituency is Sanjay Haribhau Jadhav of Shiv Sena.

Pathri is part of Pathri (Vidhan Sabha constituency) for assembly elections of Maharashtra. Current representative from this constituency in Maharashtra state assembly is [Suresh Ambadasrao Warpudkar] who was Indian National Congress candidate.
