= Masoli Dam =

- Location within Maharashtra
- Official name: Masoli Dam D01365
- Location: Gangakhed
- Coordinates: 18.8978922°N 76.7454323°E
- Opening date: 1981
- Owners: Government of Maharashtra, India

Dam and spillways
- Type of dam: Earthfill
- Impounds: Masoli river
- Height: 24.84 m (81.5 ft)
- Length: 1,086 m (3,563 ft)
- Dam volume: 626 km^{3} (150 cu mi)

Reservoir
- Total capacity: 27,390 km^{3} (6,570 cu mi)
- Surface area: 6,970 km^{2} (2,690 sq mi)

Masoli Dam, is an earthfill dam on the Masoli river near Gangakhed, Parbhani district in the state of Maharashtra in India.

== Specifications ==
The height of the dam above the lowest foundation is 24.84 m (81.5 ft) while the length is 1,086 m (3,563 ft). The volume content is 626 km^{3} (150 cu mi) and gross storage capacity is 34,080.00 km^{3} (8,176.23 cu mi).

== Purpose ==
- Irrigation

== See also ==
- Dams in Maharashtra
- List of reservoirs and dams in India
