= Maharashtra Animal and Fishery Sciences University =

Indian state university

- Type: State
- Established: December 3, 2000; 25 years ago
- Chancellor: Governor of Maharashtra
- Vice-Chancellor: Dr. Niteen V. Patil
- Location: Nagpur, Maharashtra, India
- Website: mafsu.ac.in

Maharashtra Animal and Fishery Sciences University is an agriculture state university headquartered from Nagpur, Maharashtra, India. It was established under The Maharashtra Animal and Fishery Sciences University Act, 1998. It was officially established on 3 December 2000 by carving seven colleges out of the other four state agriculture universities in Maharashtra.
