= Rahul Vedprakash Patil =

India politician

Rahul Patil

Member of the Maharashtra Legislative Assembly
- Incumbent
- Assumed office (2014-2019), (2019-2024), (2024-Present)
- Preceded by: Sanjay Haribhau Jadhav
- Constituency: Parbhani

Personal details
- Born: 17 September 1975 (age 51) Parbhani
- Party: Shiv Sena(UBT)
- Other political affiliations: Shiv Sena
- Education: MBBS
- Alma mater: Government Medical College
- Occupation: Physician; politician
- Website: www.rahulpatil.org

Rahul Vedprakash Patil is an Indian politician and a member of the Maharashtra Legislative Assembly representing Parbhani from 2014 – previously as a Shiv Sena politician and now as a Shiv Sena (UBT) politician.

== Political career ==
He started his political career by contesting the Maharashtra assembly elections in 2014 as a Shiv Sena candidate from Parbhani (Vidhan Sabha constituency) and won by margin of 26524 votes. He got re-elected by margin of 81,790 votes in the 2019 Maharashtra state assembly elections.
