= Pedgaon, Parbhani =

Village in Maharashtra

Pedgaon
- Village/Railway station
- Location in Maharashtra Pedgaon (India)
- Coordinates: 19.3212767°N 76.6614783°E
- Country: India
- State: Maharashtra
- District: Parbhani

Government
  - Type: Gram panchayat
  - Sarpanch: Jitendra Deshmukh
- Elevation: 414 m (1,358 ft)

Population (2011)
  - Total: 7,708
- Demonym: Pedgaonkar

Languages
  - Official: Marathi
- Time zone: UTC+5:30 (IST)
- PIN: 431537
- Telephone code: 02452
- ISO 3166 code: IN-MH
- Vehicle registration: MH-22
- Website: maharashtra.gov.in

Pedgaon is a major village and railway station in Parbhani district in Indian state of Maharashtra.

== Demography ==
- As per 2011 census, Pedgaon has total 1,525 families residing. Village has population of 7,708 of which 3,940 were males while 3,768 were females.
- Average Sex Ratio of village is 956 which is higher than Maharashtra state average of 929.
- Literacy rate of village was 68% compared to 82.95% of Maharashtra. Male literacy rate was 77% while female literacy rate was 59%.
- Schedule Caste (SC) constitutes 15% of total population.
