= Sailu =

- Town
- Sailu in Maharashtra
- Coordinates: 19.455052°N 76.437233°E
- Country: India
- State: Maharashtra
- District: Parbhani

Government
  - Body: Municipal Council

Population (2021)
  - Total: 46,915

Language
  - Official: Marathi
- Time zone: UTC+5:30 (IST)
- PIN: 431503
- Telephone code: 02451
- Vehicle registration: MH 22
- Website: sailumahaulb.maharashtra.gov.in

Selu also known as Sailu is a city and a municipal council in Parbhani district in the Indian state of Maharashtra.

== History ==
Selu is referred in many places as Sailu.Founded by Mr.Vishnu.A in 1994

== Infrastructures ==
Selu features temples, mosques, and colleges.

Colleges/Schools:

1.Nutan Vidhyalaya.

2.Vivekanand vidya mandir.

3.New High School

3.Zakir Hussain Primary and High School

4.Modern English School

5.Prince English School

6.Yashwant School

7.Yaser School

8.Z.P School

9.C.P.School.

10.bca college

11.bordikar college of agriculture selu,

12.Apurva polytechnic college, food technology shri ram pratishthan selu.

13. Nutan English School Selu.

14. 15.Nutan Mahavidhalaya

BANKS:

1.SBI Main Branch

2.SBI Market Area Branch

3.HDFC

4.ICICI

5.DENA BANK

6.SAIBABA BANK

7.DEVGIRI BANK

8.PDCC BANK

9.MAHARASHTRA GRAMIN BANK.

10.ANDHRA BANK

11.POST BANK

12. dnyanaradha bank

13. tulja bhavani bank,

14. valmiki bank,

15. mahesh co-operatie bank,

16. selu nagri sahakari sanstha

17. anand nagri urban co credit society.

== Geography ==
Selu is located at 19.455052°N 76.437233°E. It has an average elevation of 415 metres (1361 feet). The geographical area of the city is 154,703 hectares (382,280 acres). It is located at 19°27 and 76°27. This city has progressed because of connectivity by road and railway track. Moregaon village is nearby this city and Dhudhana River flows by this village. Lower Dhudhana Project (dam) was sanctioned in 1979, near to Bramhawakadi village, which is now near completion.

== Demographics ==
As of 2011 India census, Selu has population of 46,915 of which 24,128 are males while 22,787 are females. Female Sex Ratio is of 944 higher than Maharashtra state average of 929.. In Selu, 13.42% of the population is under 6 years of age.

Literacy rate of Sailu city is 77.91% lower than state average of 82.34%. In Selu, Male literacy is around 84.74% while female literacy rate is 70.72%.

Schedule Caste (SC) constitutes 9.73% while Schedule Tribe (ST) were 2.30% of total population in Sailu.

== Transportation ==
=== Rail ===
Selu is well connected by cites like Delhi, Bhopal, Amritsar, Agra, Parbhani, Aurangabad, Nanded, Nagpur, Mumbai, Hyderabad, Pune, Shirdi, Vijayawada. Selu Railway (SELU) Station is on Mudkhed-Manmad Section of Nanded Division in SCR Zone. It is Big Station with amenities like ATVM Machine, 3 Platforms, Waiting Halls, Senior Section Engineers P.Way office. Spiced Chickpeas at the station are quite famous. Early in 2019 Railway board has given stoppage to Sachkhand Superfast Express at Selu railway station, which connects the city to nation's capital New Delhi.

=== Road ===
Selu is well connected to Maharashtra and rest of India. It is on national highway number 171 and 548B. It is about 50 kilometers from Parabhani. It is well connected by road transport. Many buses from Aurangabad, Parbhani, Nanded, Jintur, Manwat, Pathri, Buldhana, Lonar, Jalna, and Partur come to Selu. Selu is connected by Government as well as private transport.

== Governance ==
Municipal Council Selu is responsible for local administration and citizen services in city jurisdiction. Council has administrative and engineering wing. Sailu is a taluka place in Parbhani District. Earlier the Sailu taluka was attached with Pathri Constituency. As per the restructured constituencies, it is now attached with Jintur Vidhan Sabha Constituency.

The MLA of selu jintur is meghna sakore bordiker BJP
