= Manwath =

- Largest City
- Nickname: Old Manwath
- Location in Maharashtra, India
- Coordinates: 19°18′0″N 76°30′0″E
- Country: India
- State: Maharashtra
- District: Parbhani

Population (2011)
  - Total: 43,831

Languages
  - Official: Marathi
- Time zone: UTC+5:30 (IST)
- PIN: 431505
- Vehicle registration: MH 52 (Rural)
- Literacy: 78.07%
- Religion: Hindu 65.03% *Muslim26.25%
- Website: manvatmahaulb.maharashtra.gov.in

Manwath is a city with municipal council in Parbhani district in the Indian state of Maharashtra.

== Notable people ==
The following people are associated with Manwath city or Manwath taluka in Parbhani district, Maharashtra.

Name	Photo	Place of origin / association	Field	Known for
Shubham Rameshwar Kakde		Kinhola (Bk.), Manwath taluka	Student activities, research and public affairs	Student interested in public administration and international relations. He has participated in Model United Nations activities and has published work on people's perceptions of and fear of police. He also submitted the Deogiri Students Community initiative, which was reported by Lokmat Times as an effort to promote student leadership."'Deogiri Students Community' to promote student leadership". Lokmat Times.
Ashok Deshmane		Mangrul (Bk.), Manwath taluka	Social work, education	Founder of Snehwan, an organisation working with children from drought-affected and farming families. His work has been covered by Loksatta."फुलाची पाकळी!". Loksatta.
Muni Shri 108 Purnachandra Sagarji Maharaj		Manwath	Jainism	Jain Digambara monk. Born in Manwath in 1991 as Nitin Bhaiyyaji Kahekar; he received Muni Diksha in 2023."Muni Shri 108 Purnachandra Sagarji Maharaj-1991". DigJainWiki.
Madanlal Mantri		Manwath	Civic administration	Former president of the Manwath Municipal Council. He is locally remembered for municipal development works during his tenure.
Dr. Tukaram V. Munde		Manwath	Economics, academia	Professor of Economics associated with K.K.M. College, Manwath, and involved in teaching, economics research and academic activities.
Rashmi Baburao Bande		Manwath	Agricultural science	Agricultural biotechnology researcher whose academic research included work concerning drought-tolerance genes in pearl millet.

== Demographics ==
As of 2011 India census, Manwath has population of 32,488 of which 16,522 are males while 15,966 are females. Female Sex Ratio is of 966 higher than Maharashtra state average of 929. 13.73% of the population is under 6 years of age.

Literacy rate of Manwath city is 78.07% lower than state average of 82.34%. In Manwath, Male literacy is around 86.10% while female literacy rate is 69.89%.

Schedule Caste (SC) constitutes 9.21% while Schedule Tribe (ST) were 1.64% of total population in Manwath.

== Transport ==
There are two forms of government transport in Manwath –

1. Railway
2. State Transport Buses

There is a railway station named Manwath Road railway station, which is 7 km from the city. The national highway 61 also runs from the city. It is about 37 km from Parbhani. There is also a bus stand in the city.
Also go away Bypass in the city its also known as Ring Road. Indian tours and travels booking office near bus stop Manwath.

== Education ==
1. K.K.M. College
2. Z.P. School
3. Industrial Training Institute
4. Netaji Subash Vidyalaya
5. Srimati Shakuntalabai Kanchanrao Katruwar Vidyalaya
6. Shrimati Saraswati Bai Bhale Patil Vidyalaya
7. Kasturba Gandhi Vidyalaya
8. Model English School
9. Sara
10. Kasturba Gandhi Vidyalaya
11. Abdul Kalam Urdu Primary School (bangala) al-fateh
12. Iqra Urdu School, Galib Nagar (al-qureshswati primary english school)
13. Little Flower English School.
14. Saraswati Jr College
15. Royal Cliff World School

== गावांची यादी – Manwat तालुका / List of Villages in Manwat Taluka ==
खाली Manwat तालुक्यातील गावांची सूची इंग्रजी तसेच मराठीत दिलेली आहे:

क्रमांक	गावाचे नाव (इंग्रजी)	गावाचे नाव (मराठी)
1	Ambegaon Chaharun	अंबेगाव चाहरून
2	Atola	आटोळा
3	Bhosa	भोसा
4	Bondarwadi	बोंदरवाडी
5	Deulgaon Awachar	देवलगाव अवचार
6	Gogalgaon	गोगलगाव
7	Hamadapur	हमदापूर
8	Hatkarwadi	हाटकरवाडी
9	Hattalwadi	हात्तलवाडी
10	Irlad	इरळद
11	Itali	इटाळी
12	Jangamwadi	जंगमवाडी
13	Karanji	करंजी
14	Kekar Jawala	केकरजवळा
15	Khadakwadi	खडकवाडी
16	Kharba	खरबा
17	Kinhola Budruk (Kinhola BK)	किन्होळा बु्द्रुक
18	Kolha	कोल्हा
19	Kolhawadi	कोल्हवाड़ी
20	Kothala	कोथाळा
21	Kumbhari (Ganga Kinara)	कुंभारी (गंगा किनारा)
22	Lohara	लोहरा
23	Mandewadgaon	मांडेवडगांव
24	Mangrul Budruk (Mangrul Bk)	मंगरूळ बु्द्रुक
25	Mangrul Palampat	मंगरूळ पालमपत
26	Manoli	मानोली
27	Manwat Road	मानवत रोड
28	Manwat Rural	मनवत ग्रामीण
29	Nagar Jawala	नागर जवळा
30	Narlad	नरळद
31	Palodi	पाळोदी
32	Pardi (P. Takli)	पारडी (प.टाकळी)
33	Pimpla	पिंपळा
34	Pohandul	पोहंडुळ
35	Rajura	राजूरा
36	Rame Takli	रामे टाकळी
37	Rampuri Budruk (Rampuri Bk)	रामपुरी बु्द्रुक
38	Ratnapur	रत्नापुर
39	Rudhi	रुढी
40	Sakharewadi	साखरेवाडी
41	Sarangapur	सारंगापुर
42	Sawali	सावळी
43	Sawangi Magar	सर्ववंगी मगर
44	Sawargaon Khurd (Sawargaon Kh)	सावरगाव खुर्द
45	Shevadi Jahagir	शेवडी जहागीर
46	Somthana	सोमठाणा
47	Sonula	सोनुला
48	Tad Borgaon	ताड बोरगाव
49	Takli Nilwarne	टाकळी नीलवर्णे
50	Thar	थार
51	Ukkalgaon	उक्कलगाव
52	Wangi	वांगी
53	Wazur Budruk (Wazur Bk)	वझूर बु्द्रुक
54	Wazur Khurd (Wazur Kh)	वझूर खुर्द
