= Parbhani =

Parbhani {{{1}}} Parbhani
- City
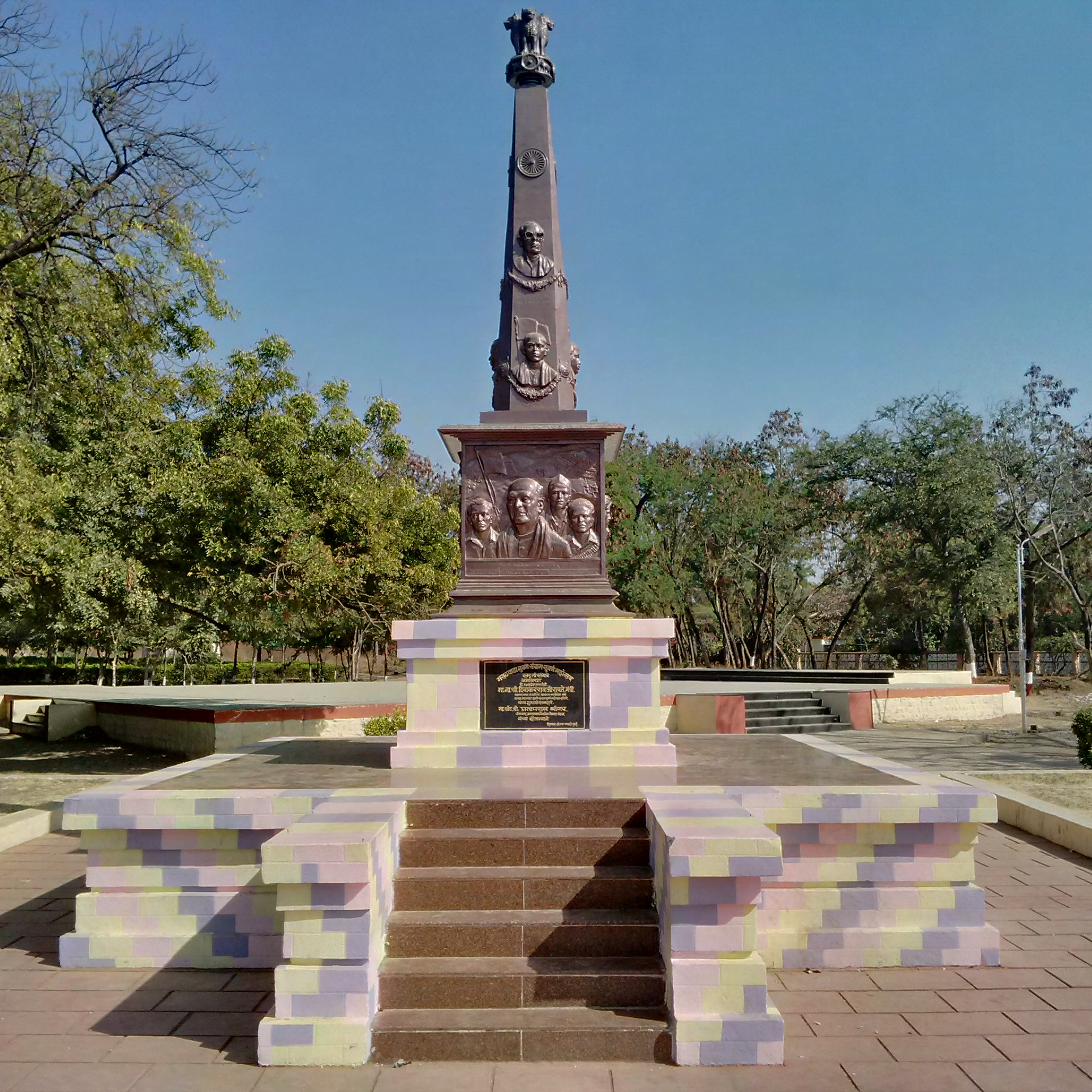
- Marathwada Martyr Monument, Parbhani; Coordinates: 19°15′33″N 76°46′59″E
- Nickname: City of Saints
- Location within Maharashtra Location within India
- Coordinates: 19.27°N 76.78°E
- Country: India
- State: Maharashtra
- Region: Marathwada
- District: Parbhani
- Established: 1610 A.D
- Named for: Goddess Prabhavati

Government
  - Type: Municipal Corporation
  - Body: Parbhani Municipal Corporation
  - Municipal Commissioner: Ramesh Pawar
  - Mayor: Syed Iqbal (Shiv Sena)
  - Deputy Mayor: Ganesh Deshmukh
  - Member of Legislative Assembly: Rahul Vedprakash Patil (Shiv Sena)
  - Member of Parliament: Sanjay Haribhau Jadhav Alias Bandu (Shiv Sena)

Area
  - City: 57.61 km^{2} (22.24 sq mi)
- Elevation: 347 m (1,138 ft)

Population (2011)
  - City: 307,170
  - Rank: India: 149th Maharashtra: 29th
  - Density: 8,128/km^{2} (21,050/sq mi)
  - Metro: 651,580
- Demonym: Parbhanikar

Language
  - Official: Marathi
- Time zone: UTC+5:30 (IST)
- PIN: 431401, and 431402
- Telephone code: +91-2452
- ISO 3166 code: IN-MH
- Vehicle registration: MH-22
- Sex ratio: 958/1000 ♂/♀
- Literacy rate: 77.75%
- Precipitation: 1,700 millimetres (67 in)
- Avg. annual temperature: 21.2 °C (70.2 °F)
- Avg. summer temperature: 49 °C (120 °F)
- Avg. winter temperature: 02.1 °C (35.8 °F)
- HDI: Medium
- Website: parbhani.gov.in

Parbhani (parbhani, Marathi pronunciation: [pəɾbʰəɳiː]) is a city in Maharashtra state of India. It is the administrative headquarters of Parbhani District. Parbhani is one of the largest cities in Marathwada region. Parbhani is around 200 kilometres (120 mi) away from regional headquarters of Aurangabad while it is 491 km (305 mi) away from the state capital Mumbai.

Along with the entire Marathwada region, Parbhani was a part of the erstwhile Nizam State; later a part of Hyderabad State; after reorganization of states in 1956 it became a part of the then-Bombay state; since 1960, it has been part of the present Maharashtra state.

Parbhani is home to Vasantrao Naik Marathwada Agricultural University, which is one of only four agriculture universities in Maharashtra. Moreover, Parbhani also has an annual festival at Turabul Haq Dargah, which attracts lakhs of tourists each year. Parbhani is named after Goddess Prabhavati.

== Etymology, and history ==
In ancient times, Parbhani was known as "Prabhavati nagari" (Marathi: प्रभावतीनगरी) on account of the existence of a massive temple of Goddess Prabhavati. The name "Prabhavati" means goddess Lakshmi and Parvati. Present name Parbhani is a corrupt form of Prabhavati.

Parbhani was for over 650 years under Muslim rule, under the Deccan sultanates, the Mughals and later the Nizam of Hyderabad. The town remained a part of the Princely State of Hyderabad under the rulership of the Nizam until Operation Polo of the Indian Army in 1948. Thereafter it became part of the independent Republic of India. Until 1956 the town remained a part of Hyderabad State within India. Under the administrative reforms that year and the break-up of the State of Hyderabad, Parbhani and the adjacent towns were transferred to the multilingual Bombay State. Since 1960 it has been a part of State of Maharashtra.

== Demographics ==
According to the 2011 census, the population of Parbhani city is 307,170. Male and female populations are 157,628 and 149,563 respectively, a ratio of 949 females per 1000 males. The average literacy rate of Parbhani city is 84.34 per cent (225,298 people), with male literacy at 90.71 per cent and female at 77.70 per cent. According to the census report, population of children (aged 0–6 years) in Parbhani city is a total of 40,075 of which 21,187 are males and 18,888 are females, a ratio of 981 females per 1000 males.

Hinduism forms a plurality in Parbhani city with 138,562 followers. Islam is the second major religion in the city of Parbhani with approximately 126,702 following it and Buddhism by 36,203, Christianity is followed by 697, Jainism by 2,870.

Language in Parbhani City (2011)
1. Marathi (55.0%)
2. Urdu (31.5%)
3. Hindi (10.4%)
4. Marwari (1.04%)
5. Other (2.00%)

At the time of the 2011 census, 55.04% of the population spoke Marathi, 31.51% Urdu, 10.41% Hindi and 1.04% Marwari as their first language.

== Cleanliness ==
According to the "Swacch Surveskshan 2018" (a cleanliness survey) under Swachh Bharat Abhiyan, Parbhani city was ranked under "greatest improvement over last year" category. Parbhani was one of the three cities of Maharashtra state to get the rank, along with Bhusawal, and Bhiwandi. In the same survey Parbhani was declared India's best city in giving citizen feedback.

== Geography and climate ==
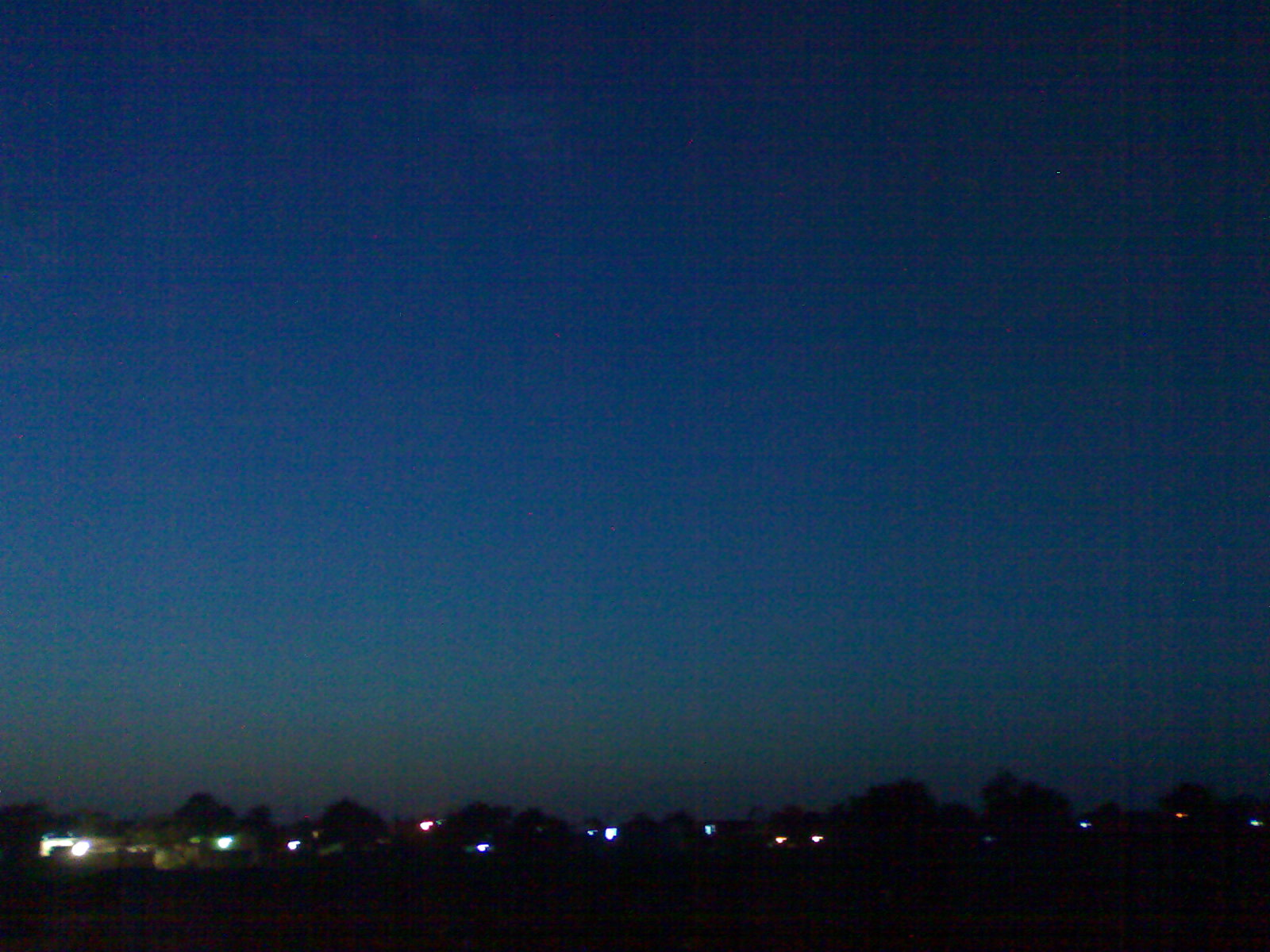
Parbhani after sunset

Parbhani is located at 19.27°N 76.78°E. It has an average elevation of 347 metres.

Parbhani district is uniformly laid by the Deccan lava flows in the form of horizontally bedded sheets, similar to Deccan trap formation of basaltic composition. Being in Godavari Valley, city's soil is very fertile, deep and rich in nutrients.

=== Climate ===
Parbhani's climate is classified as tropical. The Köppen-Geiger climate classification is Aw. When compared with winter, the summers have much more rainfall.

Climate data for Parbhani (1991–2020, extremes 1944–2020)
Month	Jan	Feb	Mar	Apr	May	Jun	Jul	Aug	Sep	Oct	Nov	Dec	Year
Record high °C (°F)	38.0 (100.4)	39.8 (103.6)	43.2 (109.8)	47.2 (117.0)	46.6 (115.9)	45.9 (114.6)	39.3 (102.7)	36.7 (98.1)	37.9 (100.2)	37.7 (99.9)	36.5 (97.7)	36.0 (96.8)	46.6 (115.9)
Mean daily maximum °C (°F)	30.1 (86.2)	33.3 (91.9)	37.3 (99.1)	40.4 (104.7)	41.9 (107.4)	36.9 (98.4)	31.7 (89.1)	30.8 (87.4)	31.7 (89.1)	32.7 (90.9)	31.3 (88.3)	29.9 (85.8)	34.0 (93.2)
Mean daily minimum °C (°F)	13.4 (56.1)	16.1 (61.0)	20.0 (68.0)	23.7 (74.7)	26.6 (79.9)	25.0 (77.0)	23.3 (73.9)	22.7 (72.9)	22.4 (72.3)	20.0 (68.0)	16.2 (61.2)	13.2 (55.8)	20.1 (68.2)
Record low °C (°F)	4.4 (39.9)	6.1 (43.0)	11.6 (52.9)	16.6 (61.9)	18.8 (65.8)	18.7 (65.7)	13.6 (56.5)	19.4 (66.9)	15.2 (59.4)	10.0 (50.0)	8.3 (46.9)	4.8 (40.6)	4.4 (39.9)
Average rainfall mm (inches)	4.9 (0.19)	4.0 (0.16)	15.5 (0.61)	6.7 (0.26)	16.6 (0.65)	150.1 (5.91)	230.2 (9.06)	204.7 (8.06)	161.1 (6.34)	80.3 (3.16)	13.8 (0.54)	2.7 (0.11)	890.6 (35.06)
Average rainy days	0.5	0.5	0.9	1.2	1.4	7.9	11.0	10.2	7.7	3.9	1.2	0.2	46.7
Average relative humidity (%) (at 17:30 IST)	39	29	23	22	24	47	65	70	68	57	51	46	45
Source: India Meteorological Department

== Education ==
In the fields of academics, the city is known mainly for the Agriculture University, and because of the university it is also known for the preparation of competitive exams for civil services like Maharashtra Public Service Commission, and Union Public Service Commission.

=== Agricultural University ===
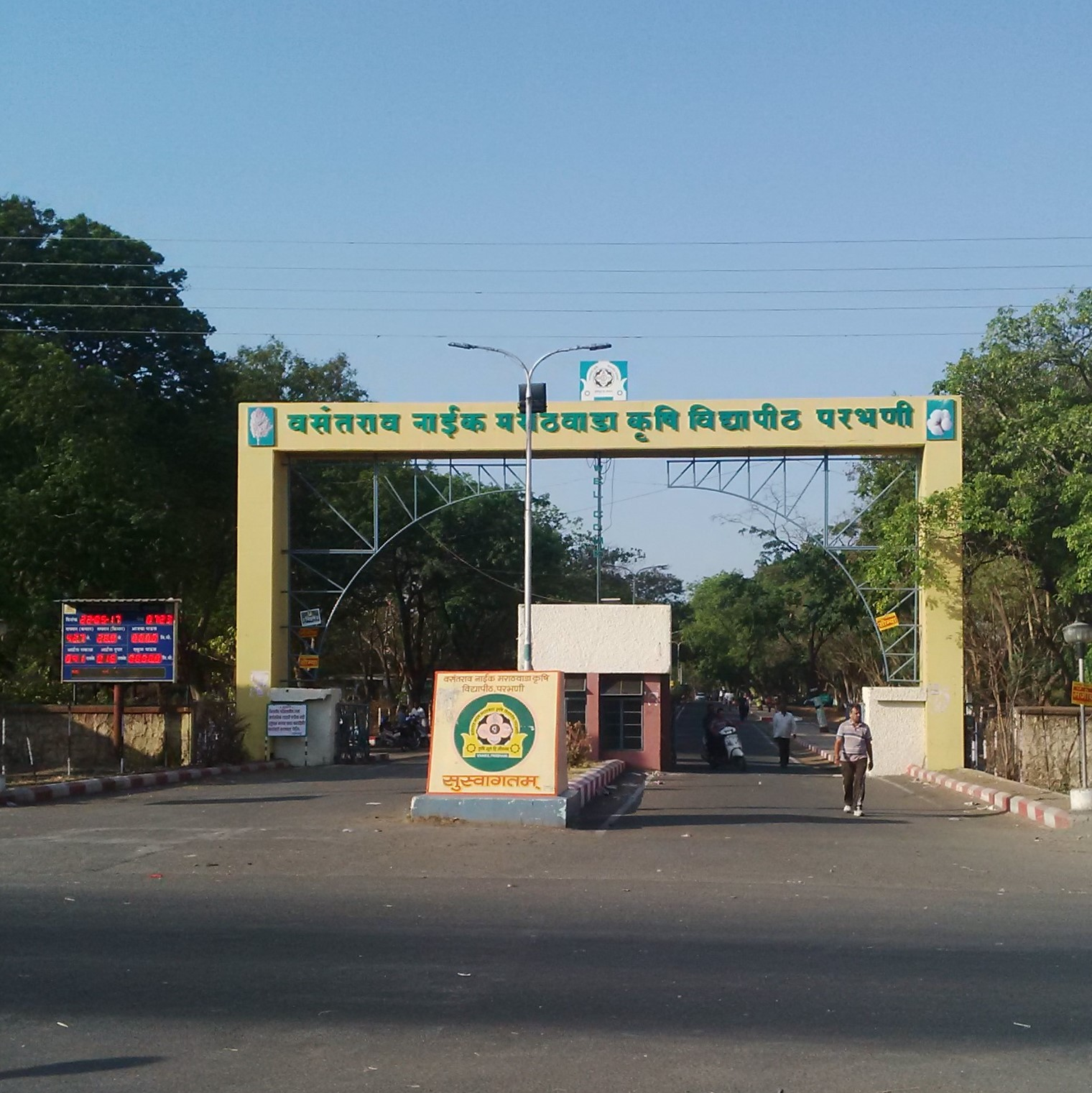
Vasantrao Naik Marathwada Agricultural University

Agricultural research in Parbhani dates back to pre-independence era. It began with the commencement of Main Experimental Farm of erstwhile Nizam State in 1918. Agricultural education was available only at Hyderabad, but crop research centres for sorghum, cotton, fruits among few others existed in Parbhani.

The first college of agriculture was established in this region at Parbhani in 1956 by the Hyderabad State Government just before the Maharashtra State reorganization. The current day Vasantrao Naik Marathwada Agricultural University (VNMAU) was established on 18 May 1972 as Marathwada Agriculture University to fulfill the regional aspirations of agrarian growth, with further responsibilities to provide education in agriculture and allied fields, and to undertake research and facilitate technology transfer in Marathwada region. It is one of the only four agricultural universities in the State of Maharashtra.

Since the 1970s, Parbhani has proved itself as the hub of educational, research, and extension activities. The famous 'Gaorani' cotton, a breed of Indian cotton, is the result of research facilities at Parbhani. The university was renamed after the name of former Chief Minister of Maharashta, Vasantrao Naik, in 2013.

"College of Veterinary and Animal Sciences" is located on the campus of VNMAU which is one of the constituent Veterinary Colleges coming under the authority of Maharashtra Animal and Fishery Sciences University, Nagpur from 2000. Earlier this college was established in 1972 as a part of Marathwada Agriculture University.

The area surrounding the gate is locally known as 'Kali Kaman' where many farmers sell their fresh produce outside the gate. The Agriculture University has helped the people of Parbhani, to maintain the environment with its vast open lots, acres of land for research and overall greenery. Many residents also make use of the campus grounds for early morning walks.

=== Colleges ===
Notable colleges in the city include Government Medical College and Hospital, Parbhani, P.D. Jain Homoeopathic Medical College, which was established in 1918, Saraswati Dhanwantari Dental College, Rajiv Gandhi College of Agriculture, and Food Technology, Beleshwar Institute of Nursing, Sitaramji Mundada Marathwada Polytechnic College, Dnyanopasak College of Arts, Commerce, Science, and Technology, Sharda Mahavidyalaya, Yeshwant College of Information Technology, Bioinformatics and Biotechnology, Dr. Zakir Hussain College, Karmayogi Dada Jr College and Godavari Shikshan Prasarak Mandal's B.Raghunath Arts, Commerce and Science College. The Shri Shivaji College in the city hosts a multitude of courses including Arts, Commerce, Science, Law, Diploma in Engineering, Engineering and Management, and Diploma in Pharmacy.

=== Schools ===
Some of the prominent junior colleges and schools from the city are: Bal Vidya Mandir High School and Jr. College, Bharatiya Bal Vidya Mandir, Dr. Zakir Hussain High School and Jr. College, Dnyansadhna Junior College, Dnyanopasak Junior College of Arts Commerce and Science, Gandhi Vidyalaya, Mahatma Phule High School, Moidul Muslimeen Urdu School, NVS Marathwada High School, Queen's School, and Shree Shivaji Junior College of Arts, Commerce, Science, and Vocational Science.

== Religion and culture ==
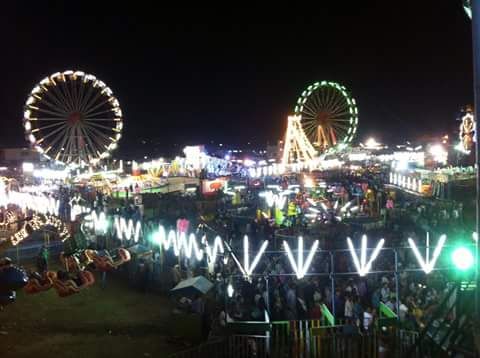
Annual Parbhani Dargah Festival

Temples in Parbhani include Shree Motha Maruti a temple of Lord Hanuman, Shree Supari Hanuman Mandir, Jabreshwar, Ashtbhuja Mandir, Pardeshwar Temple and Beleshwar Temple of Lord Mahadev, Shri Siddhivinayak Ganpati Temple of lord Ganesha, Nagraj Temple, and a temple of Maata Hingulambika. There are some more temples in the interior of Parbhani those are, Mudgaleshwar Temple at Mudgal- a village in Manwat, Pingaleshwar Temple in Pingli, Dharasur has some ancient temples. Gangakhed is known for its river and is the birthplace of Sant Janabai.

Turabul Haq Dargah (Turatpir) is located in Parbhani Town. The Dargah consists of the tomb of Turabul Haq Shah, a Muslim saint who lived here during the last days of his life. The Dargah is famous for annual Urs, the death anniversary. Urs is an important festival where people of all religions come together and celebrate for a week (usually start from 2 to 15 February). Dargah of Qurban Ali shah, dargah of Akhund Shah and dargah of many other saints are also situated in the city.

Churches in Parbhani Include Christ Gospel Church, Church of the Nazarene, Good News Church, and New Apostolic Church.

== Healthcare ==
=== Private hospitals ===
Essential basic needs of healthcare are present, as well as high-end facilities. A number of intensive care units and four multi super specialty hospitals are operational as of January 2024.

=== Government hospitals ===
The city has District Civil Hospital with 412 beds. City has Government Eye Hospital as well. It also has a separate Government Hospital for Women.

Parbhani Civil Hospital carries out government operations such as Beti Bachao, Beti Padhao Yojana, National Rural Health Mission for school going kids, and National Program for Prevention and Control of Diabetes, Cardio-Vascular Diseases, Cancer and Stroke. It also has a department to prevent and take action against swine flu. Through its workshops of Adolescent Reproductive & Sexual Health the Civil Hospital tries to spread awareness against underage marriages and teen pregnancy. Along with these, the Civil Hospital carries out its traditional duties of spreading awareness of basic hygiene, healthcare, and vaccinations. Civil hospital does not charge any individual for acquiring condoms, and other contraceptives. It also provides most medicines for free. The Civil Hospital charges a nominal fees for its services like surgeries.

== Transport ==
=== Rail ===
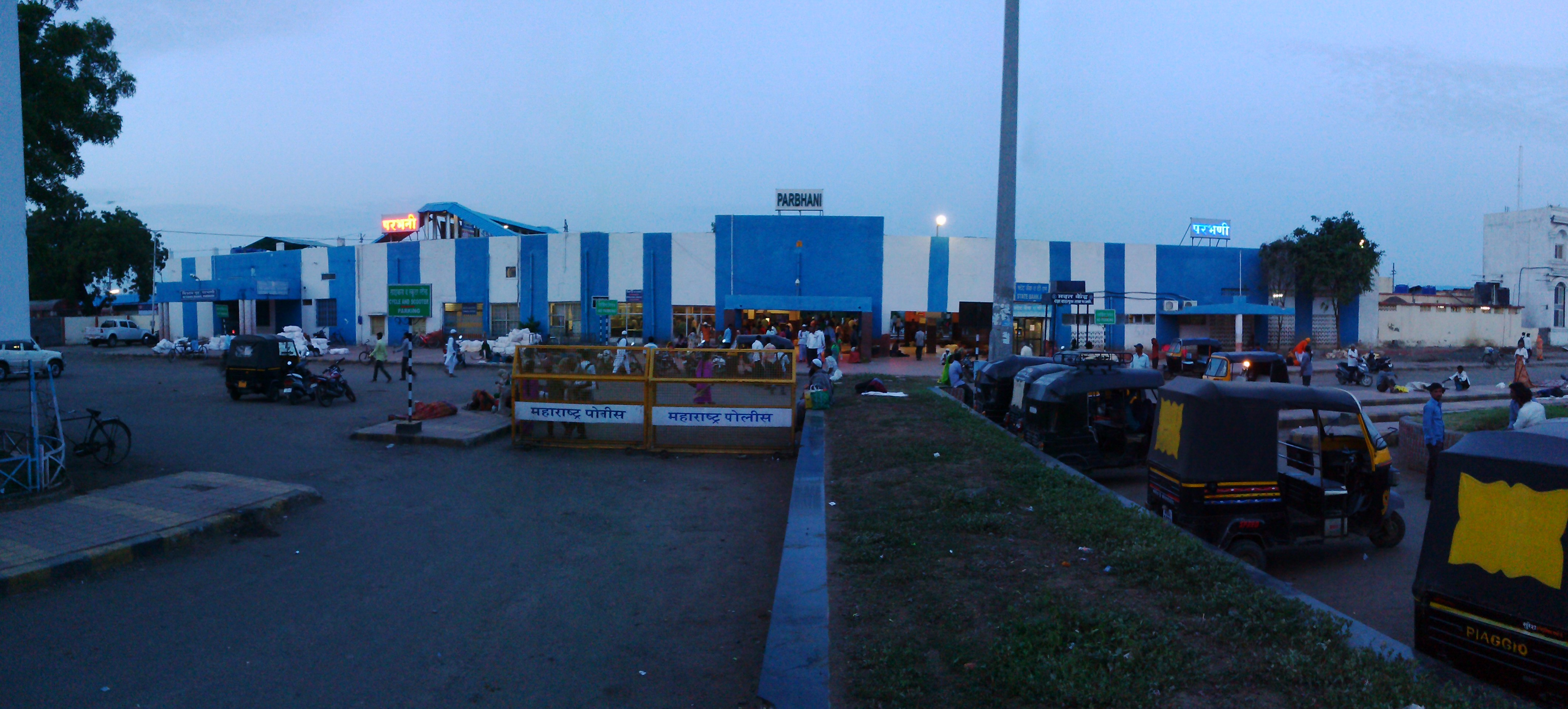
Panoramic photo of Parbhani railway station at dawn

The transport system of the city is largely dependent on rails. Parbhani railway station is a railway junction situated on Secunderabad–Manmad section of South Central Railway zone. The town has connectivity to major cities of Maharashtra, such as Mumbai, Pune, Nagpur, Nanded, Aurangabad, Nashik and Kolhapur. It is also connected to other Indian cities like New Delhi, Bangalore (Bengaluru), Hyderabad, Chennai, Ajmer, Bhopal, Amritsar, Allahabad (Prayagraj), Rameshwaram, Tirupati and Visakhapatnam. Parbhani Junction has many facilities, such as baggage check, metal detectors, VIP Lounge, parking, ATMs, ATVM (automatic ticket vending machines), canteen (Rail Aahar), fruit stalls, book stalls, Indian Post (Bhartiya Daak), foot overbridges, water for passengers, milk dairy, television, and wifi network (54 Mbit/s).

=== Bus ===
Central Bus Station of Parbhani connects Parbhani to other states of India, such as Andhra Pradesh, Telangana, Karnataka, Gujarat and Madhya Pradesh. There are multiple daily buses of private operators and MSRTC Parbhani Division between Parbhani to other metropolitan cities within Maharashtra, and although at less frequency, there are buses to metropolitan cities from other states mentioned above.

Parbhani Bus Port is under construction in CBS Parbhani.

=== Roads ===
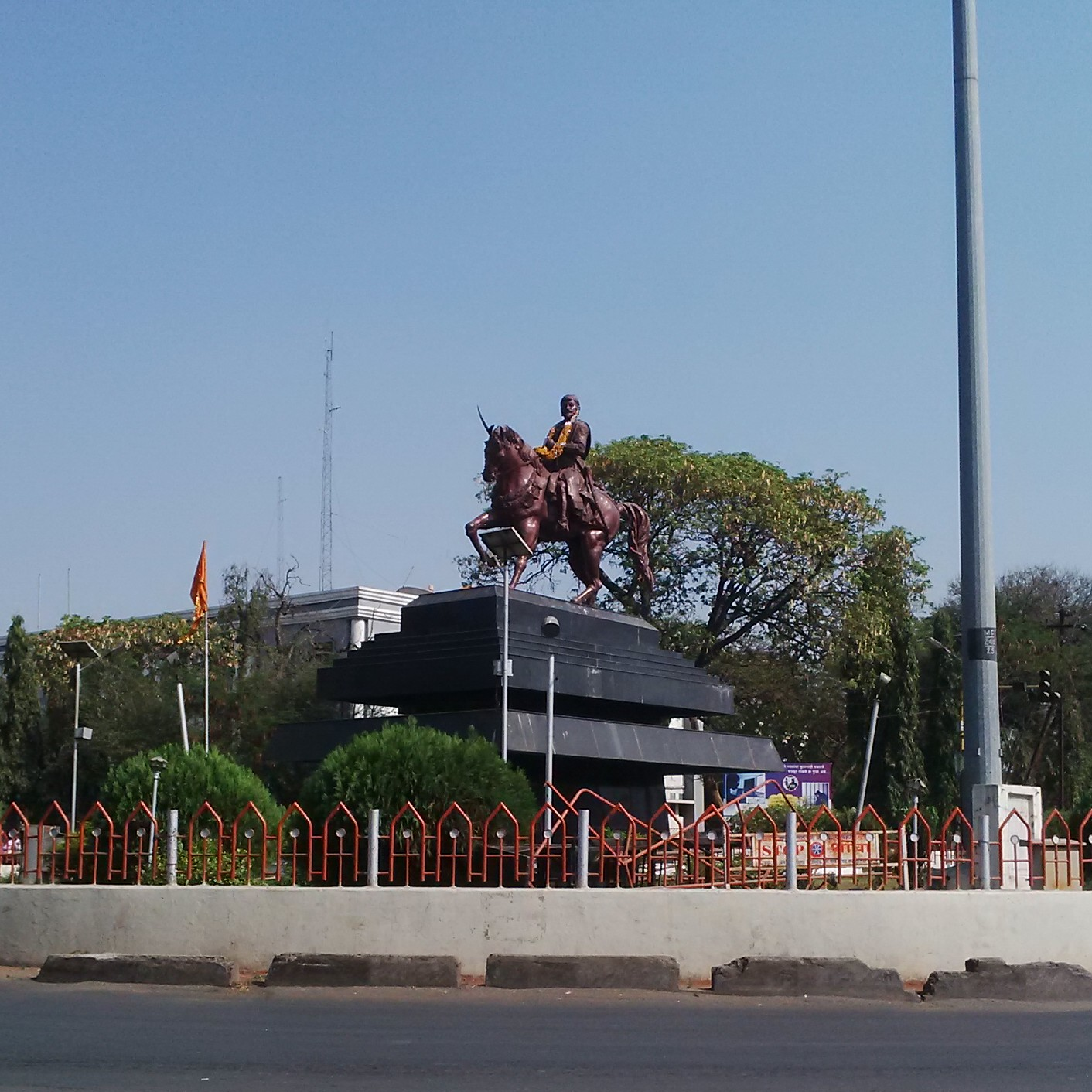
Roundabout at great Chattrapati Shivaji Maharaj Statue on National Highway

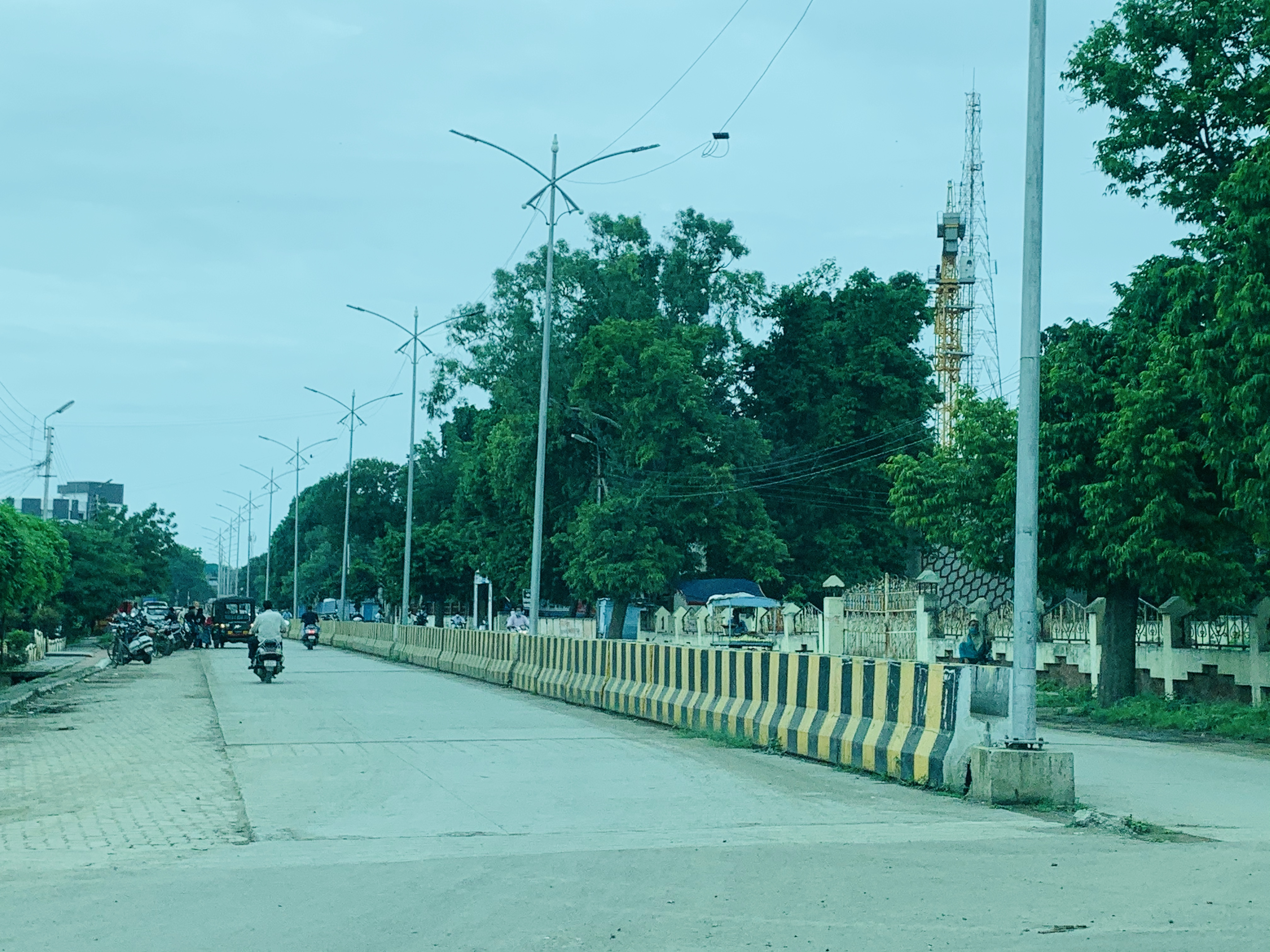
Newly constructed stadium road

National Highway 61 old numbering NH 222, which connects the states Telangana and Maharashtra, passes through the town, which makes it have connectivity to Mumbai, Nanded. The NH 61 paves its way into National Highway 3 at Kalyan. These highways open further connectivity options for Parbhani, making it to connect with north-eastern cities of Indore, Jhansi, Agra and North-Southern cities like Varanasi, Nagpur, Adilabad, Nizamabad, Hyderabad, Bangalore and Kanyakumari.

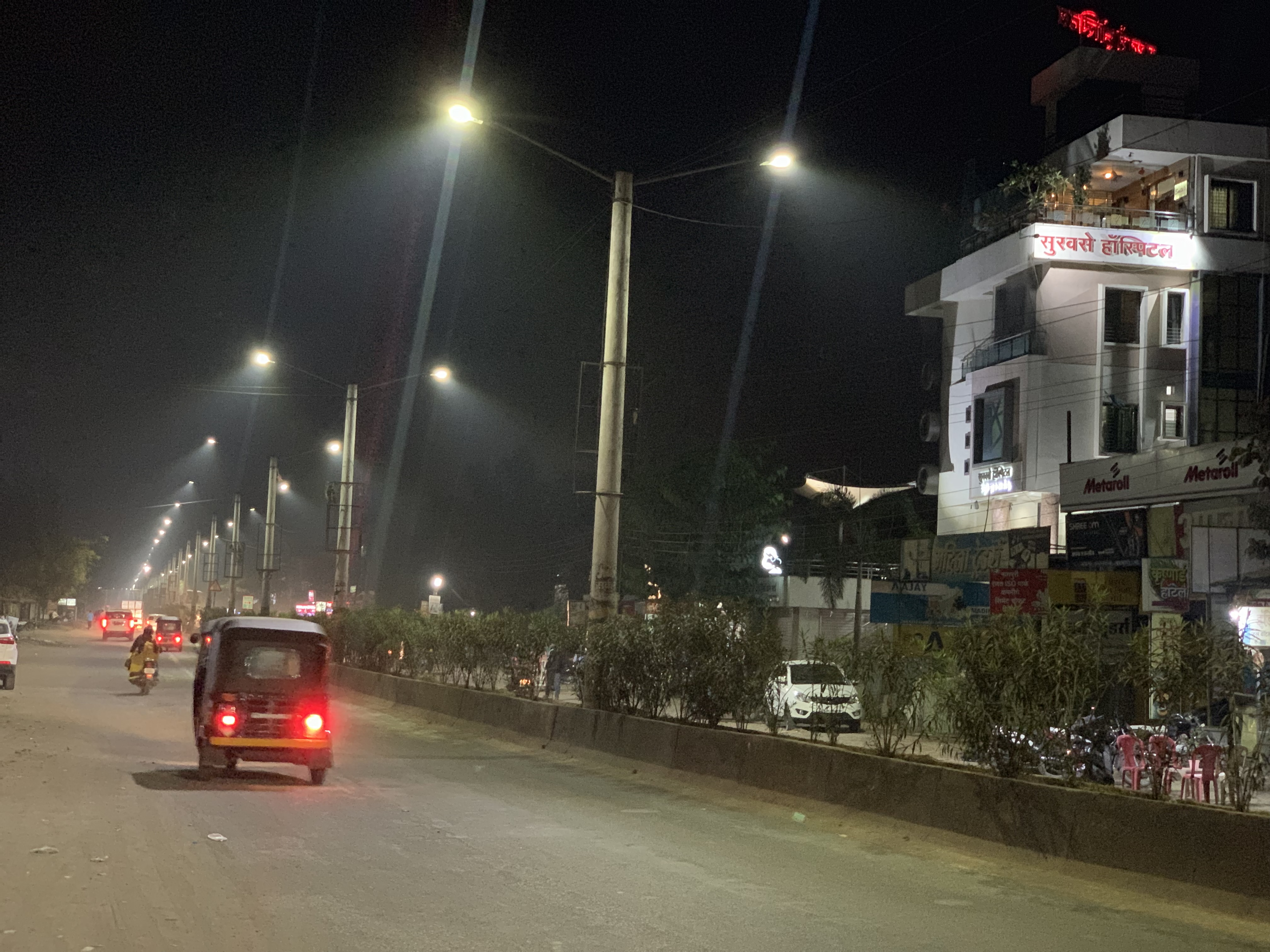
Parbhani roads

=== Air ===
On 31 December 1998, the State Government approved to construct an airport in Parbhani. Which was later stalled on 1 November 2001. This project is currently shelved. The location for the airport was never decided.

== Economy ==
The economy of Parbhani largely depends on agriculture and agribusiness. It has Maharashtra Industrial Development Corporation area for development of industries in the region, but does not have any major industry. It is one of the most backward districts of India and thus have very low per capita income. The city is considered as forsaken as there have been lack of any initiatives by the state and central governments. It also holds the record for having highest fuel prices in the country, which add further backwardness.

Parbhani is famous for its cotton produce. Parbhani exports its agriculture products like vegetable and fruits on a large scale.

== Media ==
Parbhani's All India Radio (Ākāshvāṇī) radio station was commissioned and became operational in 1968. With four studios, it produces programmes in Marathi, Hindi, English, Urdu and Sanskrit languages. It also provides dubbing services. The transmission covers Parbhani, Nanded, Hingoli, Latur, Jalna, Beed and Osmanabad districts, resulting an audience of approximately 10 lakhs. The frequency of transmission is 1305 kHz (MW). Parbhani also has Doordarshan Relay Centre.

All the major newspapers and electronic news media channels have their offices or representatives in the city.

== Sports ==
Many sports establishments are available in Parbhani, such as football, swimming pool, tennis, badminton courts, cricket club, basketball club, baseball club. These clubs are operated by PMC's Department of Sports.

Furthermore, Parbhani has a multi-purpose stadium, the "District Stadium". It is owned by PMC and operated by Department of Sports.

== Governance ==
In 2011 Maharashtra State cabinet decided to elevate Parbhani along with Latur and Chandrapur to municipal corporation as city crossed mark of 3,00,000 population in 2011 census. First election for the Municipal Corporation was conducted in 2012, after the predecessor City Council's term ended.

"Parbhani Lok Sabha constituency" is one of the 48 Lok Sabha (parliamentary) constituencies in Maharashtra state in western India. This constituency covers the entire Parbhani district and a part of Jalna district.

Since 1989, Parbhani is stronghold of Shiv Sena both in Maharashtra Legislative Assembly elections and in Lok Sabha elections for Indian Parliament.

== Notable people ==
- Sheshrao Deshmukh
- Shivajirao Shankarrao Deshmukh
- Babajani Durrani
- Mohan Fad
- Sanjay Haribhau Jadhav
- Suresh Jadhav
- Abdul Rahman Khan Yousuf Khan
- Fouzia Khan
- Irfan ur Rahman Khan
- Rahul Vedprakash Patil
- Tukaram Renge Patil
- Mukundrao Pedgaonkar
- Mira Renge
- V. Satish
- Tryambak Vasekar
- Meena Warpudkar
- Suresh Warpudkar
- Ramrao Narayanrao Yadav

== Gallery ==
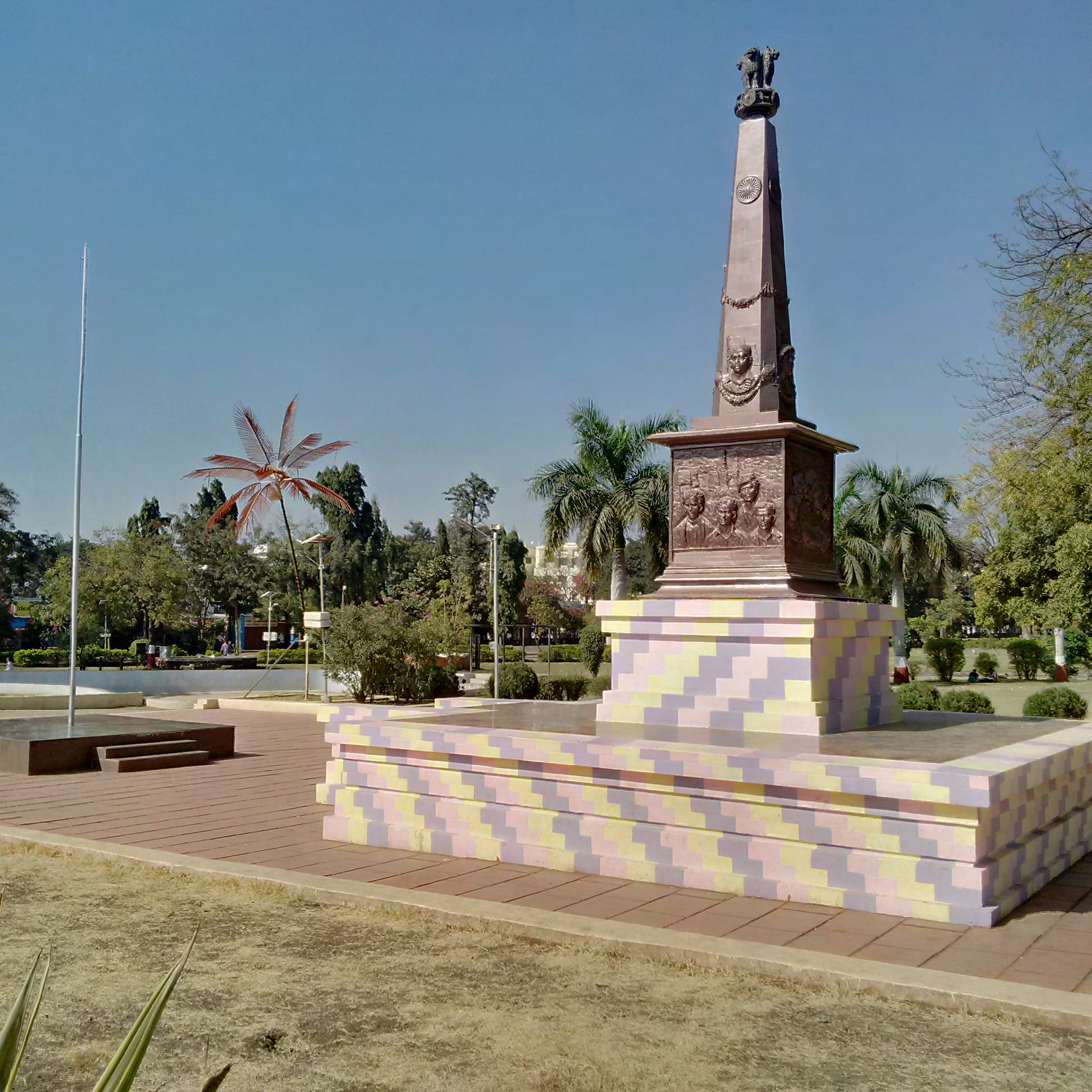
Cross view of the monument, with flag pole in front

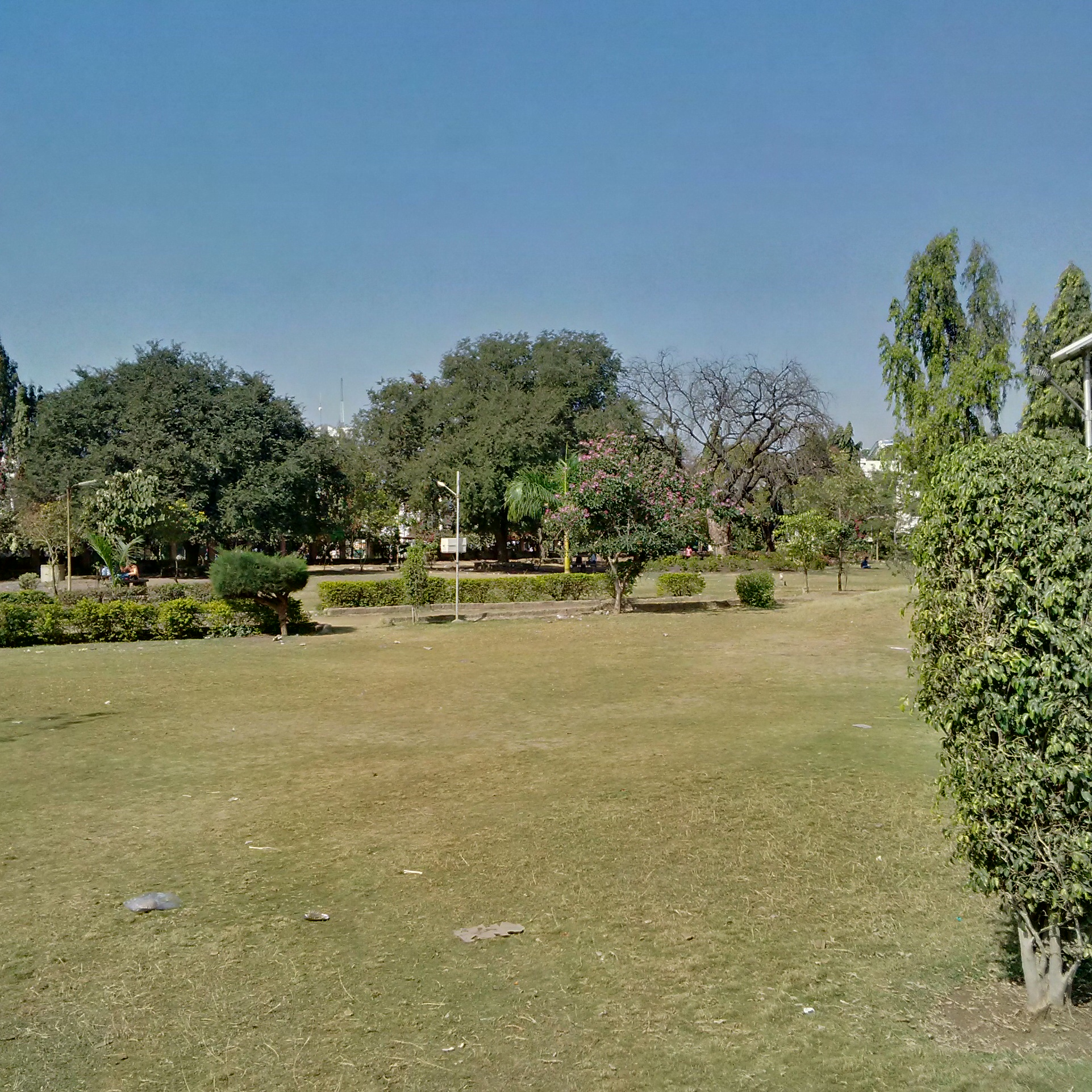
View of the park

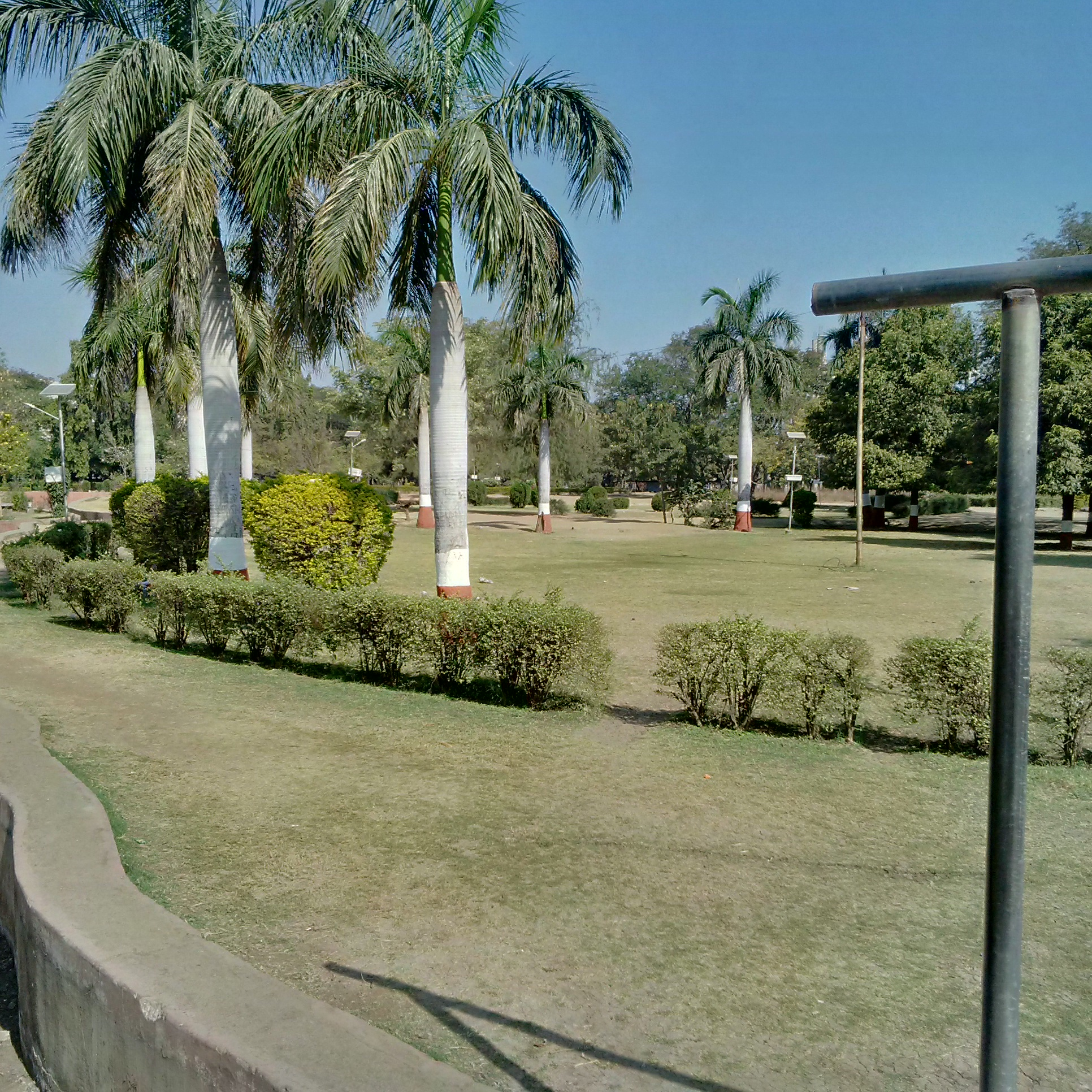
Palm trees in the park

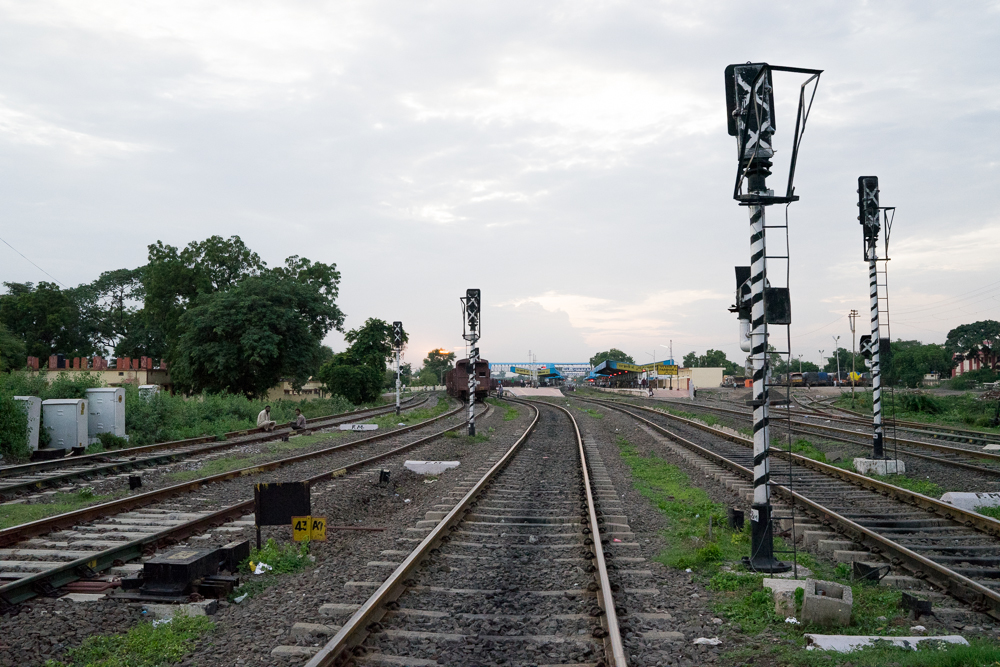
Railway tracks of Parbhani station

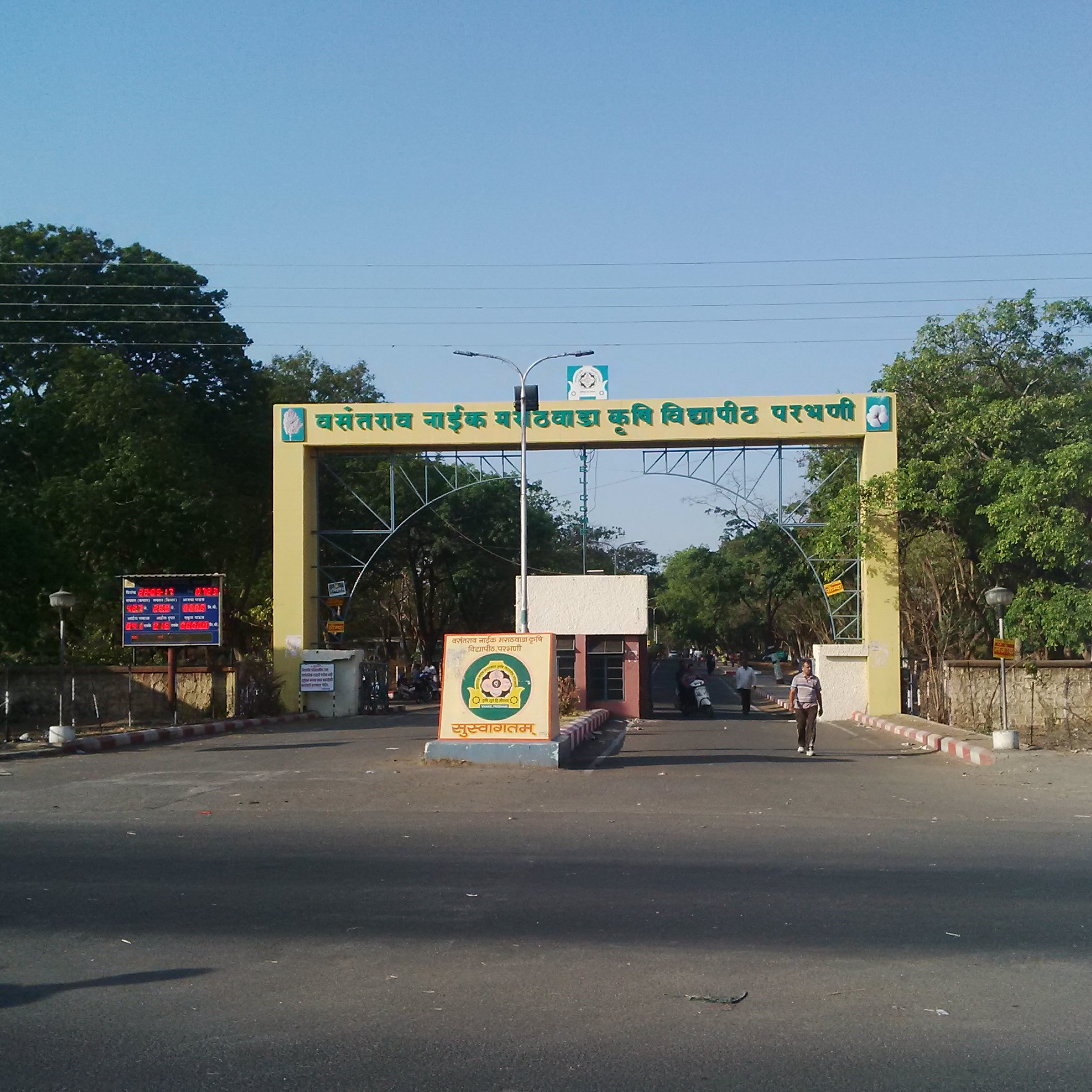

== See also ==
- Parbhani (Vidhan Sabha constituency)
