= Parbhani district =

- District of Maharashtra
- Parbhavati Nagar district
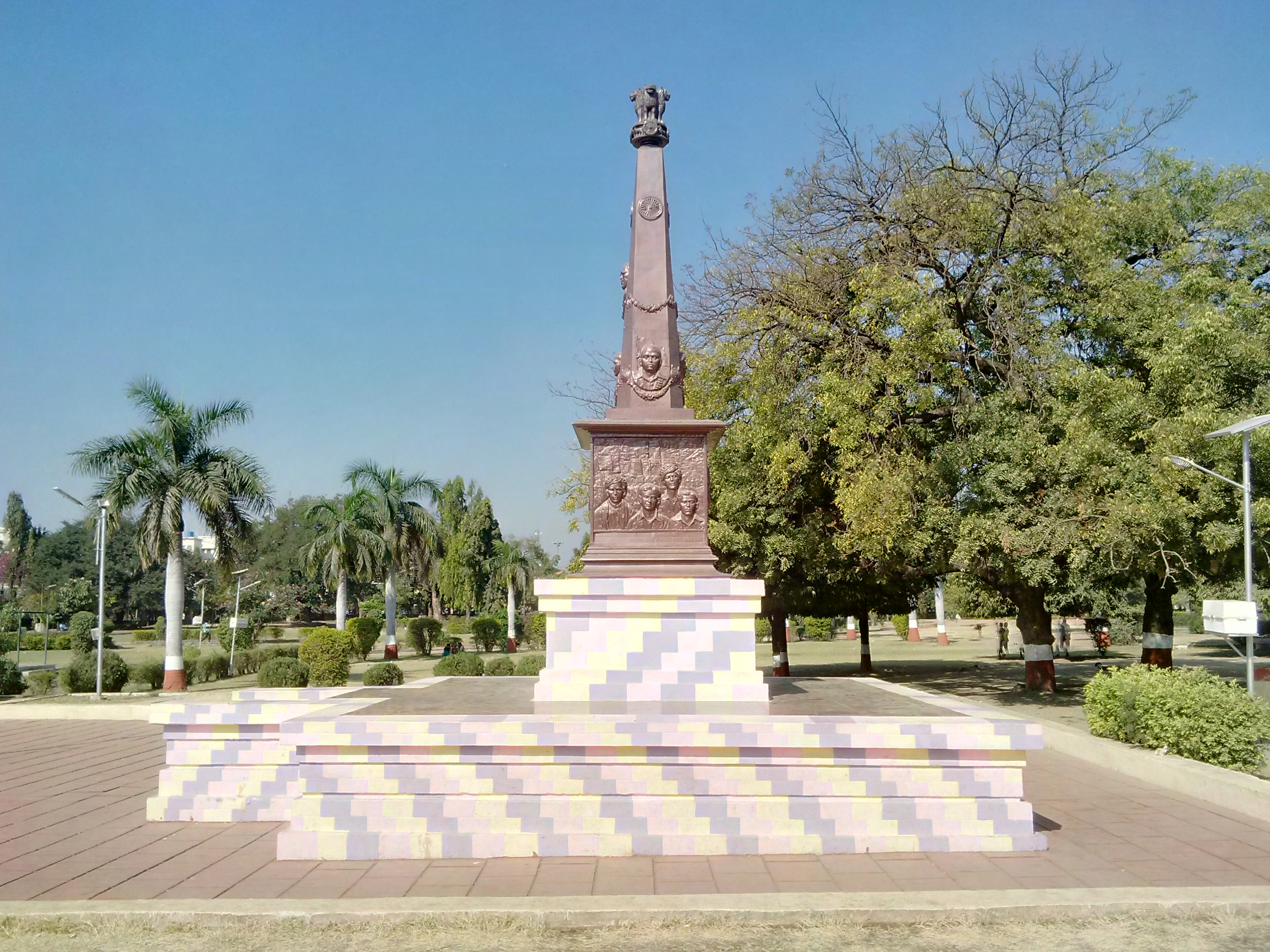
- Memorial to freedom fighters from Marathwada in Parbhani city
- Nickname: Land of saints
- Location in Maharashtra
- Parbhani district
- Coordinates (Parbhani): 19°30′N 76°45′E
- Country: India
- State: Maharashtra
- Division: Aurangabad
- Headquarters: Parbhani
- Tehsils: 1. Parbhani, 2. Gangakhed, 3. Sonpeth, 4. Pathri, 5. Manwath, 6. Palam, 7. Sailu, 8. Jintur, 9. Purna

Government
  - Body: Parbhani Zilla Parishad
  - Guardian Minister: Meghana Bordikar (State Minister)
  - President Z. P. Parbhani: NA
  - District Collector: Mr. Sanjay Chavan IAS
  - CEO Z. P. Parbhani: NA
  - MPs: Sanjay Haribhau Jadhav (Parbhani)

Area
  - Total: 6,251 km^{2} (2,414 sq mi)

Population (2011)
  - Total: 1,636,086
  - Density: 261.7/km^{2} (677.9/sq mi)
- Demonym: Parbhanikar

Demographics
  - Literacy: 75.22%
  - Sex ratio: 940
- Time zone: UTC+05:30 (IST)
- Major highways: NH 61
- Website: parbhani.nic.in

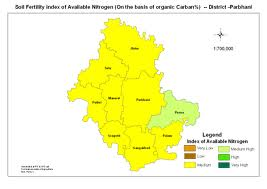
Talukas in Parbhani district

Parbhani district (Marathi pronunciation: [pəɾbʰəɳiː]) is one of the eight districts in the Marathawada region of Maharashtra state of India. Parbhani city is the headquarters of this district. The district is well known for the Marathwada rebellion and religious tourism(Hinduism, Jainism).

== Members of Parliament ==
Sanjay Haribhau Jadhav (Shiv Sena) (Parbhani)

== Members of Legislative assembly ==
- Meghana Bordikar (BJP) (Jintur)
- Rahul Patil (SHS(UBT)) (Parbhani)
- Ratnakar Gutte (RSP) (Gangakhed)
- Rajesh Vitekar (NCP) (Pathri)

== Guardian Minister ==
Guardian Minister Parbhani
- पालकमंत्री परभणी
- Emblem of India
- Incumbent; Sanjay Bansode; Cabinet Minister since 04 October 2023
- Style: The Honourable
- Residence: Parbhani
- Appointer: Chief Minister of Maharashtra
- Term length: 5 years / No time limit
- Website: parbhani.gov.in/en/

=== list of Guardian Minister ===
Name	Term of office
Diwakar Raote; Cabinet Minister	31 October 2014 - 8 November 2019
Nawab Malik; Cabinet Minister	9 January 2020 - 27 March 2022
Dhananjay Munde; Cabinet Minister; Additional Charge	27 March 2022 - 29 June 2022
Tanaji Sawant; Cabinet Minister	24 September 2022 - 4 October 2023
Sanjay Bansode; Cabinet Minister	4 October 2023 - Incumbent

== District Magistrate/Collector ==
District Magistrate / Collector Parbhani
- जिल्हाधिकारी तथा जिल्हदंडाधिकरी परभणी
- Emblem of India
- Incumbent; Mr. Raghunath Gawade (IAS) since 2023
- Residence: At Parbhani District
- Appointer: Government of Maharashtra
- Term length: No time limit
- Website: parbhani.gov.in/en/

=== list of District Magistrate / Collector ===
Name	Term of office
Mr Raghunath Gawade (IAS)	2023 - Incumbent

== History ==
From 1596 to 1724, major part of the present territory of the district was divided between Pathri and Washim sarkars of Berar Subah of the Mughal Empire. In 1724, after the battle of Sakharkheda, it went under the Nizam's rule. Following the re-organization of the states in 1956, Parbhani along with the other districts of Marathwada became part of Bombay State. On 1 May 1960 when Maharashtra state was formed, it became a part of it.

== Geography ==
Parbhani district lies between 18.45 and 20.10 North Latitudes and 76.13 and 77.39 East Longitude. The district is bounded on the north by Hingoli and Buldhana districts. On the east by Nanded and Hingoli, on the South by Latur and on the West by Beed and Jalna districts.

The hills on the north east form part of the Ajanta Hill ranges which passes through Jintur Tahsil. The hills on the southern side are the Balaghat Hill ranges. The district is at an average height of 357 m from mean sea level.

=== Climate ===
Parbhani's climate is classified as tropical. The Köppen-Geiger climate classification is Aw. When compared with winter, the summers have much more rainfall.

Climate data for Parbhani (1961–1990)
Month	Jan	Feb	Mar	Apr	May	Jun	Jul	Aug	Sep	Oct	Nov	Dec	Year
Record high °C (°F)	36.0 (96.8)	38.2 (100.8)	41.1 (106.0)	44.5 (112.1)	45.0 (113.0)	44.2 (111.6)	38.1 (100.6)	35.0 (95.0)	36.1 (97.0)	36.1 (97.0)	35.0 (95.0)	34.0 (93.2)	38.4 (101.1)
Mean daily maximum °C (°F)	28.0 (82.4)	32.0 (89.6)	35.6 (96.1)	38.4 (101.1)	39.6 (103.3)	33.0 (91.4)	30.1 (86.2)	29.4 (84.9)	30.7 (87.3)	31.6 (88.9)	30.0 (86.0)	28.0 (82.4)	32.3 (90.1)
Mean daily minimum °C (°F)	11.8 (53.2)	14.9 (58.8)	18.7 (65.7)	22.3 (72.1)	24.6 (76.3)	24.0 (75.2)	22.8 (73.0)	22.2 (72.0)	21.8 (71.2)	19.0 (66.2)	14.7 (58.5)	11.5 (52.7)	18.9 (66.0)
Record low °C (°F)	3.0 (37.4)	5.9 (42.6)	9.6 (49.3)	14.8 (58.6)	17.1 (62.8)	18.2 (64.8)	17.9 (64.2)	18.1 (64.6)	15.0 (59.0)	9.1 (48.4)	6.8 (44.2)	2.7 (36.9)	2.7 (36.9)
Average precipitation mm (inches)	5.7 (0.22)	4.6 (0.18)	12.5 (0.49)	7.0 (0.28)	19.2 (0.76)	157.8 (6.21)	238.4 (9.39)	265.4 (10.45)	184.9 (7.28)	74.6 (2.94)	13.8 (0.54)	12.5 (0.49)	996.4 (39.23)
Average rainy days	0.4	0.4	0.8	0.8	1.8	8.8	10.8	11.2	8.9	3.2	0.8	0.7	48.6
Source: India Meteorological Department (record high and low up to 2010)

This entire Marathwada region, a district geographical region, was a part of Hyderabad State. After reorganization of states in 1956 it became a part of the then Bombay state and from 1960 onwards it is part of the present Maharashtra state.

The state capital of Mumbai is to the west; Parbhani is well connected by road to other major towns in Maharashtra and also in the neighboring state of Telangana. Parbhani is a major railway junction connecting Telangana with Marathwada.

In the northeast, on the boundary of Parbhani and Hingoli districts there is extension of Ajanta ranges called Nirmal Hills. The main river in the district is Godavari River, other rivers are Purna and Dudhana which are tributaries of Godavari. Major dams in Parbhani district are Yeldari dam which is on Purna River, Lower Dudhana dam is on Dudhana river, Mudgal barrage on Godavari River, Masoli Dam on Masoli River, and Karpara Dam on Karpara River.

== Administrative Divisions ==
Parbhani district covers an area of about 6250.58 km^{2}. The district is divided into 9 administrative Sub-units (Tehsils), namely, Parbhani, Gangakhed, Sonpeth, Pathri, Manwath, Palam, Selu, Jintur, and Purna.

== Demographics ==
Historical population
Year	Pop.	±% p.a.
1901	353,265	—
1911	425,672	+1.88%
1921	418,191	−0.18%
1931	466,278	+1.09%
1941	498,103	+0.66%
1951	550,621	+1.01%
1961	641,081	+1.53%
1971	805,383	+2.31%
1981	987,411	+2.06%
1991	1,293,104	+2.73%
2001	1,527,715	+1.68%
2011	1,836,086	+1.86%

According to the 2011 census Parbhani district has a population of 1,836,086, roughly equal to the nation of Kosovo or the US state of Nebraska. This gives it a ranking of 259th in India (out of a total of 640). The district has a population density of 295 inhabitants per square kilometre (760/sq mi) . Its population growth rate over the decade 2001-2011 was 20.18%. Parbhani has a sex ratio of 940 females for every 1000 males, and a literacy rate of 75.22%. 31.03% of the population live in urban areas. Scheduled Castes and Scheduled Tribes make up 13.47% and 2.21% of the population respectively.

=== Religion ===
Religions in Parbhani district (2011)
Religion	Percent
Hinduism	72.35%
Islam	16.69%
Buddhism	10.23%
Other or not stated	0.73%

Hindus and Buddhists make up the majority of the population, both concentrated in rural areas. Ministry of Minority Affairs declared Parbhani as Minority Concentration District as Muslims makes 15.97% of the population. Muslims are concentrated in urban areas and make up the majority in Jintur and Pathri.

=== Languages ===
Languages in Parbhani district (2011)
1. Marathi (78.3%)
2. Urdu (12.0%)
3. Hindi (4.99%)
4. Lambadi (3.06%)
5. Others (1.63%)

At the time of the 2011 Census of India, 78.35% of the population in the district spoke Marathi, 11.97% Urdu, 4.99% Hindi and 3.06% Lambadi as their first language.

Languages used mostly in the district include Marathi, Dakkhani (Deccan) Urdu, Andh, Lambadi and Hindi.

== Land of saints ==
Parbhani has been described as the land of saints, as several saints have been associated with Parbhani including Janabai from Gangakhed. The famous mathematician Bhaskarbhatt was from Bori in Parbhani district.

Nemgiri (sequence of caves) related to Jainism, is situated in Jintur town of the district.

Sri Sai Janmasthan Temple (Sai Baba Birth Temple) is a temple in heart of the Pathri town, where spiritual master Sai Baba of Shirdi was born.

Selu town was home to Guru of Shri Sai Baba "Shri Babasaheb Maharaj". Sai Baba stayed with him for 12 years during which time he acquired knowledge from his Guru.

Turabul Haq Dargah, the tomb of the eponymous Muslim saint is located in Parbhani city.

== Mudgaleshwar ==
It is located on the bank of the Godavari river. A temple is in the midst of the river. The temple in the middle of the river flow and is more than nine hundred years old and same is written on stone script at the entrance. Temple on river bank and old ghat was built by "Ahilya Bai" 250 years back. Lord "Narasimha Swamy" has taken the form "Shivalinga" along with his wife "Mahalaxmi" and son "Moudgalya" and daughter-in-law "Jaabalabai". During rainy season the temple gets immersed in water. To have darshan one has to swim to the temple. Best time to visit is summer season i.e. from April to June. To reach the place one has to travel by train via "Parbhani" or "Parli Vaidyanath".

The temple used to be managed by Shri Sahebrao Mudgalkar and Shri Subhashrao Mudgalkar. The Shivaratri is celebrated here every year. All type of pujas are performed here. Nagbali and Sukhshanti pujas are very famous.

The new dam is constructed on the river. Recently a Dattatriya temple is constructed and murthy staphana is completed on 26 December 2012.

== See also ==
- Make in Maharashtra
- Turabul Haq Dargah, Parbhani
- Marathwada
