= 1985 Maharashtra Legislative Assembly election =

State assembly election in India

1985 Maharashtra Legislative Assembly Elections
- 2, 5 March 1985
- Turnout: 59.17% (▲5.87%)
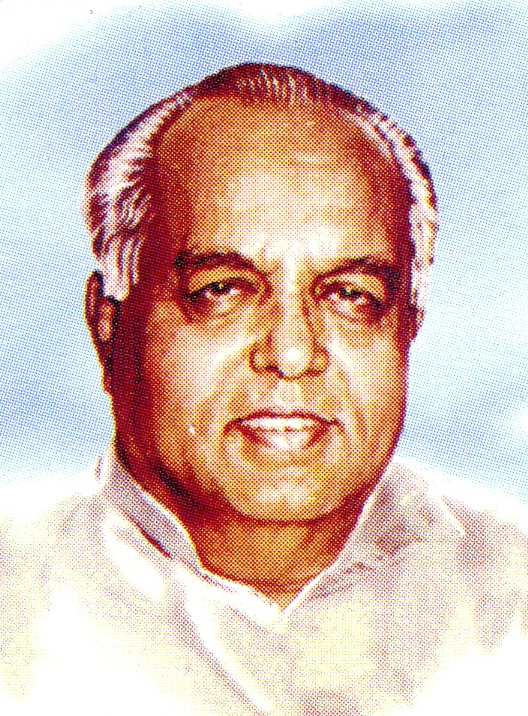

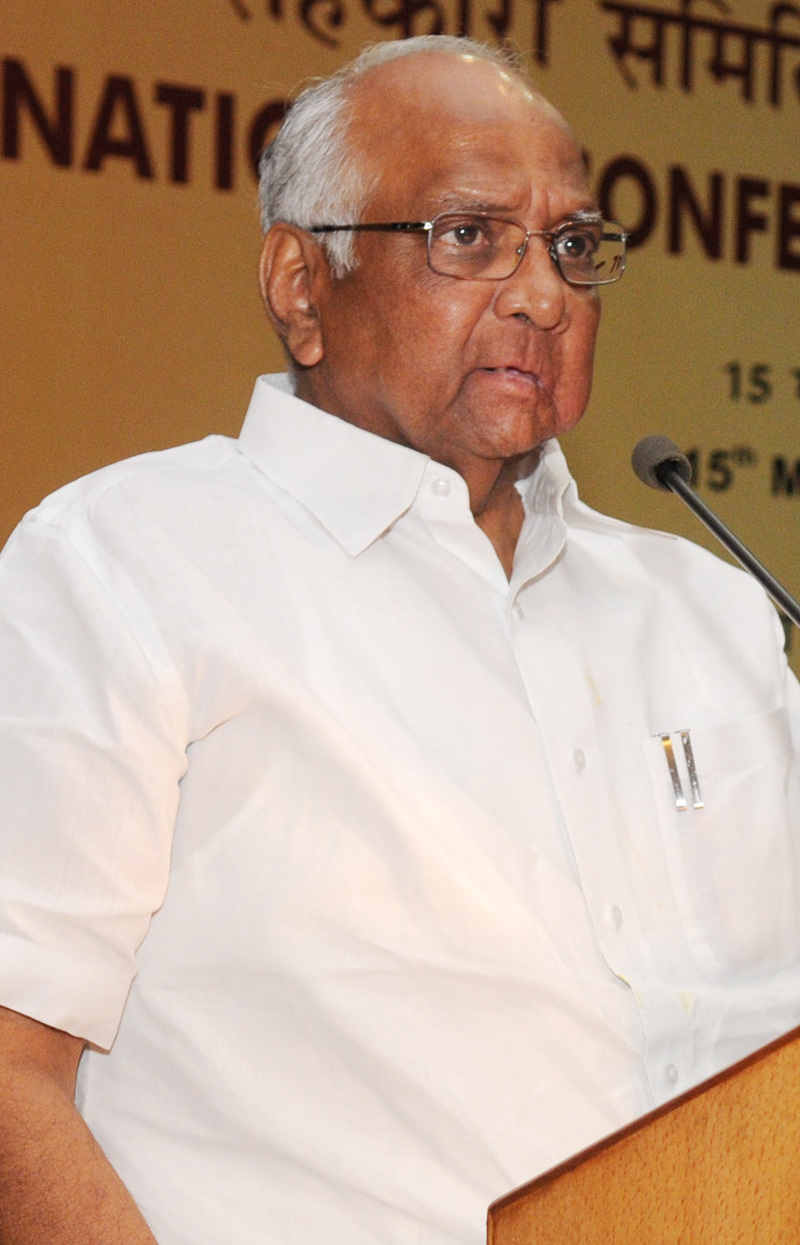
	Majority party	Minority party
Leader	Vasantdada Patil	Sharad Pawar
Party	INC	IC(S)
Leader's seat	Sangli Assembly constituency	Baramati
Seats before	186	New Party
Seats won	161	54
Seat change	▼25	▲54
	Third party	Fourth party
	JP	BJP
Party	JP	BJP
Seats before	17	14
Seats won	20	16
Seat change	▲3	▲2
Chief Minister before election
Vasantdada Patil
INC
Elected Chief Minister
Shivajirao Patil Nilangekar
INC

The 1985 Maharashtra State Assembly election was held in March 1985. A total of 288 seats were contested.

== List of participating political parties ==
Party	Abbreviation
National Parties
Bharatiya Janata Party	BJP
Indian National Congress	INC
Indian Congress (Socialist)	IC(S)
Janata Party	JP
Lok Dal	LKD
Communist Party of India (Marxist)	CPM
Communist Party of India	CPI
State Parties
Peasants and Workers Party	PWP
All India Forward Bloc	AIFB
Registered (Unrecognised) Parties
Republican Party of India	RPI
Republican Party of India (Khobragade)	RPI(K)

== Results ==
The Indian National Congress won the majority of seats. Shivajirao Patil Nilangekar became Chief Minister. Shankarrao Chimaji Jagatap became Speaker. Sharad Pawar became leader of the opposition.

=== Party results ===
Summary of results of the Maharashtra State Assembly election, 1985
Political Party	No. of candidates	No. of elected	Seat change	Number of Votes	% of Votes	Change in vote %
Indian National Congress 161 / 288 (56%)	287	161	▼25 (from INC(I) seats)	9,522,556	43.41%	▼1.09% (from INC(I) vote share)
Indian Congress (Socialist) 54 / 288 (19%)	126	54	▲7 (from INC(U) seats)	3,790,850	17.28%	▼3.21% (from INC(U) vote share)
Janata Party 20 / 288 (7%)	61	20	▲3	1,618,101	7.38%	▲1.23%
Bharatiya Janata Party 16 / 288 (6%)	67	16	▲2	1,590,351	7.25%	▼2.13%
Peasants and Workers Party of India 13 / 288 (5%)	29	13	▲4	825,949	3.77%	▼0.37%
Communist Party of India 2 / 288 (0.7%)	31	2	Steady	202,790	0.92%	▼0.39%
Communist Party of India (Marxist) 2 / 288 (0.7%)	14	2	Steady	174,350	0.79%	▼0.14%
Republican Party of India	54	0	Steady	220,230	1.00%	▲0.24%
Republican Party of India (Khobragade)	16	0	▼1	113,632	0.52%	▼0.84%
Independents 20 / 288 (7%)	1506	20	▲10	3,836,390	17.49%	▲9.46%
Total	2230	288	Steady	21,934,742	59.17%	▲5.87%

=== Regional results ===
Region	Total seats	Indian National Congress	Indian Congress (Socialist)	Bharatiya Janata Party	Janata Party	Others
Western Maharashtra	70	22	31	5	1	1
Vidarbha	62	51	4	7		
Marathwada	46	33	10	2		
Thane+Konkan	39	18	2	1		
Mumbai	36	15	1	1		
North Maharashtra	35	22	6	3		
Total	288	161	54	20	16	

=== Results by constituency ===
Winner, runner-up, voter turnout, and victory margin in every constituency
Assembly Constituency		Turnout	Winner				Runner Up				Margin
#k	Names	%	Candidate	Party	Votes	%	Candidate	Party	Votes	%	Margin
1	Sawantwadi	51.31%	Shivram Sawant Khem Sawant Bhonsale	INC	25,135	44.61%	Jayanand Mathkar	JP	21,617	38.37%	3,518
2	Vengurla	59.74%	Pushpasen Sawant	JP	24,766	40.34%	Sharad Palav	INC	21,338	34.76%	3,428
3	Malvan	54.37%	Prabhugaokar Bapusahed	INC	25,598	47.47%	Baban D'Souza	JP	21,665	40.18%	3,933
4	Deogad	60.97%	Appa Gogate	BJP	21,386	37.75%	R. R. Loke	INC	14,085	24.86%	7,301
5	Rajapur	59.34%	Hatankar Laxman Rangnath	INC	32,726	52.00%	Bhikajirao Chavan	JP	23,977	38.10%	8,749
6	Ratnagiri	51.80%	Shivajirao Jadyar	INC	30,518	50.15%	Gotad Shivajirao Ramchandra	BJP	19,252	31.63%	11,266
7	Sangameshwar	55.55%	Musa Alli Modak	INC	27,282	45.84%	Jagannath Jadhav	JP	25,119	42.20%	2,163
8	Guhagar	59.79%	Shridhar Dattatray Natu	BJP	30,338	46.86%	Ghanekar Dhaku Bhagoji	Independent	21,245	32.82%	9,093
9	Chiplun	61.52%	Joshi Nishikani Madhao	INC	30,300	52.90%	Vasantrao Balwantrao Shinde	Independent	11,565	20.19%	18,735
10	Khed	64.85%	Kadam Tukaram Baburao	INC	35,655	55.77%	Kehsvrao Jagatrao Bhosale	Independent	20,732	32.43%	14,923
11	Dapoli	59.03%	Chandrakant Mokal	INC	22,478	34.87%	G. D. Sakpal	JP	20,795	32.26%	1,683
12	Mahad	69.12%	Shantaram Philse	JP	32,040	44.48%	Sudhakar Shankar Sawant	INC	31,391	43.58%	649
13	Shrivardhan	60.89%	A. R. Antulay	Independent	46,465	63.70%	Katkar Ganpat Sakharam	JP	14,984	20.54%	31,481
14	Mangaon	60.32%	Nilkanth Janardhan Sawant	PWPI	33,445	49.26%	Sunil Dattatray Tatkare	INC	28,013	41.26%	5,432
15	Pen	61.26%	Mohan Mahadeo Patil	PWPI	40,347	55.49%	Namdeo Yeso Khaire	INC	30,513	41.96%	9,834
16	Alibag	63.10%	Datta Narayan Patil	PWPI	54,368	71.08%	A. G. (Ravi) Patil	INC	22,116	28.92%	32,252
17	Panvel	54.78%	Dattatraya Narayan Patil	PWPI	37,740	55.02%	Gajanan Narayan Patil	INC	14,663	21.38%	23,077
18	Khalapur	52.32%	Raut Sumant Rajaram	PWPI	20,594	30.58%	Aftab Shaikh Mohammed	INC	17,955	26.67%	2,639
19	Colaba	32.96%	Patrawala Marazban Jal	INC	20,836	60.58%	Sharad Rao	JP	10,489	30.50%	10,347
20	Umarkhadi	34.54%	Chandrika P. Kenia	INC	18,176	44.75%	Chorwadwalla Abdul Kader Ibrahim	Independent	12,244	30.15%	5,932
21	Mumbadevi	34.51%	Kapadia Lalit Jamnadas	INC	22,910	62.09%	Nanubhai C. Patel	BJP	12,676	34.35%	10,234
22	Khetwadi	43.50%	Premkumar Shankardatt Sharma	BJP	19,354	41.99%	Qureshi M. Ismail Abdul Karim	INC	19,267	41.80%	87
23	Opera House	48.68%	Chandrashekhar Prabhu	INC	22,934	45.98%	Gajanan Damodar Vartak	Independent	13,850	27.77%	9,084
24	Malabar Hill	35.80%	Balvantray Ambelal Desai	INC	33,574	66.16%	Bane Manohar V.	IC(S)	15,872	31.28%	17,702
25	Chinchpokli	45.43%	Annasaheb Alias B. D. Zute	INC	21,086	43.27%	Jariwala Abdul Sattar Abdul Majid	Independent	11,948	24.52%	9,138
26	Nagpada	42.64%	Dr. Syed Ahmed (politician)	INC	20,081	48.64%	Dr. Ishaq Jamkhanawala Abedin	IC(S)	11,695	28.33%	8,386
27	Mazgaon	54.57%	Chhagan Bhujbal	Independent	18,510	29.64%	T. S. Borade	Independent	17,307	27.71%	1,203
28	Parel	58.52%	Sharad Khatu	Independent	22,613	29.65%	Jagannathrao Hegde	INC	18,493	24.25%	4,120
29	Shivadi	54.55%	Dadu Santu Atyalkar	Independent	22,578	31.02%	Deshpande Sudhakar Hanumanrao	INC	21,473	29.50%	1,105
30	Worli	60.69%	Vinita Datta Samant	Independent	27,412	45.03%	Vasant Pandurang Nanaware	INC	20,892	34.32%	6,520
31	Naigaon	56.99%	Vilas Vishnu Sawant	INC	24,005	34.06%	Angre Vishnu	JP	14,049	19.94%	9,956
32	Dadar	55.73%	Sharayu Govind Thakur	INC	18,134	27.39%	Sudhir Joshi	Independent	14,872	22.47%	3,262
33	Matunga	42.20%	V. Subramnian	INC	27,149	42.70%	Rustom Tirandaz	BJP	22,654	35.63%	4,495
34	Mahim	49.74%	Sham Shetty	INC	23,416	39.08%	Pinto Frederic Michael	JP	20,999	35.04%	2,417
35	Dharavi	42.83%	Dr. Jyoti Gaikwad	INC	36,396	49.32%	Vasant More	IC(S)	24,223	32.82%	12,173
36	Vandre	40.21%	Qureshi Shamim Rashid	INC	30,293	58.56%	Sudha Varde	JP	18,085	34.96%	12,208
37	Kherwadi	52.90%	Janardan Chandurkar	INC	24,063	34.21%	Madhukar Sarpotdar	Independent	19,135	27.20%	4,928
38	Vile Parle	37.75%	Hans Bhugra	INC	27,500	49.70%	Pranlal Vora	JP	25,231	45.60%	2,269
39	Amboli	41.78%	Baldev Khosa	INC	39,797	50.04%	Padmanabha Acharya	BJP	17,944	22.56%	21,853
40	Santacruz	47.17%	C. D. Ommachen	INC	34,668	46.34%	Abhiram Singh	BJP	17,497	23.39%	17,171
41	Andheri	46.15%	Ramesh Dubey	INC	47,346	53.54%	M. P. Vashi	JP	19,013	21.50%	28,333
42	Goregaon	49.55%	Mrinal Gore	JP	37,598	50.08%	Chandranath Matadin Sharma	INC	27,169	36.19%	10,429
43	Malad	45.62%	Datta (D. N. ) Chaulkar	INC	46,565	42.90%	Premnath Sehgal	BJP	22,220	20.47%	24,345
44	Kandivali	41.07%	Chandrakant Gosalia	INC	39,662	50.93%	Hansmukh Vasantrai Upadhyay	JP	23,993	30.81%	15,669
45	Borivali	48.46%	Ram Naik	BJP	59,981	51.55%	Navnit Gandhi	INC	37,454	32.19%	22,527
46	Trombay	47.30%	Javed Iqbal Khan	INC	38,965	38.12%	Mujumdar Saurabh Ramakant	BJP	22,466	21.98%	16,499
47	Chembur	51.33%	Parihar Parvati Laxmnarain	INC	35,115	43.68%	Hashu Advani	BJP	27,529	34.24%	7,586
48	Nehrunagar	51.02%	Kaka Thorat	INC	26,460	37.36%	Eknath Ramchandra Koparde	JP	14,675	20.72%	11,785
49	Kurla	46.57%	Celine D. Silva	INC	41,472	38.99%	Chavan Shantaram Sitaram	Independent	18,222	17.13%	23,250
50	Ghatkopar	47.32%	Virendra Bakshi	INC	34,692	44.04%	Prakash Mehta	BJP	20,454	25.97%	14,238
51	Bhandup	50.66%	Shekerkar Waman Ramchandra	INC	38,674	38.34%	Madhukar R. Desai	BJP	17,600	17.45%	21,074
52	Mulund	50.37%	Patil Dinanath Bama	INC	53,031	53.50%	Vamanrao Ganpatrao Parab	BJP	35,676	35.99%	17,355
53	Thane	50.60%	Kanti Kisan Koli	INC	40,890	39.51%	Satish Pradhan	Independent	29,772	28.77%	11,118
54	Belapur	47.58%	Gouri Janaradhan Shanta Ram	INC	44,882	38.95%	Ganesh Naik	Independent	42,641	37.01%	2,241
55	Ulhasnagar	55.03%	Harchandani Sitaldas Khubchand	BJP	38,159	44.45%	Tolani Ram Assudomal	INC	37,354	43.51%	805
56	Ambernath	50.90%	Nakul Pundalik Patil	INC	37,037	38.87%	Jagannath Patil	BJP	27,772	29.15%	9,265
57	Kalyan	48.28%	Ramchandra Ganesh Kapse	BJP	44,133	43.23%	Shakuntala Paranjpe	INC	38,400	37.62%	5,733
58	Murbad	59.62%	Gotiram Padu Pawar	INC	35,440	51.83%	Gholap Raghunath Ramchandra	Independent	18,352	26.84%	17,088
59	Wada	41.64%	Gowari Shankar Aba	INC	24,513	43.58%	Vishnu Rama Savar	BJP	21,145	37.59%	3,368
60	Bhiwandi	54.68%	Taware Parsharam Dhondu	JP	45,579	42.48%	R. C. Patil	INC	24,690	23.01%	20,889
61	Vasai	60.10%	Gonsalves Dominic John	JP	46,633	49.90%	Tarabai Narsinh Vartak	INC	42,696	45.68%	3,937
62	Palghar	49.09%	Valvi Vishnu Gopal	INC	22,495	38.06%	Arjun Kakadya Shingade	JP	19,713	33.36%	2,782
63	Dahanu	41.65%	Nam Shankar Sakharam	INC	34,385	65.77%	Sutar Gangaram Dhakat	CPI(M)	10,685	20.44%	23,700
64	Jawhar	51.27%	Kom Lahanu Shidva	CPI(M)	34,882	55.02%	Kirkira Tryambak Dhakal	INC	23,728	37.43%	11,154
65	Shahapur	47.66%	Mahadu Nago Barora	IC(S)	25,711	52.51%	Patil Devidas Pandurang	INC	16,914	34.54%	8,797
66	Igatpuri	46.91%	Shivram Shankar Zole	IC(S)	21,168	39.45%	Ghare Vitthalrao Ganpat	INC	17,073	31.82%	4,095
67	Nashik	55.70%	Dr. Daulatrao Aher Sonuji	BJP	42,030	44.54%	Chhajed Jayprakash Jitmal	INC	39,721	42.09%	2,309
68	Deolali	46.48%	Donde Bhikchand Haribhau	BJP	23,235	35.32%	Sathe Ranchandra Ganpat	INC	18,986	28.86%	4,249
69	Sinnar	65.56%	Dighole Tukaram Sakharam	IC(S)	35,810	48.45%	Gadhak Suryabhan Sukdeo	Independent	21,241	28.74%	14,569
70	Niphad	67.07%	Mogal Malojirao Sadashiv	IC(S)	42,674	52.47%	Boraste Manikrao Madhavrao	INC	37,411	46.00%	5,263
71	Yevla	61.18%	Marutirao Narayan Pawar	IC(S)	51,013	67.20%	Lahare Nivrutti Mahadu	INC	19,830	26.12%	31,183
72	Nandgaon	60.27%	Madhavrao Bayaji Gaikwad	CPI	25,735	34.21%	Nahar Kannyalal Chunilal	IC(S)	23,176	30.80%	2,559
73	Malegaon	69.95%	Nihal Ahmed Maulavi Mohammed Usman	JP	48,254	45.89%	Haji Shabbir Ahmed Haji Gulam Rasool	INC	45,016	42.81%	3,238
74	Dabhadi	68.11%	Hiray Pushpatai Vyakatarao	IC(S)	39,876	48.97%	Hiray Indirabai Baliram	INC	36,648	45.00%	3,228
75	Chandwad	56.80%	Kasliwal Jaichand Deepchand	BJP	29,659	47.14%	Gaikwad Narayan Kashiram	INC	23,621	37.54%	6,038
76	Dindori	56.09%	Harishankar Mahale	JP	36,851	55.64%	Chavan Harischandra Deoram	INC	24,292	36.68%	12,559
77	Surgana	49.66%	Jiva Pandu Gavit	CPI(M)	27,229	49.77%	Kahandole Zamru Manglu	INC	14,484	26.47%	12,745
78	Kalwan	66.37%	Bahiram Kashinath Narayan	IC(S)	37,906	51.80%	Pawar Arjun Tulshiram	INC	34,882	47.67%	3,024
79	Baglan	62.81%	Gangurde Runja Punjaram	IC(S)	40,703	57.11%	Ahire Shankar Daulat	INC	28,271	39.67%	12,432
80	Sakri	60.18%	Govindrao Shivram Chaudhary	BJP	49,359	64.55%	Malusare Sukram Bhurya	INC	25,799	33.74%	23,560
81	Navapur	65.27%	Surupsingh Hirya Naik	INC	62,580	74.93%	Vasant Dodha Suryavanshi	JP	13,565	16.24%	49,015
82	Nandurbar	45.31%	Indrasing Diwansing Vasave	INC	42,444	73.09%	Valvi Pravin Jalamsing	JP	13,829	23.81%	28,615
83	Talode	47.88%	Arjunsing Pirsing Valvi	INC	22,591	49.06%	Dilwarsing D. Padvi	BJP	18,350	39.85%	4,241
84	Akrani	57.55%	Pawara Rameshbhai Thikya	INC	32,987	61.94%	Appasaheb Shankar Fugara Jadhav	JP	16,165	30.35%	16,822
85	Shahada	76.59%	Annasaheb P. K. Patil	JP	52,271	55.45%	Dadasaheb Rawal Jayasinh Daulatsinh	INC	40,474	42.94%	11,797
86	Shirpur	67.04%	Patil Sambhaji Hiraman	JP	48,727	61.33%	Indrasing Chandrasing Rajput	INC	30,099	37.89%	18,628
87	Sindkheda	61.50%	Rajput Mangalsing Nimji Alias Thansing Jibhau	Independent	21,708	32.58%	Patil Vidyatai Laxman	INC	18,726	28.10%	2,982
88	Kusumba	56.02%	Dattatray Waman Patil	INC	41,835	63.23%	Chaudhari Hiraman Ratan	PWPI	22,477	33.97%	19,358
89	Dhule	55.10%	Shalini Sudhakar Borase	INC	28,562	40.61%	Abasaheb N. C. Patil	IC(S)	20,528	29.19%	8,034
90	Chalisgaon	45.84%	Changare Vasudevrao Apuram	IC(S)	33,622	53.84%	Chavan Dinakarrao Diwan	INC	28,003	44.84%	5,619
91	Parola	61.23%	Vasantrao Jivanrao More	IC(S)	50,640	59.92%	Patil Bhaskarrao Rajaram	INC	29,853	35.32%	20,787
92	Amalner	61.81%	Amrutrao Vamanrao Patil	INC	43,545	53.05%	Gulabrao Wamanrao Patil	JP	38,041	46.34%	5,504
93	Chopda	73.52%	Arunlal Gowardhandas Gujrathi	IC(S)	44,972	56.38%	Suresh G. Patil	INC	30,887	38.72%	14,085
94	Erandol	58.23%	Wagh Parvatabai Chandrabhan	INC	27,804	37.68%	Patil Nimbajirao Baliram	Independent	22,846	30.96%	4,958
95	Jalgaon	59.40%	Sureshkumar Bhikamchand Jain	IC(S)	47,629	54.51%	Choudhari Ramesh Pandit	INC	35,819	41.00%	11,810
96	Pachora	63.59%	Onkar Narayan Wagh	JP	45,855	55.38%	Krishnarao Maharu Patil	INC	31,965	38.60%	13,890
97	Jamner	52.97%	Babusing Dagadusing Rathod	INC	29,964	48.64%	Narayan Sonaji Patil	Independent	16,165	26.24%	13,799
98	Bhusawal	53.57%	Chaudhari Dagadu Kashiram	JP	36,495	47.06%	Akhatar Ali Kazi	INC	33,321	42.97%	3,174
99	Yawal	55.56%	Jivaram Tukaram Mahajan	INC	32,685	54.04%	Borole Yashwant Mansaram	JP	19,009	31.43%	13,676
100	Raver	57.57%	Dr. Gunwantrao Rambhau Sarode	BJP	27,074	40.56%	Mirabai Dagekhan Tadavi	INC	22,463	33.65%	4,611
101	Edlabad	65.52%	Jaware Haribhau Dagadu	IC(S)	41,546	51.49%	Choudhari Ramakant Vasudev	INC	34,963	43.33%	6,583
102	Malkapur	65.43%	Vasantrao Ramdas Shinde	INC	33,042	44.48%	Arjun Awadhut Wankhade	BJP	31,356	42.21%	1,686
103	Buldhana	64.68%	Patil Vithalrao Sonaji	INC	36,277	43.03%	Patil Sumanbai Shivajirao	IC(S)	31,850	37.78%	4,427
104	Chikhali	72.40%	Bharat Rajabhau Bondre	IC(S)	53,243	56.06%	Janardan Dattuappa Bondre	INC	34,523	36.35%	18,720
105	Sindkhed Raja	73.09%	Kayande Totaram Tukaram	IC(S)	44,513	48.09%	Shingane Bhaskarrao Sampatrao	INC	37,935	40.98%	6,578
106	Mehkar	71.30%	Subodh Keshao Saoji	Independent	31,817	37.37%	Rahate Ruprao Ayaji	IC(S)	28,177	33.10%	3,640
107	Khamgaon	63.61%	Gawande Manikrao Pralhadrao	INC	37,261	43.14%	Fundkar Pandurang Pundlik	BJP	31,153	36.07%	6,108
108	Jalamb	67.83%	Shradha Prabhakar Tapare	INC	33,537	41.83%	Deshmukh Gajananrao Shankarrao	PWPI	32,719	40.81%	818
109	Akot	66.52%	Gangane Sudhakar Ramkrishna	INC	41,426	56.55%	Atmaram Tulshiram Bhople	Independent	21,922	29.92%	19,504
110	Borgaon Manju	63.33%	Dhotre Vasantrao Ramrao	INC	42,094	50.28%	Ingale Shrawan Shekoji	Independent	20,486	24.47%	21,608
111	Akole	57.48%	Gaikwad Ramdas Shankarrao	INC	35,436	48.41%	Qazi Mohammed Ali Ibrahim Ali	Independent	20,138	27.51%	15,298
112	Balapur	63.22%	Khotre Gowardhan Janadan	INC	29,207	39.25%	Abdullaha Khan Manzer Manwerkhan	Independent	24,206	32.53%	5,001
113	Medshi	62.03%	Zanak Subhash Ramraoji	INC	35,235	51.59%	Badhe Shesharao Bhaurao	Independent	24,837	36.37%	10,398
114	Washim	53.22%	Kamble Bhimrao Haibati	INC	24,267	41.76%	Sonone Ramprabhoo Suryabhan	IC(S)	23,225	39.97%	1,042
115	Mangrulpir	65.09%	Rathod Devisin Thanwara	INC	31,193	40.77%	Gadhawe Namdeorao Madhaorao	Independent	27,867	36.42%	3,326
116	Murtizapur	62.05%	Suhas Bhagwantrao Tidke	INC	33,071	47.01%	Dhotre Sahebrao Deorao	BJP	18,606	26.45%	14,465
117	Karanja	63.25%	Anantrao Vithhalrao Deshmukh	INC	25,376	39.18%	Bang Manohar Motilalji	PWPI	20,071	30.99%	5,305
118	Daryapur	67.21%	Raosaheb Pandurang Hadole	INC	28,043	38.50%	Ashoksinha Laxmansinha Gaharwar	IC(S)	25,742	35.34%	2,301
119	Melghat	43.26%	Patel Ramu Mhatang	INC	40,441	81.66%	Hiralal Onkar	BJP	6,348	12.82%	34,093
120	Achalpur	63.24%	Deshmukh Sudam Alias Waman Dattaraya	Independent	38,211	49.53%	Deshmukh Sunil Panjabrao	INC	20,123	26.08%	18,088
121	Morshi	65.38%	Maukar Purushottam Gulab	INC	27,651	39.53%	Thakre Daulatrao Laxmanrao	IC(S)	25,401	36.31%	2,250
122	Teosa	66.48%	Tasare Sharad Motiram	IC(S)	31,425	45.85%	Deshmukh Vishwas Krushnarao	INC	25,508	37.22%	5,917
123	Walgaon	56.65%	Varhade Anil Gopalrao	INC	28,080	47.10%	Deshmukh Nilkanth Madahavrao	IC(S)	16,479	27.64%	11,601
124	Amravati	51.19%	Devisingh Ransingh Shekhawat	INC	37,330	54.22%	Chandrabha Alias Chandraprabha Narendra Boke	IC(S)	15,612	22.68%	21,718
125	Badnera	53.88%	Meghe Ram Krushnarao	INC	27,374	44.79%	Gawande Arun Vithalrao	IC(S)	18,573	30.39%	8,801
126	Chandur	71.76%	Sherekar Yashwant Gangaram	INC	32,156	43.66%	Pratap Arunbhau Adsad	BJP	28,138	38.20%	4,018
127	Arvi	67.75%	Dr. Sharadrao Kale	IC(S)	38,955	44.16%	Shridhar S. Thakare	INC	38,499	43.65%	456
128	Pulgaon	61.30%	Prabha Anand Rao	INC	39,419	52.62%	Karlekar Vasantrao Janardanrao	IC(S)	19,909	26.58%	19,510
129	Wardha	57.94%	Pramod Bhauraoji Shende	INC	38,982	51.42%	Ramchandra Ghangare Marot	CPI(M)	20,212	26.66%	18,770
130	Hinganghat	68.74%	Bonde Vasnat Laxmanrao	IC(S)	42,633	43.36%	Deshmukh Suresh Bapuraoji	INC	32,596	33.15%	10,037
131	Umred	65.69%	Parate Shrawan Govindrao	IC(S)	45,223	55.64%	Bhausaheb Govindrao Mulak	INC	30,650	37.71%	14,573
132	Kamthi	49.52%	Bhoyar Yadavrao Krushnarao	INC	44,718	70.26%	Ramtake Sampat Mukaji	RPI	12,648	19.87%	32,070
133	Nagpur North	44.57%	Damuantibai Madhukar Deshbhratar	INC	35,507	54.60%	Dongre Suryakant Jagobaji	RPI	26,364	40.54%	9,143
134	Nagpur East	60.41%	Avinash Pandey	INC	50,350	44.15%	Satish Jhaulal Chaturvedi	Independent	34,901	30.60%	15,449
135	Nagpur South	58.47%	Dhawad Ashok Shankarrao	INC	40,488	52.42%	Ramteke Umakant Rambhau	RPI	17,837	23.09%	22,651
136	Nagpur Central	55.42%	Shoukat Raheman Qureshi	INC	24,927	38.59%	Parshiwanikar Vasant Kawadooji	IC(S)	22,811	35.31%	2,116
137	Nagpur West	53.88%	Gev Manchersha Avari	INC	49,607	50.99%	Nitin Gadkari	BJP	28,055	28.84%	21,552
138	Kalmeshwar	63.00%	Gaikwad Bhagwantrao Manikrao	INC	34,035	46.36%	Deshmukh Sudhakar Shamraoji	IC(S)	30,975	42.19%	3,060
139	Katol	71.34%	Sunil Shamrao Shinde	IC(S)	38,596	51.30%	Shrikant Ramchandra Jichkar	INC	30,246	40.20%	8,350
140	Savner	58.06%	Ranjeet Deshmukh	INC	34,728	51.58%	Dadarao Mahadeorao Mangele	BJP	25,539	37.93%	9,189
141	Ramtek	64.19%	Pandurang Jairamji Hajare	JP	41,445	48.40%	Kimmatkar Madhukar Ghanshyamrao	INC	36,157	42.23%	5,288
142	Tumsar	71.76%	Ishwardayalji Mahipal Patle	JP	35,534	44.57%	Karemore Subhashchandra Narayanraoji	INC	30,399	38.13%	5,135
143	Bhandara	69.41%	Anandrao Tukaramji Wanjari	INC	29,225	38.21%	Dhananjay Madhaorao Dalal	IC(S)	16,033	20.96%	13,192
144	Adyar	71.95%	Shrungapawar Vilas Vishwanath	INC	34,455	41.55%	Ramteke Harishchandra Sadashiorao	RPI	20,836	25.13%	13,619
145	Tirora	66.20%	More Harish Ukandrao	IC(S)	42,336	53.80%	Tirpude Rajkumar Nashikrao	INC	25,346	32.21%	16,990
146	Gondiya	57.97%	Rajkumari Gopalnarayan Bajpayee	INC	26,104	37.77%	Agrawal Radheshyam Harinarayan	JP	20,631	29.85%	5,473
147	Goregaon	74.54%	Khushal Parasram Bopche	BJP	44,046	52.33%	Patel Praful Manoharbhai	INC	38,707	45.98%	5,339
148	Amgaon	69.80%	Mahadeo Shivankar	BJP	51,114	56.24%	Jain Swaroopchand Jethmal	INC	36,897	40.60%	14,217
149	Sakoli	68.95%	Katakwar Jayant Krushanmurari	INC	29,743	36.13%	Nimbekar Govindrao Shivaji	Independent	22,362	27.17%	7,381
150	Lakhandur	73.42%	Diwathe Namdeo Harbaji	BJP	48,509	51.04%	Hiralal Nathamalji Bhiyya	INC	27,274	28.69%	21,235
151	Armori	62.41%	Weakey Sukhadeobabu Pundalik	IC(S)	50,356	68.43%	Madavi Baburao Narayan	INC	18,895	25.68%	31,461
152	Gadchiroli	54.12%	Warkhadde Hiraman Benduji	JP	28,427	45.81%	Kowase Marotrao Sainuji	INC	27,559	44.41%	868
153	Sironcha	55.26%	Atram Raje Satyavanrao Raje Vishveshvarrao	Independent	33,186	57.25%	Talandi Penta Rama	INC	18,745	32.34%	14,441
154	Rajura	59.57%	Mamulkar Prabhakar Bapurao	INC	39,356	50.80%	Babasaheb Sonbaji Wasade	IC(S)	21,446	27.68%	17,910
155	Chandrapur	59.99%	Shyam Gopalrao Wankhede	INC	49,099	52.63%	Khobragade Girish Dewaji	RPI(K)	27,133	29.09%	21,966
156	Saoli	64.40%	Gaddamwar Waman Vistari	INC	36,611	45.95%	Shobha Fadnavis	BJP	26,933	33.80%	9,678
157	Bramhapuri	75.48%	Khanokar Suresh Chintamanrao	IC(S)	41,306	41.24%	Shriram Nanaji Bhoyar	Independent	25,456	25.42%	15,850
158	Chimur	65.66%	Bagde Bhujangrao Mukundrao	INC	45,235	51.85%	M. Rahemtulla Abdul Hakim	Independent	13,008	14.91%	32,227
159	Bhadrawati	61.73%	Moreshwar Vithalrao Temurde	Independent	36,088	43.44%	Dadasaheb Deotale	INC	26,197	31.54%	9,891
160	Wani	63.99%	Namdeorao Narayanrao Kale	CPI	47,507	64.91%	Panghate Bapurao Harbaji	INC	23,699	32.38%	23,808
161	Ralegaon	44.64%	Gulabrao Bajirao Uike	INC	33,783	61.94%	Madavi Dadarao Nimbaji	IC(S)	16,311	29.91%	17,472
162	Kelapur	57.14%	Shivajirao Moghe	INC	43,885	72.14%	Yerame Uddhaorao Champatrao	BJP	16,946	27.86%	26,939
163	Yavatmal	48.47%	Sadashivrao Bapuji Thakre	INC	38,416	64.70%	Balshaheb Ghuikhedkar	IC(S)	10,081	16.98%	28,335
164	Darwha	68.22%	Manikrao Govindrao Thakare	INC	33,594	43.51%	Rathode Shankarrao Gopal	IC(S)	31,911	41.33%	1,683
165	Digras	61.95%	Manasaheb Suryabhanji Tajane	INC	33,416	43.23%	Vilasrao Krushanarao Raut	IC(S)	23,632	30.57%	9,784
166	Pusad	74.16%	Sudhakarrao Rajusing Naik	INC	55,314	59.96%	Deshmukh Gulabrao Jayawantrao	IC(S)	20,358	22.07%	34,956
167	Umarkhed	70.56%	Deshmukh Bhimrao Apparao	INC	41,236	48.17%	Deosarkar Anantrao Aparao	IC(S)	36,092	42.16%	5,144
168	Kinwat	57.86%	Pachpute Kishanrao Ghampatrao	INC	18,613	30.40%	Rathod Indrasingh Bhasu	IC(S)	17,338	28.32%	1,275
169	Hadgaon	64.94%	Ashtikar Bapurao Shivram Patil	IC(S)	46,365	55.52%	Deshmukh Vinayakrao Ramrao	INC	30,873	36.97%	15,492
170	Nanded	57.31%	Kamalkishor Kadam	IC(S)	30,462	33.68%	Kabra Ramnarayan Ramdev	INC	27,392	30.28%	3,070
171	Mudkhed	52.50%	Sahebrao Baradkar Deshmukh	INC	40,658	62.18%	Chandrakant Govindrao Maski	BJP	14,664	22.43%	25,994
172	Bhokar	61.22%	Deshmukh Balajirao Gopalrao	INC	30,912	45.24%	Kinalkar Madhavrao Bhujangrao	IC(S)	28,569	41.81%	2,343
173	Biloli	59.39%	Kuntoorkar Gangadhar Rao Mohanrao	INC	46,360	51.38%	Chavan Balwant Rao Amrutrao	IC(S)	36,613	40.58%	9,747
174	Mukhed	48.06%	Ghate Madhukarrao Rangoji	INC	31,238	47.26%	Khankare Shivraj Kallappa	Independent	17,699	26.78%	13,539
175	Kandhar	60.19%	Keshavrao Shankarrao Dhondge	PWPI	50,461	60.13%	Ishwarrao Naryanrao Bhosikar	INC	30,732	36.62%	19,729
176	Gangakhed	55.59%	Gaikwad Dnyanoba Hari	PWPI	39,287	61.97%	Sawant Iraimbakrao Maretirao	INC	19,685	31.05%	19,602
177	Singnapur	59.78%	Game Balasaheb Rajaramji	INC	37,562	53.42%	Gawali Uttamrao Abaji	IC(S)	30,955	44.03%	6,607
178	Parbhani	51.81%	Gawane Vijay Annasaheb	PWPI	26,335	37.56%	Ayeshabegum Iqbalhussain	INC	22,346	31.87%	3,989
179	Basmath	49.30%	Jadhav Munjajirao Narayanrao	INC	29,698	47.64%	Deshmukh Panditrao Ramrao	JP	21,176	33.97%	8,522
180	Kalamnuri	46.92%	Adv. Rajani Shankarrao Satav	INC	24,042	40.68%	Maske Vithlrao Champatrao Naik	CPI(M)	12,317	20.84%	11,725
181	Hingoli	56.86%	Shebrao Narayanrao Patil Goregaonkar	INC	38,442	51.54%	Thorat Dattrao Haibatrao	Independent	20,085	26.93%	18,357
182	Jintur	62.28%	Ganeshrao Raut Dudhgaonkar	INC	33,833	45.47%	Seshrao Apparao Deshmukh	PWPI	25,574	34.37%	8,259
183	Pathri	49.57%	Wadiker Digamberrao Sahebrao	IC(S)	24,011	45.62%	Dakh Baba Saheb Marotrao	INC	21,603	41.04%	2,408
184	Partur	61.29%	Akat Vaijanathrao Yadavrao	IC(S)	46,231	62.83%	Borade Bhagwanrao Daulatrao	INC	24,234	32.94%	21,997
185	Ambad	49.41%	Vilas Vithalrao Kharat	INC	31,495	46.46%	Ankush Bhalekar	JP	21,850	32.23%	9,645
186	Jalna	48.21%	Dayma Ramkishan Ramchandra	INC	23,809	35.88%	Radhakishanlala Bhaggulal Jaiswal	JP	15,499	23.35%	8,310
187	Badnapur	57.06%	Appasaheb Sheshrao Chavan	IC(S)	39,747	54.31%	Bhandarage Dnyanshar Rangnath	INC	25,164	34.38%	14,583
188	Bhokardan	59.07%	Santoshrao Valuba Despute	INC	39,446	50.02%	Raosaheb Dadarao Danve	BJP	37,878	48.03%	1,568
189	Sillod	68.57%	Manikrao Palodkar Sandu	INC	34,377	43.86%	Pathrikar Dwarkadas Yeshwantrao	IC(S)	24,501	31.26%	9,876
190	Kannad	59.21%	Kishore Patil Adhav	IC(S)	29,462	37.29%	Narayan Girmaji Patil	INC	19,778	25.04%	9,684
191	Vaijapur	64.51%	Ramkrishna Baba Patil	IC(S)	37,911	50.78%	Kailas Ramrao Patil	INC	35,617	47.71%	2,294
192	Gangapur	48.20%	Kisanrao Kasane	IC(S)	32,435	46.78%	Laxmanrao Munal	INC	26,757	38.59%	5,678
193	Aurangabad West	51.30%	Amanulla Motiawala	IC(S)	41,235	38.47%	S. T. Pradhan	INC	40,849	38.11%	386
194	Aurangabad East	50.80%	Haribhau Bagade	BJP	32,174	42.61%	Sudhakar Sonwane	INC	26,103	34.57%	6,071
195	Paithan	54.94%	Chandrakant Sonaki Ghodke	IC(S)	30,124	46.23%	Mohan Anandrao Deshmukh	INC	21,816	33.48%	8,308
196	Georai	65.11%	Shivajirao Ankushrao	IC(S)	47,844	57.40%	Madhavrao Shivajirao Pawar	INC	33,175	39.80%	14,669
197	Majalgaon	53.83%	Mohan Digambar Rao Solunke	IC(S)	37,200	45.83%	Radhakrishna Sahebrao Patail	INC	35,331	43.53%	1,869
198	Beed	48.41%	Sirajuddin Safderali Deshmukh	INC	24,581	35.05%	Jagtap Rajendra Sahebrao	Independent	21,342	30.43%	3,239
199	Ashti	48.07%	Bhimrao Anandrao Dhonde	INC	40,814	56.76%	Kranti Sudhakarrao Choudhari	IC(S)	25,380	35.30%	15,434
200	Chausala	47.24%	Patil Ashokrao Shankarrao	INC	21,967	30.56%	Deshmukh Dnyanoba Sonerao	Independent	19,243	26.77%	2,724
201	Kaij	45.64%	Bhagoji Nivruttirao Satpute	IC(S)	32,967	50.29%	Anant Shankarrao Jagatkar	INC	24,096	36.75%	8,871
202	Renapur	61.98%	Dound Panditrao Narayanrao	INC	35,718	40.97%	Gopinath Pandurang Munde	BJP	33,067	37.93%	2,651
203	Ahmedpur	58.55%	Patil Ramchandrarao Shankarrao	INC	33,690	46.75%	Deshmukh Kishanrao Nanasaheb	PWPI	31,469	43.66%	2,221
204	Udgir	66.48%	Jadhav Balasaheb Kishanrao	INC	46,231	52.98%	Patwari Manoharrao Digamberrao	Independent	39,066	44.77%	7,165
205	Her	52.36%	Dharmaraj Girjappa Sonkawade	INC	27,474	47.56%	Kamble Trimbak Pandurang	JP	22,057	38.18%	5,417
206	Latur	65.22%	Vilasrao Dagadojirao Deshmukh	INC	69,599	63.58%	Gomare Manoharrao Eknathrao	JP	29,303	26.77%	40,296
207	Kalamb	58.12%	Ghodke Kundlik Eknath	PWPI	37,406	52.09%	Bhosale Vinayak Yadavrao	INC	17,413	24.25%	19,993
208	Paranda	68.22%	Anandrao Maharudra Mote	IC(S)	39,755	45.61%	Shankarrao Bhagwantrao Talekar	INC	26,737	30.67%	13,018
209	Osmanabad	73.63%	Dr. Padamsinh Bajirao Patil	IC(S)	52,197	56.81%	Chavan Madhukarrao Deorao	INC	37,729	41.06%	14,468
210	Ausa	70.67%	Jadhav Kishanrao Sampatrao	IC(S)	42,670	55.57%	Utge Shivshankarappa Vishwanathappa	INC	28,216	36.74%	14,454
211	Nilanga	68.99%	Deelipkumar Shivajirao Patil Nilangekar	INC	61,946	68.84%	Madhukarrao Ganpatrao Somwanshi	PWPI	22,391	24.88%	39,555
212	Omerga	65.52%	Kazi Abdul Khalek A. Kadar	INC	40,925	50.16%	Birajdar Bhalchandra Ramrao	IC(S)	38,834	47.59%	2,091
213	Tuljapur	72.18%	Khaple Manikrao Bhimrao	PWPI	42,553	56.67%	Alure Sidramappa Nagappa	INC	31,323	41.72%	11,230
214	Akkalkot	63.10%	Patil Mahadeo Kashiraya	INC	41,817	61.84%	Khedagi Chandabasappa Baslingappa	BJP	23,585	34.88%	18,232
215	Solapur South	64.52%	Anandrao Narayan Devkate	INC	41,404	60.30%	Vishwanath Shivashankar Birajdar	JP	24,691	35.96%	16,713
216	Solapur City South	62.03%	Yalgulwar Prakash Balkrishna	INC	32,959	45.92%	Shaikh Mohammed Yunnns Jainoddin	IC(S)	26,240	36.56%	6,719
217	Solapur City North	65.52%	Chakote Baburao Channappa	INC	38,370	57.85%	Raleraskar Ravindra Ramkrishna	BJP	23,302	35.13%	15,068
218	North Sholapur	57.98%	Sushilkumar Sambhaji Shinde	INC	63,475	82.88%	Shinde Mallapppa Hanmantu	Independent	13,113	17.12%	50,362
219	Mangalwedha	62.41%	Dhobale Laxman Kondiba	IC(S)	43,944	59.04%	Aute Sushila Laxman	INC	28,390	38.15%	15,554
220	Mohol	75.05%	Shahjiroa Shankarrao Patil	INC	42,919	50.10%	Patil Baburao Bajirao	PWPI	42,752	49.90%	167
221	Barshi	68.36%	Dilip Gangadhar Sopal	IC(S)	42,822	55.59%	Patil Baburao Shankarrao (Gadegaonkar)	INC	32,969	42.80%	9,853
222	Madha	66.48%	Pandurang Ganapat Patil	Independent	38,760	45.78%	Maske Prakash Tukaram	INC	29,890	35.30%	8,870
223	Pandharpur	77.17%	Sudhakar Ramchandra Paricharak	INC	60,817	55.50%	Yeshawantrao Gopalrao Patil	IC(S)	47,173	43.05%	13,644
224	Sangola	69.76%	Ganpatrao Abasaheb Deshmukh	PWPI	54,816	54.41%	Bhambyre Pandurang Abasaheb	INC	45,923	45.59%	8,893
225	Malshiras	75.11%	Vijaysinh Mohite–Patil	INC	89,397	83.35%	Tate Subhash Mahadeo	IC(S)	16,635	15.51%	72,762
226	Karmala	64.43%	Patil Raosaheb Bhagwanrao	Independent	34,511	54.06%	Namadeorao Mahadeorao Jagtap	INC	23,956	37.52%	10,555
227	Karjat	52.34%	Dagadu Sakharam Nikalji (Guruji)	INC	21,668	34.16%	Prabhakarao Rupawate	Independent	18,116	28.56%	3,552
228	Shrigonda	71.81%	Pachpute Babanrao Bhikaji	JP	57,258	57.73%	Shivajirao Narayanrao Nagwade	INC	38,244	38.56%	19,014
229	Ahmednagar South	61.40%	Kalamkar Dadabhau Dasarth Rao	IC(S)	49,929	62.60%	Asir Shaikh Mohammad Ismail	INC	25,980	32.57%	23,949
230	Ahmednagar North	56.94%	Shelke Maruti Deoram	INC	46,137	56.30%	Ashok Sambhaji Rao Babat	IC(S)	17,096	20.86%	29,041
231	Pathardi	63.87%	Babanrao Dhakne	JP	43,977	52.57%	Appasaheb Dadaba Rajale	INC	36,223	43.30%	7,754
232	Shegaon	56.97%	Phatke Sambhajirao Shankarrao	INC	32,915	48.64%	Mungase Murlidhar Baburao	IC(S)	17,665	26.10%	15,250
233	Shrirampur	61.41%	Daulatrao Malhari Pawar	IC(S)	32,929	48.94%	Jathar Suresh Govindrao	INC	26,680	39.65%	6,249
234	Shirdi	72.91%	Mhaske Annasaheb Sarangdhar	INC	41,353	52.13%	Mhaske Raosaheb Nathaji	IC(S)	36,069	45.47%	5,284
235	Kopargaon	67.57%	Rohamare Dadasaheb Shahji	INC	42,028	54.87%	Kale Sambhajirao Kisan	IC(S)	33,221	43.37%	8,807
236	Rahuri	74.52%	Prasadrao Baburao Tanpure	Independent	47,043	54.51%	Dhumal Ramdas Vishwanath	IC(S)	23,661	27.42%	23,382
237	Parner	59.49%	Zaware Nandkumar Bahusaheb	INC	21,155	34.05%	Thube Babasaheb Alias Prabhakar Appasheb	Independent	20,198	32.51%	957
238	Sangamner	71.54%	Vijay Bhausaheb Thorat	Independent	40,218	44.40%	Thorat Shakuntala Khanderao	INC	30,059	33.19%	10,159
239	Nagar–Akola	52.89%	Madhukar Pichad	INC	36,261	49.53%	Rajaram Sakharam Bhahgare	IC(S)	25,883	35.36%	10,378
240	Junnar	69.38%	Vallabh Benke	IC(S)	41,840	51.27%	Nivrittishet Namdeo Sherkar	INC	38,412	47.07%	3,428
241	Ambegaon	61.64%	Kisanrao Bankhele	JP	35,297	58.14%	Padval Chhayatai	INC	19,530	32.17%	15,767
242	Khed Alandi	61.90%	Narayanrao Baburao Pawar	IC(S)	48,758	60.74%	Ghumatkar Shantaram Nathuji	INC	28,326	35.28%	20,432
243	Maval	62.89%	Bafna Madanlal Harakchand	INC	37,028	47.76%	Bhegde Vishwanath Rambhau	BJP	30,071	38.79%	6,957
244	Mulshi	60.98%	Ashok Namdeorao Mohol	INC	45,160	56.79%	Konde Shivajirao Narayan	IC(S)	34,043	42.81%	11,117
245	Haveli	54.48%	Tapkir Ashok Kalyanrao	INC	60,706	47.38%	Landage Balasaheb Shankar	JP	48,052	37.50%	12,654
246	Bopodi	58.95%	Rambhau Genba Moze	IC(S)	33,625	51.94%	Sawant B. B.	INC	22,997	35.52%	10,628
247	Shivajinagar	58.65%	Laxman Sonopant Joshi	BJP	48,969	49.04%	Shridhar Madgulkar	INC	48,858	48.92%	111
248	Parvati	54.08%	Sharad Ranpise	INC	42,836	46.56%	Vishwas Krishnarao Gangurde	BJP	34,517	37.52%	8,319
249	Kasba Peth	63.29%	Ulhas Nathoba Kalokhe	INC	35,588	48.03%	Arvind Lele	BJP	31,321	42.27%	4,267
250	Bhavani Peth	56.05%	Dhere Prakash Keshavrao	Independent	34,745	49.24%	Bhalchandra Vaidya	JP	24,899	35.28%	9,846
251	Pune Cantonment	64.62%	Vitthal Tupe	JP	44,997	48.25%	Balasaheb Alias Chandrakant Shivarkar	INC	44,820	48.06%	177
252	Shirur	64.89%	Bapusaheb Thite	IC(S)	36,994	51.82%	Dhariwal Rasiklal Manikchand	INC	32,880	46.06%	4,114
253	Daund	53.63%	Ushadevi Krishnarao Jagdale	IC(S)	33,408	43.30%	Ashok Bapurao Khalakdar	INC	25,415	32.94%	7,993
254	Indapur	66.74%	Ganpatrao Sitaram Patil	INC	45,511	50.78%	Jagannathrao Marutrao More	IC(S)	40,613	45.32%	4,898
255	Baramati	73.66%	Sharad Pawar	IC(S)	53,545	58.66%	Kakade Shahajiraje Mugutrao	INC	35,501	38.89%	18,044
256	Purandar	59.64%	Dada Jadhav	JP	46,712	57.74%	Saste Harishandra Sopanrao	INC	27,916	34.50%	18,796
257	Bhor	72.14%	Anantrao Thopate	INC	52,038	67.15%	Khatape Vasant Maruti	IC(S)	24,195	31.22%	27,843
258	Phaltan	72.96%	Kadam Suryajirao Shankarrao Alais Chimanrao	Independent	46,763	51.96%	Bhosale Rajaram Sakharam Alias Raja Bhonsale Bar-At-Law	IC(S)	35,992	39.99%	10,771
259	Man	58.34%	Sonavane Vishnu Tatoba	IC(S)	41,092	54.17%	Mane Gundopant Balaji	INC	32,513	42.86%	8,579
260	Khatav	74.75%	Gudage Mohanrao Pandurang	Independent	39,267	44.60%	Patil Keshavrao Shankarrao	INC	31,620	35.92%	7,647
261	Koregaon	71.55%	Jagtap Shankarrao Chimaji	INC	48,049	58.69%	Phalke Shivaji Govindrao	IC(S)	33,165	40.51%	14,884
262	Wai	70.96%	Madanrao Ganpatrao Pisal	INC	38,074	50.03%	Arvind Baburao Chavan	IC(S)	37,231	48.92%	843
263	Jaoli	65.53%	Dhondiram Bhikoba Kadam	INC	43,057	53.50%	Lalsingrao Bapuso Shinde	Independent	24,429	30.35%	18,628
264	Satara	71.13%	Abhaysinh Shahumaharaj Bhosale	INC	60,677	68.45%	Jadhav Sarjerao Vithalrao	IC(S)	26,754	30.18%	33,923
265	Patan	74.48%	Vikramsinh Ranjitsinh Patankar	IC(S)	48,873	56.52%	Daulatrao Shripatrao Desai	INC	36,930	42.71%	11,943
266	Karad North	70.27%	Ashtekar Shyam Alias Janardan Balkrishna	IC(S)	48,134	53.44%	Pandurang Dadasaheb Patil	INC	40,978	45.50%	7,156
267	Karad South	73.45%	Vilasrao Balkrishna Patil	INC	54,159	55.45%	Vilasrao Govind Patil	IC(S)	42,390	43.40%	11,769
268	Shirala	72.88%	Shivajirao Bapusaheb Deshmukh	INC	59,271	63.47%	Chavan Narayan Pandurang	IC(S)	34,114	36.53%	25,157
269	Walva	73.22%	Nagnath Naikwadi	Independent	47,970	48.81%	Shinde Vilasrao Bhauso	INC	40,616	41.33%	7,354
270	Bhilwadi Wangi	78.99%	Patangrao Kadam	Independent	63,865	63.30%	Sampatrao Annasaheb Chavan	INC	33,700	33.40%	30,165
271	Sangli	62.86%	Vasantrao Banduji Patil	INC	51,636	69.06%	Pailwan Mohite Namdrao Ganapati	IC(S)	22,051	29.49%	29,585
272	Miraj	69.41%	Shinde Mohanrao Alias Ramsing Ganpatrao	INC	36,815	45.15%	Patil Sharad Ramgonda	JP	22,231	27.26%	14,584
273	Tasgaon	52.14%	Dinkarrao (Aba) Krishnaji Patil	INC	47,722	81.43%	Amrutsagar Ganpati Abaji	Independent	10,885	18.57%	36,837
274	Khanapur Atpadi	67.99%	Mane Sampatrao Sitaram	INC	48,659	54.18%	Patil Hanamantrao Yashwantrao	IC(S)	40,617	45.23%	8,042
275	Kavathe Mahankal	65.63%	Vitthal Shripati Patil	INC	38,497	47.71%	Ajitrao Shankarrao Ghorpade	JP	31,427	38.95%	7,070
276	Jat	34.41%	Sanamadikar Umaji Dhanappa	INC	34,992	82.96%	Shivasharan Dnyanu Kalu	PWPI	7,186	17.04%	27,806
277	Shirol	68.65%	Khanjire Sarojani Babasaheb	INC	49,103	53.34%	Yadav Dinkarrao Bhausaheb	PWPI	38,571	41.90%	10,532
278	Ichalkaranji	74.73%	Prakashanna Awade	INC	51,791	44.82%	K. L. Malabade	CPI(M)	32,244	27.90%	19,547
279	Vadgaon	51.37%	Avale Jayawant Gangaram	INC	39,697	58.95%	Mane Nanasaheb Shantaram	IC(S)	18,054	26.81%	21,643
280	Shahuwadi	76.63%	Sanjaysing Jayasingrao Gaikwad	Independent	44,771	51.30%	Babasaheb Yeshwantrao Patil Sarudkar	INC	40,471	46.37%	4,300
281	Panhala	72.04%	Patil Yeshwant Eknath	INC	42,640	55.59%	Patil Dattatray Ramchandra	IC(S)	27,761	36.19%	14,879
282	Sangrul	81.12%	Kalikate Govindrao Tukaram	PWPI	47,270	49.59%	Bondre Shripatrao Shankarrao	INC	46,546	48.83%	724
283	Radhanagari	72.12%	Desai Bajarang Anandrao	IC(S)	37,002	40.66%	Patil Krishnarao Parashram	Independent	33,026	36.29%	3,976
284	Kolhapur	46.93%	N. D. Patil	PWPI	34,986	52.90%	Yadav Lalsaheb Belasaheb	INC	22,140	33.48%	12,846
285	Karvir	61.31%	Digvijay Bhauso Khanvilkar	INC	46,531	54.38%	Patil H. D. (Baba)	IC(S)	30,759	35.95%	15,772
286	Kagal	84.44%	Sadashivrao Dadoba Mandlik	IC(S)	46,298	49.86%	Ghatage Vikramsinh Jayasingrao	INC	46,067	49.61%	231
287	Gadhinglaj	78.57%	Shinde Shripatrao Dinkarrao	JP	52,285	58.53%	Ghali Shivaling Shivayogi	INC	35,277	39.49%	17,008
288	Chandgad	81.44%	Chavan Patil V. K.	INC	33,232	35.16%	Narsingrao Gurunath Patil	Independent	30,387	32.15%	2,845
