= Deshmukh =

Indian historical title

Deshmukh (IAST: Dēśamukh) is a historical title conferred to the rulers of a Dēśamukhi. It is used as a surname in certain regions of India, especially in the states of Maharashtra, Karnataka and Telangana and also in Andhra Pradesh and northern parts of Madhya Pradesh and Gujarat, Goa whose family received it as a title.

== Etymology ==
In Sanskrit, Deśa means land, country and mukha means head or chief; thus, deshmukh means "the head" of a district.

== Deshmukh as a title ==
=== Local office ===
Deshmukh was a historical title given to a person who was granted a territory of land, in Maharashtra, Karnataka, Telangana, Andhra Pradesh and Chhattisgarh. The granted territory was usually referred to as the Dēśamukhi. The Deshmukh was in effect the ruler of the territory, as he was entitled to a portion of the collected taxes. It was also his duty to maintain the basic services in the territory, such as police and judicial duties. It was typically a hereditary system. The title of Deshmukh provided the titled family with revenues from the area and the responsibilities to keep the orders.

For instance, while Marathas & Dhangar with the title Deshmukh are often (Kshatriyas), as it was a title conferred upon rulers of a in the Deccan region. While a person holding the title could be of Kshatriya Maratha & Dhangar descent, the title itself was not exclusive to them, This surname is also found among other communities.

The Deshmukh system was abolished after the independence of India in 1947, when the government confiscated most of the land of the Deshmukhs. Some families, however, maintain their status as real estate barons, most notably in Mumbai, with holdover properties that were not taken away.

It was similar in many respects to the Zamindar and Jagir systems in India, and can be considered as a feudal system. Typically taxes collected were to be distributed fairly, and occasionally Deshmukhs participated in Vedic rituals in which they redistributed all material possessions to the people. However, the title Deshmukh should not be associated to a particular religion or caste. Deshmukhis were granted by the Deccan sultanates, Mughal emperors, Nizams of Hyderabad and other Muslim rulers and by Maratha emperors (Chhatrapatis) to Marathas, Dhangars, Kolis Reddys, Deshastha Brahmins, Chandraseniya Kayastha Prabhus, Chitpavan Brahmins, Lingayats, Jains and Muslims.

- During the rule of Qutb-shahis of Golkonda majority of Deshmukhs and Sir-Deshmukhs were Deshastha Brahmins of Madhwa Section. But, later many of these Deshmukhs became Zamindars and Jagirdars during British rule.
- In Andhra Pradesh, especially in the Guntur, Krishna, Nellore and Kurnool districts, the title "Deshmukh" was used by Kamma and Deshastha Brahmin zamindars.
- In North Karnataka many parganas were granted to Deshastha Brahmins, Lingayat Vanis and were made Deshmukhs by Sultanate of Bijapur.
- In Telangana many Jagirdars of Reddy, Deshastha Brahmin and Velama families were given the title "Deshmukh" by the Nizam of Hyderabad.

Inukonda Thirumali of Telangana describes the role of Deshmukhs:

They were primarily revenue collectors; and when (magisterial and judicial) responsibilities were added to their function they became Deshmukhs, chiefs of the parganas. Gradually, each of these assignments tended to become a watan i.e., hereditary lease. Despite changes in the political authority at the top, this institution survived, since no ruler from above wished to risk disturbing local administration, headed by village officials. This institution was deeply entrenched in the region with local support and structured in organized 'community' life. The Deshmukh presided over meetings of the pargana community known as 'got sahba' [sic]^{['got sabha']} which decided and confirmed claims over inheritance, purchase, and transfer of waters. The Deshmukh by virtue of local sanction and consensus could not be easily displaced from above.

Barry Pavier describes Deshmukhs:

These were, in the 1940s, the layer of the very large landowners in Telangana. They owned from 2,000 to 3,000 acres at the lower end to 160,000 acres (650 km^{2}) at the upper scale. The reforms abandoned the previous practice, of auctioning off the revenue collection in the government-administered areas to farmers, in favour of direct revenue collection by the State. The 'revenue farmers' were given land in compensation. Most of them availed of the opportunity to seize as much of the best land as they could. They also received a pension. The Deshmukhs were thus given a dominant position in the rural economy which they proceeded resolutely to strengthen during the succeeding decades.

Writing in the nineteenth century, Major W. H. Skyes, the statistical reporter to the Government of Bombay, described the Deshmukh:

The Desmukhs were, no doubt, originally appointed by Government, and they possessed all the above advantages, on the tenure of collecting and being responsible for the revenue, for superintending the cultivation and police of their districts, and carrying into effect all orders of Government. They were, in fact, to a district what a Patil is to a village; in short, were charged with its whole Government.

== Notables ==
- Nanaji Deshmukh (Deshasth Brahmin), Indian social activist, founder of Bharatiya Jana Sangh Party, MP of BJP; Bharat Ratna.
- Pranawachandra Deshmukh (Deshasth Brahmin), Indian physicist(Atomic Physicist) and educator
- Ganpatrao Deshmukh (Dhangar), Indian politician (Sangola, Solapur)
- Gopal Hari Deshmukh (Chitpavan Brahmin), Indian writer and social reformer best known for his Lokhitwadinchi Shatapatre.
- C. D. Deshmukh (Chandraseniya Kayasth Prabhu), Indian economist, former governor of Reserve Bank of India and former Finance Minister in the Union Cabinet.
- Durgabai Deshmukh (Telugu Vaidiki Brahmin, by marriage a Chandraseniya Kayasth Prabhu), Indian freedom fighter, lawyer, social worker and politician, wife of C.D. Deshmukh and founder of Andhra Mahila Sabha.
- Gopalrao Bajirao Khedkar Deshmukh (Deshmukh Maratha), Indian politician, first President of the Maharashtra Pradesh Congress Committee.
- Ramrao Deshmukh (Marathi: रामराव माधवराव देश्मुख) (Deshmukh Maratha), Indian political and academic personality from Amravati, Maharashtra.
- Babasaheb Deshmukh Pawrekar (96 Kuli Maratha), philanthropist.
- Panjabrao Deshmukh (Deshmukh Maratha), Indian social and political leader, founder of Shivaji Education Society and Minister of Agriculture in Jawaharlal Nehru cabinet.
- B. G. Deshmukh (1929–2011) (Chandraseniya Kayasth Prabhu), former cabinet secretary and principal secretary to three prime ministers of India (Rajiv Gandhi, VP Singh and Chandrashekhar).
- B. N. Deshmukh (Chandraseniya Kayasth Prabhu), Indian politician and Justice of Bombay High Court.
- Sheshrao Deshmukh (Jain Chaturth), Indian politician.
- Vilasrao Deshmukh (96 Kuli Maratha), former chief minister of Maharashtra.
- Shivajirao Shankarrao Deshmukh (Jain Chaturth), Indian politician and Member of Parliament of Parbhani
- Diliprao Deshmukh (born 1950) (96 Kuli Maratha), Indian politician and former minister in state Government of Maharashtra.
- Vijay Deshmukh (Lingayat Wani), Maharashtra state Minister from Solapur.
- Amit Deshmukh (born 1976) (96 Kuli Maratha), Indian politician based in Latur and Minister in Government of Maharashtra.
- Riteish Deshmukh (96 Kuli Maratha), Hindi film actor; son of Vilasrao Deshmukh.
- Shivajirao Deshmukh (Maratha), former chairman of Maharashtra Legislative Council.
- Dhiraj Deshmukh (born 1980) (96 Kuli Maratha), Indian politician from Marathwada region and member of Maharashtra Legislative Assembly.
- Anil Deshmukh (Deshmukh Maratha), Indian politician, former Home Minister of Maharashtra from NCP.
- Babasaheb deshmukh (Dhangar) Indian Politician
- Subhash Deshmukh (96 Kuli Maratha), Indian politician, former Cabinet Minister of Maharashtra.
- Sandhya Shantaram (née Vijaya Deshmukh) (Chitpavan Brahmin), Indian actress.
- Ranjana Deshmukh (Chitpavan Brahmin), Indian Marathi actress.
- Sunil Deshmukh (Deshmukh Maratha), Indian politician, Member of Legislative Assembly.

== See also ==
- Maratha
- Kshatriya
- Maratha clan system
- Maratha titles
- List of Maratha dynasties and states

== Bibliography ==
- Dora and Gadi: Manifestation of Landlord Domination in Telangana, I. Thirumali, Economic and Political Weekly, Vol. 27, No. 9 (Feb. 29, 1992), pp. 477–482
- Telangana Movement Revisited, K. Balagopal, Economic and Political Weekly, Vol. 18, No. 18 (Apr. 30, 1983), pp. 709–712
- The Imperial Crisis in the Deccan, J. F. Richards, The Journal of Asian Studies, Vol. 35, No. 2 (Feb., 1976), pp. 237–256
- The Telangana Armed Struggle, Barry Pavier, Economic and Political Weekly, Vol. 9, No. 32/34, Special Number (Aug., 1974), pp. 1413+1417-1420
- Anatomy of Rebellion, Claude Emerson Welch, SUNY Press, 1980 ISBN 0-87395-441-6, ISBN 978-0-87395-441-9
- Report of Land Tenures of the Dekkan, by Major W. H. Skyes, Statistical Reporter to the Government of Bombay, Chapter VII pg9, Parliamentary Papers, Great Britain Parliament, House of Commons, HMSO 1866
- Indian Village, S. C. Dube, Morris Edward Opler, Routledge, 2003, pp. 45
- The Landed Gentry of the Telangana, Andhra Pradesh, Hugh Gray in Elites in South Asia, eds Edmund Leach and S.N. Mukherjee, Cambridge University Press, 1970
- Telangana People's Struggle and Its Lessons, P. Sundarayya, Foundation Books, 2006
