= Meena Warpudkar =

Indian politician

Meena Suresh Warpudkar

Mayor of Parbhani Municipal Corporation
- In office 15 May 2017 – 22 November 2019
- Preceded by: Sangeeta Wadkar (NCP)
- Succeeded by: Anita Sonkamble (INC)

Personal details
- Party: Bharatiya Janata Party
- Spouse: Suresh Warpudkar (m. 1974)
- Children: 1 son, 2 daughters
- Occupation: Social work

Meena Warpudkar is an Indian politician of Bharatiya Janata Party from Parbhani, Maharashtra, India. She was Mayor of Parbhani Municipal Corporation.

== Personal life ==
Meenatai Warpudkar married Suresh Warpudkar on 29 June 1974. The couple have one son and two daughters. her husband is five time MLA and a former minister of state of Government of Maharashtra currently representing Pathri (Vidhan Sabha constituency) in Maharashtra Legislative Assembly.

== Political career ==
Meenatai Warpudkar started her political career as Indian National Congress corporator of Parbhani Municipal Corporation. she was elected as mayor of Parbhani Municipal Corporation on 15 May 2017. She received 40 votes in favour while her rival Alia Anjum got 18 votes in house.
