= Rajesh Vitekar =

Indian politician

Member of the Maharashtra Legislative Assembly
- Incumbent
- Assumed office 23 November 2024
- Preceded by: Suresh Warpudkar
- Constituency: Pathri

Member of the Maharashtra Legislative Council
- In office 28 Jul 2024 – 23 November 2024
- Succeeded by: Sanjay Khodke
- Constituency: Elected by MLAs

Personal details
- Born: Rajesh Uttamrao Vitekar; March 27, 1980 (age 46)
- Party: Nationalist Congress Party (Ajit Pawar)
- Parent: Uttamrao Abaji Vitekar (Father)

Rajesh Uttamrao Vitekar (born 1980) is a politician belonging to the Nationalist Congress Party. He was elected as member of the Maharashtra Legislative Assembly in 2024 Maharashtra Legislative Assembly election from Pathri Assembly constituency.

== Early life and education ==
Vitekar is from Pathri, Parbhani district, Maharashtra. He is the son of Ex-MLA Uttamrao Abaji Vitekar, a farmer.

- He did his BSc at Vasant College, Kej in 2006. Earlier, he completed his HSC at Subhash Chandrabose Secondary and Higher Secondary School in 1999. He completed his SSC at Shri Saraswati New English School Public School, Ambajogai, in 1997.

== Career ==
Vitekar was elected to the Maharashtra Legislative Council in July 2024. Earlier, he won from Pathri Assembly constituency representing the Nationalist Congress Party in the 2024 Maharashtra Legislative Assembly election. He polled 83,767 votes and defeated his nearest rival, Suresh Warpudkar of the Indian National Congress by a margin of 13,244 votes.

- In 2019, he contested from Parbhani Lok Sabha constituency, but lost to Sanjay Jadhav of Shiv Sena (UBT) by a margin of 134,061 votes.
