= Ashokrao Deshmukh =

Indian politician

Member of Parliament, Lok Sabha
- In office 1989-1996
- Preceded by: Ramrao Narayanrao Yadav
- Succeeded by: Suresh Jadhav
- Constituency: Parbhani

Personal details
- Born: 26 January 1952 (age 74) Parbhani, Bombay State
- Party: Shiv Sena
- Spouse: Laxmi
- Children: 1 son and daughter

Ashokrao Anandrao Deshmukh (born 26 January 1952) is a former Indian politician. He was elected to the Lok Sabha, lower house of the Parliament of India from Parbhani, Maharashtra as a member of the Shiv Sena.
