= Opera House Assembly constituency =

Constituency of the Maharashtra Legislative Assembly

Coordinates: 18.955°N 72.817°E

Opera House
- Former constituency for the Maharashtra Legislative Assembly

Constituency details
- Country: India
- Region: Western India
- State: Maharashtra
- Lok Sabha constituency: Mumbai South
- Established: 1951
- Abolished: 2008

Opera House Vidhan Sabha constituency was one of the 288 constituencies in the Maharashtra Legislative Assembly from Mumbai area, in India. The constituency existed until the 2004 elections and was part of Mumbai South Lok Sabha constituency. It became defunct after the constituency map was redrawn.

== Members of Vidhan Sabha ==
Year	Member	Party
1978	Jayawantiben Mehta	Janata Party
1980	Jayawantiben Mehta	Bharatiya Janata Party
1985	Chandrashekhar Prabhu	Indian National Congress
1990	Chandrakant Padwal	Shiv Sena
1995	Chandrakant Padwal	Shiv Sena
1999	Chandrakant Padwal	Shiv Sena
2004	Arvind Nerkar	Shiv Sena
2008 onwards : Constituency defunct

== Election results ==
=== Assembly Election 2004 ===
2004 Maharashtra Legislative Assembly election : Opera House
Party	Candidate	Votes	%	±%
SS	Arvinda Nerkar	24,968	56.54%	▲5.81
INC	Kisan Jadhav	17,948	40.65%	▲0.20
SP	Ketan Arun Kadm	854	1.93%	New
BSP	Joseph Bavatis Rodriques	386	0.87%	New
Margin of victory		7,020	15.90%	▲5.60
Turnout		44,156	48.32%	▲2.17
Total valid votes		44,156		
Registered electors		91,377		▼4.34
SS hold		Swing	▲5.81	

=== Assembly Election 1999 ===
1999 Maharashtra Legislative Assembly election : Opera House
Party	Candidate	Votes	%	±%
SS	Chandrakant Shankar Padwal	22,363	50.74%	▼13.33
INC	Kisan Baburao Jadhav	17,826	40.44%	▲9.39
NCP	Rajendra Raju Maganlal Merchant	3,424	7.77%	New
Independent	Thakur Vasant Krishna Advocate	463	1.05%	New
Margin of victory		4,537	10.29%	▼22.73
Turnout		44,082	46.15%	▼13.83
Total valid votes		44,076		
Registered electors		95,522		▲1.06
SS hold		Swing	▼13.33	

=== Assembly Election 1995 ===
1995 Maharashtra Legislative Assembly election : Opera House
Party	Candidate	Votes	%	±%
SS	Chandrakant Shankar Padwal	36,321	64.07%	▲11.38
INC	Sujata Dhawale	17,602	31.05%	▼4.76
Independent	Dinesh Panchal	1,089	1.92%	New
Independent	Sudhakar Keshav Sawant	687	1.21%	New
Independent	Sukri Habib Abdulkader	477	0.84%	New
Independent	Devji Jethalal Charla	409	0.72%	New
Margin of victory		18,719	33.02%	▲16.14
Turnout		57,483	60.82%	▲5.33
Total valid votes		56,691		
Registered electors		94,518		▼8.54
SS hold		Swing	▲11.38	

=== Assembly Election 1990 ===
1990 Maharashtra Legislative Assembly election : Opera House
Party	Candidate	Votes	%	±%
SS	Chandrakant Shankar Padwal	29,757	52.69%	New
INC	Prabhu Chandrashekhar	20,222	35.81%	▼10.18
JD	Solanki Avinash Mithalal	5,812	10.29%	New
Margin of victory		9,535	16.88%	▼1.33
Turnout		56,920	55.08%	▲6.40
Total valid votes		56,477		
Registered electors		1,03,343		▼0.02
SS gain from INC		Swing	▲6.70	

=== Assembly Election 1985 ===
1985 Maharashtra Legislative Assembly election : Opera House
Party	Candidate	Votes	%	±%
INC	Chandrashekhar Prabhu	22,934	45.98%	New
Independent	Gajanan Damodar Vartak	13,850	27.77%	New
BJP	Kirit Somaiya	11,910	23.88%	▼37.45
Independent	Shantaram S. Brid	869	1.74%	New
Margin of victory		9,084	18.21%	▼5.32
Turnout		50,315	48.68%	▲11.33
Total valid votes		49,873		
Registered electors		1,03,368		▼2.93
INC gain from BJP		Swing	▼15.35	

=== Assembly Election 1980 ===
1980 Maharashtra Legislative Assembly election : Opera House
Party	Candidate	Votes	%	±%
BJP	Jayawantiben Navinchandra Mehta	24,113	61.33%	New
INC(I)	Brid Shantaram Sakharam	14,861	37.80%	▲32.81
Independent	Nagare Bhaskar Bhikaji	341	0.87%	New
Margin of victory		9,252	23.53%	▼14.26
Turnout		39,646	37.23%	▼28.46
Total valid votes		39,315		
Registered electors		1,06,491		▼2.03
BJP gain from JP		Swing	▼0.05	

=== Assembly Election 1978 ===
1978 Maharashtra Legislative Assembly election : Opera House
Party	Candidate	Votes	%	±%
JP	Jayawantiben Navinchandra Mehta	43,625	61.38%	New
SS	Pramod Navalkar	16,768	23.59%	New
INC	Ankleshwaria Ramanlal Chhotalal	7,128	10.03%	New
INC(I)	P. N. Shah	3,547	4.99%	New
Margin of victory		26,857	37.79%	
Turnout		71,994	66.23%	
Total valid votes		71,068		
Registered electors		1,08,701		
JP win (new seat)				

== See also ==
- South Mumbai
- Mumbai City district
- List of constituencies of Maharashtra Legislative Assembly
