= Parbhani Lok Sabha constituency =

Lok Sabha Constituency in Maharashtra

Coordinates: 19.3°N 76.8°E

Parbhani Lok Sabha
- Lok Sabha constituency
- Parbhani Lok Sabha Constituency map

Constituency details
- Country: India
- Region: Western India
- State: Maharashtra
- Assembly constituencies: Jintur; Parbhani; Gangakhed; Pathri; Partur; Ghansawangi
- Established: 1952
- Reservation: None

Member of Parliament
- 18th Lok Sabha
- Incumbent Sanjay Jadhav
- Party: SHS
- Alliance: NDA
- Elected year: 2024
- Preceded by: Ganeshrao Dudhgaonkar

Parbhani Lok Sabha constituency is one of the 48 Lok Sabha (Parliamentary) constituencies in Maharashtra state in western India. This constituency covers the entire Parbhani district and a part of Jalna district.

== Vidhan Sabha segments ==
At present, Parbhani (परभणी) Lok Sabha constituency comprises six Vidhan Sabha (legislative assembly) segments. These segments are:

#	Name	District	Member	Party	Leading (in 2024)
95	Jintur	Parbhani	Meghana Bordikar	BJP	SS(UBT)
96	Parbhani	Parbhani	Rahul Patil	SS(UBT)	SS(UBT)
97	Gangakhed	Parbhani	Ratnakar Gutte	RSPS	RSPS
98	Pathri	Parbhani	Rajesh Vitekar	NCP	SS(UBT)
99	Partur	Jalna	Babanrao Lonikar	BJP	SS(UBT)
100	Ghansawangi	Jalna	Hikmat Udhan	SHS	SS(UBT)

== Members of Parliament ==
Year	Name	Party
1952	Narayanrao Waghmare	Peasants and Workers Party of India
1957	Nagorao Pangarkar	Indian National Congress
1957	Ramrao Yadav	Indian National Congress
1962	Shivajirao Deshmukh	Indian National Congress
1967	Shivajirao Deshmukh	Indian National Congress
1971	Shivajirao Deshmukh	Indian National Congress
1977	Sheshrao Deshmukh	Peasants and Workers Party of India
1980	Ramrao Yadav	Indian National Congress
1984	Ramrao Yadav	Indian National Congress
1989	Ashokrao Deshmukh	Independent politician
1991	Ashokrao Deshmukh	Shiv Sena
1996	Suresh Ramrao Jadhav	Shiv Sena
1998	Suresh Warpudkar	Indian National Congress
1999	Suresh Ramrao Jadhav	Shiv Sena
2004	Tukaram Renge Patil	Shiv Sena
2009	Ganeshrao Raut Dudhgaonkar	Shiv Sena
2014	Sanjay Jadhav	Shiv Sena
2019	Sanjay Jadhav	Shiv Sena
2024	Sanjay Jadhav	Shiv Sena (Uddhav Balasaheb Thackeray)

== Election results ==
=== 2024 ===
2024 Indian general elections: Parbhani
Party	Candidate	Votes	%	±%
SS(UBT)	Sanjay Haribhau Jadhav	601,343	45.17	New
RSPS	Mahadev Jankar	4,67,282	35.10	N/A
VBA	Panjabrao Dakh	95,967	7.21	▼4.76
NOTA	None of the Above	3,385	0.25	▼0.11
Majority		1,34,061	10.07	▼6.70
Turnout		13,31,176	62.70	▼0.42
SS(UBT) gain from SS		Swing		

=== 2019 ===
2019 Indian general elections: Parbhani
Party	Candidate	Votes	%	±%
SS	Sanjay Haribhau Jadhav	538,941	43.02	−6.75
NCP	Rajesh Vitekar	4,96,742	39.65	+0.82
VBA	Alamgir Mohammed Khan	1,49,946	11.97	
CPI	Comrade Rajan Kshirsagar	17,095	1.36	
NOTA	None of the Above	4,550	0.36	
Majority		42,199	3.37	−7.57
Turnout		12,53,092	63.12	−1.32
SS hold		Swing		

=== General elections 2014 ===
2014 Indian general elections: Parbhani
Party	Candidate	Votes	%	±%
SS	Sanjay Haribhau Jadhav	578,455	49.77	
NCP	Vijay Manikrao Bhamble	4,51,300	38.83	
BSP	Gulmir Khan	33,716	2.90	
NOTA	None of the Above	17,502	1.51	
CPI	Comrade Rajan Kshirsagar	12,404	1.07	
Majority		1,27,155	10.94	
Turnout		11,62,371	64.44	
SS hold		Swing		

=== General elections 2009 ===
2009 Indian general elections: Parbhani
Party	Candidate	Votes	%	±%
SS	Ganeshrao Dudhgaonkar	385,387	44.26	
NCP	Suresh Warpudkar	3,19,000	36.75	
BSP	Rajshri Jamage	64,611	7.42	
RSPS	Mule Baban Dattarao	11,861	1.36	
Majority		65,418	7.51	
Turnout		8,70,726	54.08	
SS gain from NCP		Swing		

=== General elections 2004 ===
2004 Indian general election: Parbhani
Party	Candidate	Votes	%	±%
SS	Tukaram Ganpatrao Renge Patil	339,318	50.20	
NCP	Suresh Warpudkar	2,83,147	41.90	
SP	Gaffar Master	17,736	2.62	
Independent	Sonwane Rajesh Namdev	17,083	2.53	
Majority		56,171	8.32	
Turnout		6,75,417	58.44	
SS gain from NCP		Swing		

=== General elections 1999 ===
1999 Indian general election: Parbhani
Party	Candidate	Votes	%	±%
SS	Suresh Ramrao Jadhav (Patil)	254,019	38.39	
INC	Raosaheb Bapusaheb Jamkar	2,10,354	31.79	
NCP	Suresh Warpudkar	1,79,443	27.12	
Independent (politician)	Govind Dhondopant Chatorikar Guruji	7,140	1.08	
Independent (politician)	Noorjahan Begum Rahemankhan	3,780	0.57	
Majority		43,665	6.61	
Turnout		6,61,632	62.70	
SS gain from INC		Swing		

=== General elections 1998 ===
1998 Indian general election: Parbhani
Party	Candidate	Votes	%	±%
INC	Suresh Warpudkar	320,415	52.69	
SS	Suresh Ramrao Jadhav (Patil)	2,74,922	45.21	
AD(K)	Kishanrao Janardhanrao More	7,123	1.17	
Independent (politician)	Dr Bharati Murkute (Ghuge)	4,045	0.67	
Independent (politician)	Shrinivas Dinkar Kulkarni	1,595	0.26	
Majority		45,493	7.48	
Turnout		6,08,100	59.74	
INC gain from SS		Swing		

=== General elections 1996 ===
1996 Indian general election: Parbhani
Party	Candidate	Votes	%	±%
SS	Suresh Ramrao Jadhav	230,762	46.6	
INC	Ashok Anand Rao Deshmukh	115,887	23.4	
SP	Rajesh Sahebrao Patil	55,407	11.2	
Independent (politician)	Raut Dudhgaonkar	31,674	6.4	
Majority		114,875	23.2	
Turnout		4,94,696	48.6	
SS gain from INC		Swing		

== See also ==
- Parbhani district
- Jalna district
- List of constituencies of the Lok Sabha
