= Pathri Assembly constituency =

Constituency of the Maharashtra legislative assembly in India

Coordinates: 19°15′35.68″N 76°25′12.92″E

Pathri
- Constituency No. 98 for the Maharashtra Legislative Assembly

Constituency details
- Country: India
- Region: Western India
- State: Maharashtra
- District: Parbhani
- Lok Sabha constituency: Parbhani
- Established: 1951
- Total electors: 393,392
- Reservation: None

Member of Legislative Assembly
- 15th Maharashtra Legislative Assembly
- Incumbent Rajesh Vitekar
- Party: NCP
- Alliance: NDA
- Elected year: 2024

Pathri Assembly constituency is one of four constituencies of the Maharashtra Vidhan Sabha located in Parbhani district.

It is a part of the Parbhani Lok Sabha constituency along with five other assembly constituencies, viz Jintur, Parbhani and Gangakhed from Parbhani district and Partur and Ghanasawangi from Jalna district.

Along with whole Pathri taluka, Pathri Assembly constituency also includes whole of Manwath and Sonpeth taluka's & Parbhani Taluka's 42 villages.

The representative from this constituency in the Maharashtra state assembly from 2014 to 2019 was Mohan Fad who was an independent candidate.

== Members of the Legislative Assembly ==
Year	Member	Party
1952	Ram Rao Balkishan Rao	Indian National Congress
1962	Babarao Sopan Naik	Peasants and Workers Party of India
1967	Sakhram Gopalrao Nakhate	Indian National Congress
1972	Sakhram Gopalrao Nakhate	Indian National Congress
1978	Sakhram Gopalrao Nakhate	Indian National Congress
1980	Dagduba Balaji Zodgaonkar	Indian National Congress
1985	Digamberrao Sahebrao Wadiker	Indian Congress
1990	Haribhau Vitthalrao Lahane	Shiv Sena
1995	Haribhau Vitthalrao Lahane	Shiv Sena
1999	Haribhau Vitthalrao Lahane	Shiv Sena
2004	Abdullah "Babajani" Khan Durrani	Nationalist Congress Party
2009	Mira Renge	Shiv Sena
2014	Mohan Fad	Independent politician
2019	Suresh Warpudkar	Indian National Congress
2024	Rajesh Vitekar	Nationalist Congress Party

== Election results ==
=== Assembly Election 2024 ===
2024 Maharashtra Legislative Assembly election : Pathri
Party	Candidate	Votes	%	±%
NCP	Rajesh Vitekar	83,767	29.94%	New
INC	Suresh Warpudkar	70,523	25.21%	▼19.81
RSPS	Saeed Khan	54,647	19.53%	New
Independent	Abdullah Khan Durrani (Babajani Durrani)	48,257	17.25%	New
Independent	Madhavrao Tukaram Phad	10,544	3.77%	New
VBA	Engg. Suresh Kisanrao Phad	5,415	1.94%	▼7.33
NOTA	None of the above	1,657	0.59%	▼0.13
Margin of victory		13,244	4.73%	▼1.57
Turnout		281,445	71.54%	▲4.74
Total valid votes		279,788		
Registered electors		393,392		▲11.16
Nationalist Congress Party (post–2023) gain from INC		Swing	▼15.08	

=== Assembly Election 2019 ===
2019 Maharashtra Legislative Assembly election : Pathri
Party	Candidate	Votes	%	±%
INC	Suresh Warpudkar	105,625	45.02%	▲21.06
BJP	Mohan Madhavrao Phad	90,851	38.72%	New
VBA	Vilas Saheb Babar	21,744	9.27%	New
Independent	Dr. Jagdish Balasaheb Shinde	8,551	3.64%	New
Ambedkarist Republican Party	Ajay Sadashiv Solanke	1,771	0.75%	New
NOTA	None of the above	1,696	0.72%	▼0.05
BSP	Gautam Vaijnathrao Ujgare	1,515	0.65%	New
Margin of victory		14,774	6.30%	▲0.51
Turnout		236,412	66.80%	▼3.39
Total valid votes		234,634		
Registered electors		353,895		▲6.09
INC gain from Independent		Swing	▲15.27	

=== Assembly Election 2014 ===
2014 Maharashtra Legislative Assembly election : Pathri
Party	Candidate	Votes	%	±%
Independent	Mohan Fad	69,081	29.75%	New
INC	Suresh Warpudkar	55,632	23.96%	New
NCP	Abdullah "Babajani" Khan Durrani	46,304	19.94%	▼20.68
SS	Mira Renge	35,408	15.25%	▼31.11
CPI(M)	Com. Vilas Sahebrao Babar	5,517	2.38%	New
MNS	Haribhau Vitthalrao Lahane	5,509	2.37%	New
BBM	Arjun Ramrao Sable Bhogaokar	2,636	1.14%	▼0.47
SWP	Sitafale Vijaykumar Tulshiram	2,400	1.03%	New
NOTA	None of the above	1,788	0.77%	New
Margin of victory		13,449	5.79%	▲0.05
Turnout		234,133	70.19%	▲5.70
Total valid votes		232,177		
Registered electors		333,594		▲11.98
Independent gain from SS		Swing	▼16.61	

=== Assembly Election 2009 ===
2009 Maharashtra Legislative Assembly election : Pathri
Party	Candidate	Votes	%	±%
SS	Mira Renge	89,056	46.36%	▲13.09
NCP	Abdullah "Babajani" Khan Durrani	78,031	40.62%	▲2.38
RSPS	Thore Vishwanath Manohar	6,475	3.37%	New
BSP	Saifoddin Sarafarajoddin Faroki	3,827	1.99%	▲0.65
Independent	Shaikh Budhan Sk. Gulab Atar	3,525	1.83%	New
BBM	Sontakke Bandu Alias Dhammapal Rambhau	3,099	1.61%	New
Independent	Jadhav Suresh Ramrao	1,410	0.73%	New
Margin of victory		11,025	5.74%	▲0.77
Turnout		192,116	64.49%	▼7.77
Total valid votes		192,115		
Registered electors		297,910		▲65.28
SS gain from NCP		Swing	▲8.12	

=== Assembly Election 2004 ===
2004 Maharashtra Legislative Assembly election : Pathri
Party	Candidate	Votes	%	±%
NCP	Abdullah "Babajani" Khan Durrani	49,801	38.24%	▲6.04
SS	Haribhau Vitthalrao Lahane	43,331	33.27%	▼5.79
Independent	Mukeshrao Borade	26,632	20.45%	New
CPI(M)	Shere Patil Ramkrishna Dagdoba	2,183	1.68%	New
Independent	Shamkuwar Shantabai Manoharrao	2,062	1.58%	New
BSP	Prof. Sudam Marotrao Chinchane	1,742	1.34%	New
Independent	Sharma Harikishan Ramprasad	810	0.62%	New
Margin of victory		6,470	4.97%	▼1.89
Turnout		130,245	72.26%	▲0.85
Total valid votes		130,241		
Registered electors		180,245		▲20.01
NCP gain from SS		Swing	▼0.82	

=== Assembly Election 1999 ===
1999 Maharashtra Legislative Assembly election : Pathri
Party	Candidate	Votes	%	±%
SS	Haribhau Vitthalrao Lahane	39,242	39.06%	▼0.15
NCP	Abdullah "Babajani" Khan Durrani	32,351	32.20%	New
INC	Nakhate Anil Sakharamji	26,500	26.38%	▲3.61
Independent	Kedar Saenath Vithal	1,449	1.44%	New
Margin of victory		6,891	6.86%	▼9.59
Turnout		107,251	71.41%	▼3.93
Total valid votes		100,467		
Registered electors		150,193		▲0.71
SS hold		Swing	▼0.15	

=== Assembly Election 1995 ===
1995 Maharashtra Legislative Assembly election : Pathri
Party	Candidate	Votes	%	±%
SS	Haribhau Vitthalrao Lahane	42,598	39.21%	▼3.62
INC	Uttamrao Ranganathrao Raner	24,733	22.77%	▼3.22
BBM	Abdullah "Babajani" Khan Durrani	21,735	20.01%	New
Independent	Govind Vithalrao Joshi	11,125	10.24%	New
CPI(M)	Kshirsagar Rajan Ramchandra	3,968	3.65%	New
Hindustan Janta Party	Kulkarni Madhavrao Bhagwanrao	2,070	1.91%	New
Independent	Thore Vishwanath Manohar	937	0.86%	New
Margin of victory		17,865	16.45%	▼0.39
Turnout		112,358	75.34%	▲12.74
Total valid votes		108,634		
Registered electors		149,139		▲4.32
SS hold		Swing	▼3.62	

=== Assembly Election 1990 ===
1990 Maharashtra Legislative Assembly election : Pathri
Party	Candidate	Votes	%	±%
SS	Haribhau Vitthalrao Lahane	37,437	42.83%	New
INC	Ganeshrao Dudhgaonkar	22,720	25.99%	▼15.05
Independent	Uttamrao Ranganathrao Raner	20,472	23.42%	New
PWPI	Raosaheb Shankerrao Wagh	3,322	3.80%	New
Independent	Madhavrao Bhagwanrao Kulkarni	1,281	1.47%	New
BSP	Kamble Balkrishna Shankerrao	838	0.96%	New
Margin of victory		14,717	16.84%	▲12.27
Turnout		89,494	62.60%	▲13.03
Total valid votes		87,409		
Registered electors		142,969		▲31.03
SS gain from IC(S)		Swing	▼2.79	

=== Assembly Election 1985 ===
1985 Maharashtra Legislative Assembly election : Pathri
Party	Candidate	Votes	%	±%
IC(S)	Wadiker Digamberrao Sahebrao	24,011	45.62%	New
INC	Dakh Baba Saheb Marotrao	21,603	41.04%	New
Independent	Bansode Laxman Punjaji	2,481	4.71%	New
Independent	Kamble Marotrao Namdeorao	1,840	3.50%	New
Independent	Loya Kedarnath Motilal	944	1.79%	New
Independent	Kulkarni Madhavrao Bhagwanrao	614	1.17%	New
Independent	Dhapse Piraji Sayaji	523	0.99%	New
Independent	Shaikh Ahmed Shaikh Abdulla	457	0.87%	New
Margin of victory		2,408	4.57%	▼13.28
Turnout		54,086	49.57%	▼8.58
Total valid votes		52,635		
Registered electors		109,112		▲7.41
IC(S) gain from INC(U)		Swing	▼7.68	

=== Assembly Election 1980 ===
1980 Maharashtra Legislative Assembly election : Pathri
Party	Candidate	Votes	%	±%
INC(U)	Zodgaonkar Dagduba Balaji	30,442	53.30%	New
INC(I)	Sakhram Gopalrao Nakhate	20,246	35.45%	▲10.75
PWPI	Wagh Raosdaheb Shankerrao	4,397	7.70%	▼13.14
Independent	Kamble Marotrao Namdeorao	1,761	3.08%	New
Margin of victory		10,196	17.85%	▲14.75
Turnout		59,067	58.15%	▼1.03
Total valid votes		57,111		
Registered electors		101,580		▲10.26
INC(U) gain from INC		Swing	▲25.51	

=== Assembly Election 1978 ===
1978 Maharashtra Legislative Assembly election : Pathri
Party	Candidate	Votes	%	±%
INC	Sakhram Gopalrao Nakhate	14,455	27.79%	▼20.93
INC(I)	Dakh Baba Saheb Marotrao	12,845	24.70%	New
PWPI	Naik Babarao Sopanrao	10,839	20.84%	▼21.23
JP	Kalegaonkar Govindrao Baburao	9,346	17.97%	New
Independent	Dhawle Sitaram Ramji	2,931	5.64%	New
Independent	Kadam Janardhanrao Baliram	1,240	2.38%	New
Independent	Phulari Narharrao Gunderao	352	0.68%	New
Margin of victory		1,610	3.10%	▼3.55
Turnout		54,522	59.18%	▲11.63
Total valid votes		52,008		
Registered electors		92,130		▼9.54
INC hold		Swing	▼20.93	

=== Assembly Election 1972 ===
1972 Maharashtra Legislative Assembly election : Pathri
Party	Candidate	Votes	%	±%
INC	Sakhram Gopalrao Nakhate	22,584	48.72%	▼11.84
PWPI	Naik Babarao Sopanrao	19,503	42.07%	▲12.28
CPI	Devkinandan Deoda	3,024	6.52%	New
RPI	Dhole Tulshiram Ganpatrao	1,248	2.69%	New
Margin of victory		3,081	6.65%	▼24.13
Turnout		48,432	47.55%	▼5.16
Total valid votes		46,359		
Registered electors		101,849		▲11.77
INC hold		Swing	▼11.84	

=== Assembly Election 1967 ===
1967 Maharashtra Legislative Assembly election : Pathri
Party	Candidate	Votes	%	±%
INC	Sakhram Gopalrao Nakhate	26,669	60.56%	▲16.03
PWPI	Babarao Sopan Naik	13,116	29.79%	▼15.20
Independent	S. Dagadya	2,999	6.81%	New
Independent	G. P. Shingare	1,250	2.84%	New
Margin of victory		13,553	30.78%	▲30.32
Turnout		48,032	52.71%	▲11.11
Total valid votes		44,034		
Registered electors		91,126		▲16.57
INC gain from PWPI		Swing	▲15.57	

=== Assembly Election 1962 ===
1962 Maharashtra Legislative Assembly election : Pathri
Party	Candidate	Votes	%	±%
PWPI	Babarao Sopan Naik	13,758	44.99%	▲1.94
INC	Sakhram Gopalrao Nakhate	13,616	44.53%	▼3.17
Independent	Rajaram Vithal	3,204	10.48%	New
Margin of victory		142	0.46%	▼4.19
Turnout		32,521	41.60%	▲13.28
Total valid votes		30,578		
Registered electors		78,170		▲32.04
PWPI gain from INC		Swing	▼2.71	

=== Assembly Election 1952 ===
1952 Hyderabad State Legislative Assembly election : Pathri
Party	Candidate	Votes	%	±%
INC	Ram Rao Balkishan Rao	7,998	47.70%	New
PWPI	Pandit Rao Hemraj	7,219	43.05%	New
Independent	Gopinath Rao Ram Rao	1,011	6.03%	New
Socialist	Shanker Rao Eknath Rao	539	3.21%	New
Margin of victory		779	4.65%	
Turnout		16,767	28.32%	
Total valid votes		16,767		
Registered electors		59,200		
INC win (new seat)				
