= Tukaram Renge Patil =

Indian politician

Tukaram Ganpatrao Renge Patil

Member of Parliament, Lok Sabha
- In office (2004 - 2009)
- Preceded by: Suresh Jadhav (Shiv Sena)
- Succeeded by: Ganeshrao Nagorao Dudhgaonkar (Shiv Sena)
- Constituency: Parbhani

Member of Maharashtra Legislative Assembly
- In office (1995-1999), (1999-2004)
- Preceded by: Hanumantrao Bobde (Shiv Sena)
- Succeeded by: Sanjay Haribhau Jadhav (Shiv Sena)
- Constituency: Parbhani

Personal details
- Born: 21 February 1958 (age 68) Parbhani, Maharashtra
- Party: Indian National Congress, before 2008 Shiv Sena
- Spouse: Laxmi
- Children: 3 sons
- As of 16 September, 2006

Tukaram Ganpatrao Renge Patil (born 21 February 1958) is an Indian National Congress politician from Parbhani, Maharashtra. He was a member of the 14th Lok Sabha of India. He represented the Parbhani constituency of Maharashtra. He was also a member of the Maharashtra Legislative Assembly for two terms from 1995 to 2004.

On Thursday 24 July 2008, the Shiv Sena expelled him from the party for defying its whip and abstaining from voting in the confidence motion for the UPA government.
