= Mira Renge =

Indian politician

- मीरा रेंगे

Member of Maharashtra Legislative Assembly
- In office 2009–2014
- Preceded by: Babajani Durrani
- Succeeded by: Mohan Fad
- Constituency: Pathri

Personal details
- Party: Shiv Sena
- Occupation: Politician

Mira Kalyanrao Renge (Marathi: मीरा कल्याणराव रेंगे) is Shiv Sena politician from Parbhani district, Marathwada. She was a member of the 12th Maharashtra Legislative Assembly representing the Pathri Assembly Constituency.

== Positions held ==
- 2009: Elected to the Maharashtra Legislative Assembly
