= Mulshi Assembly constituency =

Former constituency of the Maharashtra legislative assembly in India

Mulshi
- Former constituency No. 244 for the Maharashtra Legislative Assembly

Constituency details
- Country: India
- Region: Western India
- State: Maharashtra
- District: Pune
- Established: 1967
- Abolished: 2008

Mulshi Vidhan Sabha seat was one of the constituencies of Maharashtra Vidhan Sabha, in India. Mulshi seat existed until the 2004 elections after which it was abolished in 2008.

== Members of Vidhan Sabha ==
Year	Member	Party
1967	Namdevrao Mohol	Indian National Congress
1972	Namdev Ramkrishanrao Mate	Indian National Congress
1978	Namdev Ramkrishanrao Mate	Indian National Congress
1980	Vidura Nawale	Indian National Congress (U)
1985	Ashok Mohol	Indian National Congress
1990	Ashok Mohol	Indian National Congress
1995	Ashok Mohol	Indian National Congress
1999	Vitthal Alias Kumar Bajirao Gosavi	Nationalist Congress Party
2004	Sharad Dhamale	Shiv Sena
2008 onwards: Constituency defunct

== Election results ==
=== Assembly Election 2004 ===
2004 Maharashtra Legislative Assembly election : Mulshi
Party	Candidate	Votes	%	±%
SS	Dhamale Sharad Bajirao	78,701	38.33%	▲8.96
NCP	Rajendra Tukaram Hagawane	61,594	30.00%	▼17.80
Independent	Kumar Alias Vitthal Bajirao Gosavi	56,159	27.35%	New
BSP	Vinayak Dagadu Kamble	4,782	2.33%	New
Independent	Bhorkade Prabhakar Siddhu	2,892	1.41%	New
Margin of victory		17,107	8.33%	▼10.10
Turnout		2,05,366	49.00%	▼3.16
Total valid votes		2,05,324		
Registered electors		4,19,117		▲65.80
SS gain from NCP		Swing	▼9.47	

=== Assembly Election 1999 ===
1999 Maharashtra Legislative Assembly election : Mulshi
Party	Candidate	Votes	%	±%
NCP	Vithal Alias Kumar Bajirao Gosavi	60,360	47.80%	New
SS	Raikar Rajabhau Damodar	37,081	29.37%	▼6.46
INC	Shrirang Eknath Chavan	27,968	22.15%	▼42.15
Margin of victory		23,279	18.44%	▼10.04
Turnout		1,31,849	52.16%	▲21.26
Total valid votes		1,26,268		
Registered electors		2,52,786		▲1.35
NCP gain from INC		Swing	▼16.50	

=== Assembly By-election 1998 ===
1998 Maharashtra Legislative Assembly by-election : Mulshi
Party	Candidate	Votes	%	±%
INC	Vithal Alias Kumar Bajirao Gosavi	49,562	64.30%	▲18.19
SS	Rameshchandra alias Abasaheb Dhamale	27,615	35.83%	▼4.05
Margin of victory		21,947	28.47%	▲22.25
Turnout		78,106	31.32%	▼34.89
Total valid votes		77,077		
Registered electors		2,49,414		▲2.86
INC hold		Swing	▲18.19	

=== Assembly Election 1995 ===
1995 Maharashtra Legislative Assembly election : Mulshi
Party	Candidate	Votes	%	±%
INC	Ashok Namdeorao Mohol	73,559	46.11%	▼20.89
SS	Nana Balkawade	63,625	39.88%	▲16.92
BSP	Pandurang Maruti Raut	6,595	4.13%	New
JD	Balasaheb Arjun Hagawane	5,879	3.69%	▼4.54
Independent	Dilip Sudamrao Kolekar	4,161	2.61%	New
Independent	Vasant Genu Chaure	2,238	1.40%	New
Independent	Ashok Mahadeo Khandave	1,059	0.66%	New
Margin of victory		9,934	6.23%	▼37.81
Turnout		1,64,472	67.83%	▲11.45
Total valid votes		1,59,535		
Registered electors		2,42,470		▲21.21
INC hold		Swing	▼20.89	

=== Assembly Election 1990 ===
1990 Maharashtra Legislative Assembly election : Mulshi
Party	Candidate	Votes	%	±%
INC	Ashok Namdeorao Mohol	72,834	67.00%	▲10.21
SS	Nandu alias Bhausaheb Ghate	24,965	22.96%	New
JD	Beldare Ekanath Maliba	8,944	8.23%	New
Independent	Nanaware Anand Laxman	858	0.79%	New
Margin of victory		47,869	44.03%	▲30.05
Turnout		1,11,059	55.52%	▼5.29
Total valid votes		1,08,709		
Registered electors		2,00,044		▲50.01
INC hold		Swing	▲10.21	

=== Assembly Election 1985 ===
1985 Maharashtra Legislative Assembly election : Mulshi
Party	Candidate	Votes	%	±%
INC	Ashok Namdeorao Mohol	45,160	56.79%	New
IC(S)	Konde Shivajirao Narayan	34,043	42.81%	New
Margin of victory		11,117	13.98%	▼18.42
Turnout		81,324	60.98%	▲8.50
Total valid votes		79,523		
Registered electors		1,33,354		▲15.14
INC gain from INC(U)		Swing	▼7.65	

=== Assembly Election 1980 ===
1980 Maharashtra Legislative Assembly election : Mulshi
Party	Candidate	Votes	%	±%
INC(U)	Navale Vidura Vithoba	38,158	64.44%	New
INC(I)	Ashok Namdeorao Mohol	18,974	32.04%	New
PWPI	Pasalkar Ramchandra Baburao	1,399	2.36%	New
Independent	Gandhi Champalal Chhogalal	687	1.16%	New
Margin of victory		19,184	32.40%	▲22.37
Turnout		60,807	52.50%	▼10.67
Total valid votes		59,218		
Registered electors		1,15,816		▲13.74
INC(U) gain from INC		Swing	▲11.15	

=== Assembly Election 1978 ===
1978 Maharashtra Legislative Assembly election : Mulshi
Party	Candidate	Votes	%	±%
INC	Mate Namdev Ramkrishanrao	33,530	53.28%	▼25.91
JP	Khilare Diwakar Jaisingrao	27,222	43.26%	New
Independent	Gujar Nivrutti Namdev	2,177	3.46%	New
Margin of victory		6,308	10.02%	▼58.39
Turnout		65,174	64.01%	▲10.23
Total valid votes		62,929		
Registered electors		1,01,823		▲8.77
INC hold		Swing	▼25.91	

=== Assembly Election 1972 ===
1972 Maharashtra Legislative Assembly election : Mulshi
Party	Candidate	Votes	%	±%
INC	Mate Namdev Ramkrishanrao	38,234	79.19%	▲6.55
Independent	Ghule Bajirao Laxman	5,204	10.78%	New
SSP	Krishnarao G. Marne	4,842	10.03%	New
Margin of victory		33,030	68.41%	▲16.43
Turnout		49,902	53.31%	▼11.45
Total valid votes		48,280		
Registered electors		93,611		▲20.68
INC hold		Swing	▲6.55	

=== Assembly Election 1967 ===
1967 Maharashtra Legislative Assembly election : Mulshi
Party	Candidate	Votes	%	±%
INC	N. S. Mohol	35,513	72.64%	New
SSP	S. S. Konde	10,099	20.66%	New
ABJS	M. R. Walekar	3,276	6.70%	New
Margin of victory		25,414	51.98%	
Turnout		52,505	67.69%	
Total valid votes		48,888		
Registered electors		77,571		
INC win (new seat)				

== See also ==
- List of constituencies of Maharashtra Legislative Assembly
