= Mangaon Assembly constituency =

Constituency of the Maharashtra legislative assembly in India

Mangaon
- Former constituency for the Maharashtra Legislative Assembly

Constituency details
- Country: India
- Region: Western India
- State: Maharashtra
- Established: 1957
- Abolished: 2008
- Total electors: 180,495

Mangaon Assembly constituency was an assembly constituency in the India state of Maharashtra.

== Members of the Legislative Assembly ==
Election	Member	Party
From 1952 - 1957 see: Mangaon Mhasla Mahad
1952	Dattatraya Malogi Talegaonkar	Indian National Congress
1957	Gaikwad Tanhaji Ganpat (Sc)	Independent politician
1957	Tipnis Surendranath Govind	Praja Socialist Party
1962	Dattatraya Malogi Talegaonkar	Indian National Congress
1967	Pandurang Ramaji Sanap	Peasants and Workers Party of India
1972	Ram Vithhal Mahalunge	Indian National Congress
1978	Ram Vithhal Mahalunge	Indian National Congress
1980	Ashok Sabale	Janata Party
1985	Nilkanth Janardhan Sawant	Peasants and Workers Party of India
1990	Ashok Sabale	Indian National Congress
1995	Sunil Tatkare	Indian National Congress
1999	Sunil Tatkare	Nationalist Congress Party
2004	Sunil Tatkare	Nationalist Congress Party

== Election results ==
=== Assembly Election 2004 ===
2004 Maharashtra Legislative Assembly election : Mangaon
Party	Candidate	Votes	%	±%
NCP	Sunil Tatkare	69,865	55.80%	▲7.94
SS	Anant Vasant Alias Bal Lokhande	37,591	30.02%	▼9.25
PWPI	Aslam Ibrahim Raut	10,131	8.09%	New
Independent	Ashok Tanaji Gaikwad	3,225	2.58%	New
Independent	Pankaj Ravindra Tambe	2,587	2.07%	New
BSP	Thore Kundlik Namdeo	1,812	1.45%	New
Margin of victory		32,274	25.78%	▲17.20
Turnout		1,25,215	69.37%	▲5.34
Total valid votes		1,25,211		
Registered electors		1,80,495		▲15.03
NCP hold		Swing	▲7.94	

=== Assembly Election 1999 ===
1999 Maharashtra Legislative Assembly election : Mangaon
Party	Candidate	Votes	%	±%
NCP	Sunil Tatkare	41,573	47.85%	New
SS	Ghosalkar Vinod Ramchandra	34,120	39.27%	▲9.82
INC	More Ashokrao Ganpatrao	5,472	6.30%	▼35.81
Independent	Ganesh Balu Shirke	3,813	4.39%	New
Independent	Pravin Keshav Pisat	1,108	1.28%	New
Independent	Tatkare Shantram Balaram	570	0.66%	New
Margin of victory		7,453	8.58%	▼4.08
Turnout		1,00,479	64.03%	▼11.77
Total valid votes		86,876		
Registered electors		1,56,917		▲12.38
NCP gain from INC		Swing	▲5.75	

=== Assembly Election 1995 ===
1995 Maharashtra Legislative Assembly election : Mangaon
Party	Candidate	Votes	%	±%
INC	Sunil Tatkare	44,569	42.11%	▼0.81
SS	Ghosalkar Vinod Ramchandra	31,175	29.45%	▲4.95
PWPI	Nana Sawant	28,034	26.49%	▼3.97
BBM	Jagtap Janu Hiru	2,068	1.95%	New
Margin of victory		13,394	12.65%	▲0.19
Turnout		1,09,600	78.49%	▲14.02
Total valid votes		1,05,846		
Registered electors		1,39,635		▼4.66
INC hold		Swing	▼0.81	

=== Assembly Election 1990 ===
1990 Maharashtra Legislative Assembly election : Mangaon
Party	Candidate	Votes	%	±%
INC	Ashok Sabale	38,834	42.92%	▲1.66
PWPI	Bhai Sawant	27,557	30.46%	▼18.81
SS	Padwal Harischandra Pandurang	22,171	24.50%	New
Independent	V. K. Jadhav	1,771	1.96%	New
Margin of victory		11,277	12.46%	▲4.46
Turnout		92,831	63.39%	▲3.59
Total valid votes		90,480		
Registered electors		1,46,455		▲25.52
INC gain from PWPI		Swing	▼6.34	

=== Assembly Election 1985 ===
1985 Maharashtra Legislative Assembly election : Mangaon
Party	Candidate	Votes	%	±%
PWPI	Nilkanth Janardhan Sawant	33,445	49.26%	New
INC	Sunil Dattatray Tatkare	28,013	41.26%	New
Independent	Andhere Bal Mahadev	3,711	5.47%	New
Independent	B. B. More	1,647	2.43%	New
Independent	Krishna Kalu Gaikwad	1,074	1.58%	New
Margin of victory		5,432	8.00%	▲5.49
Turnout		70,381	60.32%	▲5.28
Total valid votes		67,890		
Registered electors		1,16,674		▲13.42
PWPI gain from JP		Swing	▲0.28	

=== Assembly Election 1980 ===
1980 Maharashtra Legislative Assembly election : Mangaon
Party	Candidate	Votes	%	±%
JP	Ashok Sabale	26,662	48.98%	New
INC(I)	Ashok Laxman Lokhande	25,293	46.47%	New
Independent	H. P. Padwal	1,313	2.41%	New
Independent	Krishna Kalu Gaikwad	611	1.12%	New
Independent	Vijay Sawant	550	1.01%	New
Margin of victory		1,369	2.52%	▼6.88
Turnout		56,766	55.18%	▼4.41
Total valid votes		54,429		
Registered electors		1,02,873		▲8.06
JP gain from INC		Swing	▲15.42	

=== Assembly Election 1978 ===
1978 Maharashtra Legislative Assembly election : Mangaon
Party	Candidate	Votes	%	±%
INC	Ram Vithhal Mahalunge	18,313	33.56%	New
Independent	Gaikwad Krishna Kalu	13,185	24.16%	New
Independent	Sanap Padurang Ramji	11,952	21.90%	New
Independent	Pawar Ramchandra Sahadeo	8,060	14.77%	New
Independent	More Balu Bhamboo	2,383	4.37%	New
Independent	Balarm Vithal Ghadge	673	1.23%	New
Margin of victory		5,128	9.40%	
Turnout		56,963	59.83%	
Total valid votes		54,566		
Registered electors		95,204		▲1.10
INC hold		Swing		

=== Assembly Election 1972 ===
1972 Maharashtra Legislative Assembly election : Mangaon
Party	Candidate	Votes	%	±%
INC	Mahalunge Ram Vithal	Unopposed		
Registered electors		94,172		
INC gain from PWPI		Swing		

=== Assembly Election 1967 ===
1967 Maharashtra Legislative Assembly election : Mangaon
Party	Candidate	Votes	%	±%
PWPI	P. R. Sanap	28,909	57.79%	New
INC	B. S. Sule	16,715	33.41%	▼19.92
Independent	L. K. Lokhande	2,417	4.83%	New
ABJS	L. B. Bhrpe	1,982	3.96%	▼6.99
Margin of victory		12,194	24.38%	▼7.98
Turnout		53,791	63.28%	▲18.99
Total valid votes		50,023		
Registered electors		85,005		▲38.49
PWPI gain from INC		Swing	▲4.46	

=== Assembly Election 1962 ===
1962 Maharashtra Legislative Assembly election : Mangaon
Party	Candidate	Votes	%	±%
INC	Dattatraya Malogi Talegaonkar	13,047	53.33%	▲34.81
Independent	Tanaji Ganpat Gaikwa	5,132	20.98%	New
RPI	Shantaram Changdeo Bhandarkar	3,605	14.74%	New
ABJS	Changdeo Bhavanrao Khairmode	2,679	10.95%	New
Margin of victory		7,915	32.35%	▲32.33
Turnout		27,173	44.27%	▼57.33
Total valid votes		24,463		
Registered electors		61,380		▼43.38
INC gain from Independent		Swing	▲21.28	

=== Assembly Election 1957 ===
1957 Bombay State Legislative Assembly election : Mangaon
Party	Candidate	Votes	%	±%
Independent	Gaikwad Tanhaji Ganpat (Sc)	33,772	32.05%	New
PSP	Tipnis Surendranath Govind	33,741	32.02%	New
INC	Kajrolkar Ramchandra Sadoba (Sc)	19,514	18.52%	New
INC	Antule Abdui Rahiman Abdul Gafoor	15,083	14.32%	New
Independent	Talegaonkar Dattatraya Malojirao (Sc)	3,249	3.08%	New
Margin of victory		31	0.03%	
Turnout		1,05,359	97.18%	
Total valid votes		1,05,359		
Registered electors		1,08,416		
Independent win (new seat)				
