= Suresh Warpudkar =

Indian politician

Minister of State Government of Maharashtra
- In office 8 December 2008 – 15 October 2009
- Minister: Agriculture

Member of Maharashtra Legislative Assembly
- In office (2019–2024)
- Preceded by: Mohan Fad
- Succeeded by: Rajesh Vitekar
- Constituency: Pathri (Vidhan Sabha constituency)

Member of Maharashtra Legislative Assembly
- In office (1986–1990),(1990–1995),(1995–1999), (2004-2009)
- Preceded by: Balasaheb Rajaramji Game
- Succeeded by: Manikrao Jadhav
- Constituency: Singnapur

Member of Parliament, Lok Sabha
- In office (1998–1999)
- Preceded by: Suresh Jadhav
- Succeeded by: Suresh Jadhav
- Constituency: Parbhani

Personal details
- Born: Suresh Ambadasrao Warpudkar; 15 July 1951 (age 75) Varpud, Parbhani, Hyderabad State, (present-day Maharashtra, India)
- Party: Bharatiya Janata Party (2025-Present)
- Other political affiliations: Indian National Congress (Before 1999), (2014-2025); Nationalist Congress Party (1999-2014)
- Spouse: Meena Warpudkar (m. 1974)
- Education: BSc Agriculture
- Alma mater: Marathwada Krishi Vidyapeeth, Parbhani
- Occupation: Farmer, politician, and social worker

Suresh Ambadasrao Warpudkar (born 15 July 1951) is an Indian politician who was the member of Maharashtra Legislative Assembly for five term from Pathri and Singnapur vidhan sabha as an Indian National Congress candidate. He was also a minister of state in Government of Maharashtra and Member of Parliament in 1998 from Parbhani.

Suresh Warpudkar is a senior most Congress leader from Parbhani district and had join BJP in July 2025 ahead of the civic body and Zilla Parishad elections in the state.

== Early life and education ==
Warpudkar was born on 15 July 1951 in Warpud village of Parbhani District. His father, Ambadasrao Warpudkar was a farmer.

Warpudkar received his initial schooling from Warpud, He then transferred to Parbhani town, where he received most of his schooling and completed BSc in Agriculture from Marathwada Krishi Vidyapeeth in 1972.

== Personal life ==
Warpudkar married Meena Warpudkar on 29 June 1974, with whom he has a son and two daughters. His wife was mayor of Parbhani Municipal Corporation.

== Positions held ==
MLA- 5 times

- Member of Maharashtra Legislative Assembly (MLA) for Singnapur Assembly constituency 1986–1999 (3 terms)
- Member of Maharashtra Legislative Assembly (MLA) for Singnapur Assembly constituency 2004–2009
- Member of Indian Parliament for Parbhani (Lok Sabha constituency) 1998–1999.
- Member, Committee on Science and Technology 1998–1999
- Environment and Forests; and its Sub-Committee on Ganga Action Plan 1998–1999
- Member, Consultative Committee, Ministry of Labour 1998–1999
- Special Invitee, Consultative Committee, Ministry of Agriculture 1998–1999
- Minister of state in Government of Maharashtra for agriculture 2008–2009
- Chairman, Parbhani Distt. Central Co-operative Bank Ltd., Parbhani
- Narshinha Sosuk Ltd. Luhgoan, Parbhani District
- Director, Maharashtra State Co-operative Bank, Mumbai
- Currently District President Nationalist Congress Party, Parbhani
