= Mohan Fad =

Indian politician

Mohan Phad

Member of Maharashtra Legislative Assembly
- In office 2014–2019
- Preceded by: Mira Renge (Shiv Sena)
- Succeeded by: Suresh Warpudkar (INC )
- Constituency: Pathri

Personal details
- Party: Bharatiya Janata Party
- Occupation: Politician, businessman and social worker

Mohan Madhavrao Phad alias Mohan Phad is a BJP politician from Parbhani District, Maharashtra. He was a member of the 13th Maharashtra Legislative Assembly representing the Pathri Assembly Constituency.

== Political career ==
Phad has been elected in Maharashtra Legislative Assembly election in 2014 from Pathri constituency as Independent candidate and later joined BJP. In Maharashtra assembly election 2019, he contested as a Bharatiya Janata Party candidate and lost to the INC candidate from Pathri (Vidhan Sabha constituency). He is working for near about 50 thousand patients of Pathri constituency and these peoples were to get government health services at Mumbai and new Mumbai, Pune with the help of Mr Mohan Phad. He is very prominent leader and works for peoples of Parbhani because he is known as Arogyasevak. Other work done by him are roads of Pathri constituency as well in his era and some roads done by his personal money in Pathri constituency.
