= Mangaon Mhasla Mahad Assembly constituency =

Constituency of the Maharashtra legislative assembly in India

Mangaon Mhasla Mahad
- Former constituency for the Maharashtra Legislative Assembly

Constituency details
- Country: India
- Region: Western India
- State: Maharashtra
- Established: 1951
- Abolished: 1955
- Total electors: 94,678
- Reservation: ST

Mangaon Mhasla Mahad Assembly constituency was an assembly constituency in the India state of Maharashtra. After the 1955 Delimitation act, it was merged into Mangaon and Mahad constituencies.

== Members of the Legislative Assembly ==
Election	Member	Party
1952	Deshmukh Prabhakar Ramkrishna	Indian National Congress
1952	Talegaonkar Dattatray Maloji	Indian National Congress

== Election results ==
=== Assembly Election 1952 ===
1952 Bombay State Legislative Assembly election : Mangaon Mhasla Mahad
Party	Candidate	Votes	%	±%
INC	Deshmukh Prabhakar Ramkrishna	23,980	26.87%	New
INC	Talegaonkar Dattatray Maloji	22,811	25.56%	New
SCF	Ambedkar Yeshwant Bhimrao	16,568	18.56%	New
Socialist	Tipnis Surendranath Govind	16,410	18.38%	New
PWPI	Jadhav Dattatray Balkrishna	9,489	10.63%	New
Margin of victory		7,412	8.30%	
Turnout		89,258	47.14%	
Total valid votes		89,258		
Registered electors		94,678		
INC win (new seat)				
