= Singnapur Assembly constituency =

Constituency of the Maharashtra legislative assembly in India

Singnapur
- Former constituency for the Maharashtra Legislative Assembly

Constituency details
- Country: India
- Region: Western India
- State: Maharashtra
- Established: 1978
- Abolished: 2008
- Total electors: 176,125

Kalmeshwar Assembly constituency Singnapur Assembly constituency

Singnapur Assembly constituency was an assembly constituency in the India state of Maharashtra.

== Members of the Legislative Assembly ==
| Election | Member | Party |
|---|---|---|
| 1978 | Uttamrao Abaji Gawali | Indian National Congress |
| 1980 | Raosaheb Bapusaheb Jamkar | Indian National Congress |
| 1985 | Balasaheb Rajaramji Game | Indian National Congress |
| 1985 By-election | Warpudkar Suresh Ambadasrao | Independent politician |
| 1990 | Suresh Warpudkar | Indian National Congress |
| 1995 | Suresh Warpudkar | Indian National Congress |
| 1999 | Manikrao Sopanrao Jadhav | Shiv Sena |
| 2004 | Suresh Warpudkar | Independent politician |

== Election results ==
=== Assembly Election 2004 ===
2004 Maharashtra Legislative Assembly election : Singnapur
| Party | Candidate | Votes | % | ±% |
|---|---|---|---|---|
| Independent | Suresh Ambadasrao Warpudkar | 45,561 | 35.75% | New |
| SS | Ambegaonkar Manikrao Sopanrao (Jadhav) | 26,158 | 20.52% | ▼18.70 |
| INC | Jamkar Raosaheb Bapusaheb | 25,488 | 20.00% | ▼9.28 |
| Independent | Phale Babasaheb Sheshrao | 17,848 | 14.00% | New |
| RSPS | Rabadade Vitthal Jivanaji | 4,540 | 3.56% | New |
| Independent | Abdagire Aashroba Baburao | 3,343 | 2.62% | New |
| Independent | Salve Sudhakar Umaji | 1,663 | 1.30% | New |
| Margin of victory | | 19,403 | 15.22% | ▲5.29 |
| Turnout | | 127,448 | 72.36% | ▲3.20 |
| Registered electors | | 176,125 | | ▲14.70 |
| Independent gain from SS | | Swing | ▼3.47 | |

=== Assembly Election 1999 ===
1999 Maharashtra Legislative Assembly election : Singnapur
| Party | Candidate | Votes | % | ±% |
|---|---|---|---|---|
| SS | Jadhav Manikrao Sopanrao | 41,656 | 39.22% | ▲17.02 |
| INC | Phale Babasaheb Sheshrao | 31,101 | 29.28% | ▼13.14 |
| NCP | Ghatge Rambhau Nanasaheb | 21,386 | 20.14% | New |
| Independent | Hake Suryakant Mukund | 3,008 | 2.83% | New |
| Independent | Zafar Ahmedkhan Mahboobkhan | 805 | 0.76% | New |
| Margin of victory | | 10,555 | 9.94% | ▼9.86 |
| Turnout | | 106,209 | 64.46% | ▼9.73 |
| Registered electors | | 153,556 | | ▲3.74 |
| SS gain from INC | | Swing | ▼3.20 | |

=== Assembly Election 1995 ===
1995 Maharashtra Legislative Assembly election : Singnapur
| Party | Candidate | Votes | % | ±% |
|---|---|---|---|---|
| INC | Suresh Ambadasrao Warpudkar | 49,540 | 42.42% | ▼16.13 |
| Independent | Gawali Uttamrao Abaji | 26,415 | 22.62% | New |
| SS | More Mangala Haribhau | 25,929 | 22.20% | ▼15.85 |
| BBM | Shisodia Sushil Keshavrao | 5,170 | 4.43% | New |
| Independent | Pawar Manikrao Rashoji | 3,597 | 3.08% | New |
| Independent | M. Gaus M. Yashin | 1,374 | 1.18% | New |
| Independent | More Wamanrao Ranganath | 883 | 0.76% | New |
| Margin of victory | | 23,125 | 19.80% | ▼0.70 |
| Turnout | | 116,776 | 76.66% | ▲10.03 |
| Registered electors | | 148,016 | | ▲2.38 |
| INC hold | | Swing | ▼16.13 | |

=== Assembly Election 1990 ===
1990 Maharashtra Legislative Assembly election : Singnapur
| Party | Candidate | Votes | % | ±% |
|---|---|---|---|---|
| INC | Suresh Ambadasrao Warpudkar | 58,295 | 58.56% | New |
| SS | Renge Tukaram Ganpatrao | 37,882 | 38.05% | New |
| JD | Laxmanrao Tatyarao | 1,246 | 1.25% | New |
| Margin of victory | | 20,413 | 20.51% | |
| Turnout | | 99,551 | 67.74% | |
| Registered electors | | 144,570 | | |
| INC gain from Independent | | Swing | | |

=== Assembly By-election 1985 ===
1985 Maharashtra Legislative Assembly by-election : Singnapur
| Party | Candidate | Votes | % | ±% |
|---|---|---|---|---|
| Independent | Warpudkar Suresh Ambadasrao | 24,331 | | New |
| IC(S) | Gawali Uttamrao Abaji | 24,019 | | |
| Margin of victory | | 312 | | |
| Independent gain from INC | | Swing | | |

=== Assembly Election 1985 ===
1985 Maharashtra Legislative Assembly election : Singnapur
| Party | Candidate | Votes | % | ±% |
|---|---|---|---|---|
| INC | Game Balasaheb Rajaramji | 37,562 | 53.42% | New |
| IC(S) | Gawali Uttamrao Abaji | 30,955 | 44.03% | New |
| Margin of victory | | 6,607 | 9.40% | ▼32.87 |
| Turnout | | 70,309 | 59.78% | ▲10.15 |
| Registered electors | | 114,615 | | ▲8.39 |
| INC gain from INC(I) | | Swing | | |

=== Assembly Election 1980 ===
1980 Maharashtra Legislative Assembly election : Singnapur
| Party | Candidate | Votes | % | ±% |
|---|---|---|---|---|
| INC(I) | Jamkar Raosaheb Bapusaheb | 32,184 | 59.45% | ▲39.79 |
| PWPI | Naik Babarao Sapanrao | 9,306 | 17.19% | ▼4.99 |
| INC(U) | Rasad Devidasrao Bajirao | 8,274 | 15.28% | New |
| Independent | Thenge Kishanrao Ramchandra | 1,454 | 2.69% | New |
| BJP | Kachawe Balasaheb Tulsiram | 1,199 | 2.21% | New |
| Margin of victory | | 22,878 | 42.26% | ▲31.97 |
| Turnout | | 54,132 | 49.70% | ▼8.57 |
| Registered electors | | 105,745 | | ▲8.84 |
| INC(I) gain from INC | | Swing | ▲26.97 | |

=== Assembly Election 1978 ===
1978 Maharashtra Legislative Assembly election : Singnapur
| Party | Candidate | Votes | % | ±% |
|---|---|---|---|---|
| INC | Gawali Uttamrao Abaji | 18,860 | 32.48% | New |
| PWPI | Jadhav Manikrao Kishanrao | 12,881 | 22.18% | New |
| INC(I) | Choudhari Narayanrao Trimbakrao | 11,419 | 19.67% | New |
| JP | Gavane Ganpatrao Shankerrao | 8,448 | 14.55% | New |
| Independent | Mokashe Kalyanrao Rajeshwarrao | 2,673 | 4.60% | New |
| Independent | Kachve Mohanrao Tulsiram | 944 | 1.63% | New |
| Independent | Kale Piraji Govindrao | 567 | 0.98% | New |
| Margin of victory | | 5,979 | 10.30% | |
| Turnout | | 58,062 | 57.75% | |
| Registered electors | | 97,160 | | |
| INC win (new seat) | | | | |
