= Shivajirao Shankarrao Deshmukh =

Indian politician (1931–1977)

Member of Parliament
- In office 1962-1977
- Preceded by: Ramrao Yadav
- Succeeded by: Sheshrao Deshmukh
- Constituency: Parbhani

Personal details
- Born: 30 July 1931 Kupta Tal-Manora Dist-Washim
- Died: 2 July 1978 (aged 46)
- Party: Indian National Congress
- Spouse: Shalinitai Deshmukh
- Children: 1 son, 2 daughters
- Profession: Advocate, farmer, politician
- As of 22 February, 2012

Shivajirao Shankarao Deshmukh (30 July 1931 – 2 July 1978) was an Indian politician who was a Member of Parliament from Parbhani in Maharashtra. He served during the 3rd, 4th and 5th Lok Sabha and was elected as an Indian National Congress candidate.

Shivajirao Deshmukh served as an elected Secretary of Congress Parliamentary Committee for two terms, 1968–69 and 1969–70 and was Member of Executive Committee, Congress Parliamentary Committee, 1967—70 and also Founder President of Marathwada Sahakari Sakhar karkhana at Dongarkada village in Kalamnuri taluka Dist. Hingoli. He was married to Shrimati Shalini, and had a son, Sambhajirao Shivajirao Deshmukh, and two daughters, Sushma and Sujata. He studied law in Hyderabad. Shivajirao Deshmukh died on 2 July 1978, at the age of 46.
