= Ganeshrao Dudhgaonkar =

Indian politician

Member of Parliament, Lok Sabha
- In office 2009-2014
- Preceded by: Tukaram Renge Patil
- Succeeded by: Sanjay Haribhau Jadhav
- Constituency: Parbhani

Minister of State in Government of Maharashtra for Technical Education, EGS and Employment
- In office 1983

Member of Maharashtra Legislative Assembly
- In office 1980-1985
- Succeeded by: Jadhav Munjaji Narayanrao (INC)
- Constituency: Basmath

Member of Maharashtra Legislative Assembly
- In office 1985-1990
- Preceded by: Bhamble Manikrao Keshavrao (Indian National Congress (I))
- Succeeded by: Ramprasad Wamanrao Bordikar (INC)
- Constituency: Jintur

Personal details
- Born: Ganeshrao Nagorao Raut Dudhgaonkar; 9 September 1945 (age 80) Dudhgaon, Jintur, Parbhani District, Hyderabad State, (present-day Maharashtra, India)
- Citizenship: Indian
- Party: Shiv Sena, Indian National Congress (I), INC, NCP
- Spouse: Sandhya Shridharrao Kadam (m. 1970)
- Children: 2
- Parent: Nagorao Raut Dudhgaonkar
- Education: BA, LLB (1975)
- Profession: Advocate, educationist

Ganeshrao Nagorao Raut-Dudhgaonkar (born 9 September 1945) is an Indian politician from Parbhani, Maharashtra. He was a member of the 15th Lok Sabha of India representing Parbhani constituency. He was a member of Maharashtra Legislative Assembly in 1980 and 1985, representing Basmath and Jintur, respectively. He was a member of the Indian National Congress, Shiv Sena, and Nationalist Congress Party. Ahead of the 2019 Maharashtra Legislative Assembly election he joined Vanchit Bahujan Aghadi. He defeated Suresh Warpudkar, a Congress candidate in 2009.

== Personal life ==
Dudhgaonkar married Sandhya Shridharrao Kadam on 2 June 1970. The couple has one son and one daughter. His son Sameer joined BJP in 2018. He completed his BA and LLB degrees. His wife, Sandhya, completed her education in Msc and Phd and is an associate professor.

== Career ==
Dudhgaonkar played an active role in the development of Marathwada. He advocated for the construction of a canal for Jayakwadi which was stalled for 16 years. As a result, about 20 thousand hectares of land in Gangakhed, Palam and Loha talukas were deprived of irrigation. Due to the accumulation of silt in the dams in Marathwada, it was necessary to increase the height of the dams. He suggested that setting a deadline would speed the progress and launch a green revolution in Osmanabad, Beed and Latur districts.

Recognizing the need for industrialization, Dudhgaonkar emphasized railway development. He suggested that development would be boosted if the Parli-Beed-Nagar route was expanded by doubling the railway tracks. He insisted that the curriculum of secondary-primary education should be on CBSE lines. He proposed the Build-Operate-Transfer (BOT) concept for creating the Akola-Nanded and Nagar-Beed-Nanded national roads. He campaigned for the development of AIIMS specialty hospitals in the Marathwada area, highlighting the importance of locating in Parbhani, which he considered to be the state's epicenter. He advised the committee to make efforts for the Hajira to Nanded Gas Pipeline which benefits the Marathwada region.
