= Chandrashekhar Prabhu =

Indian politician, architect, professor, and urban planner

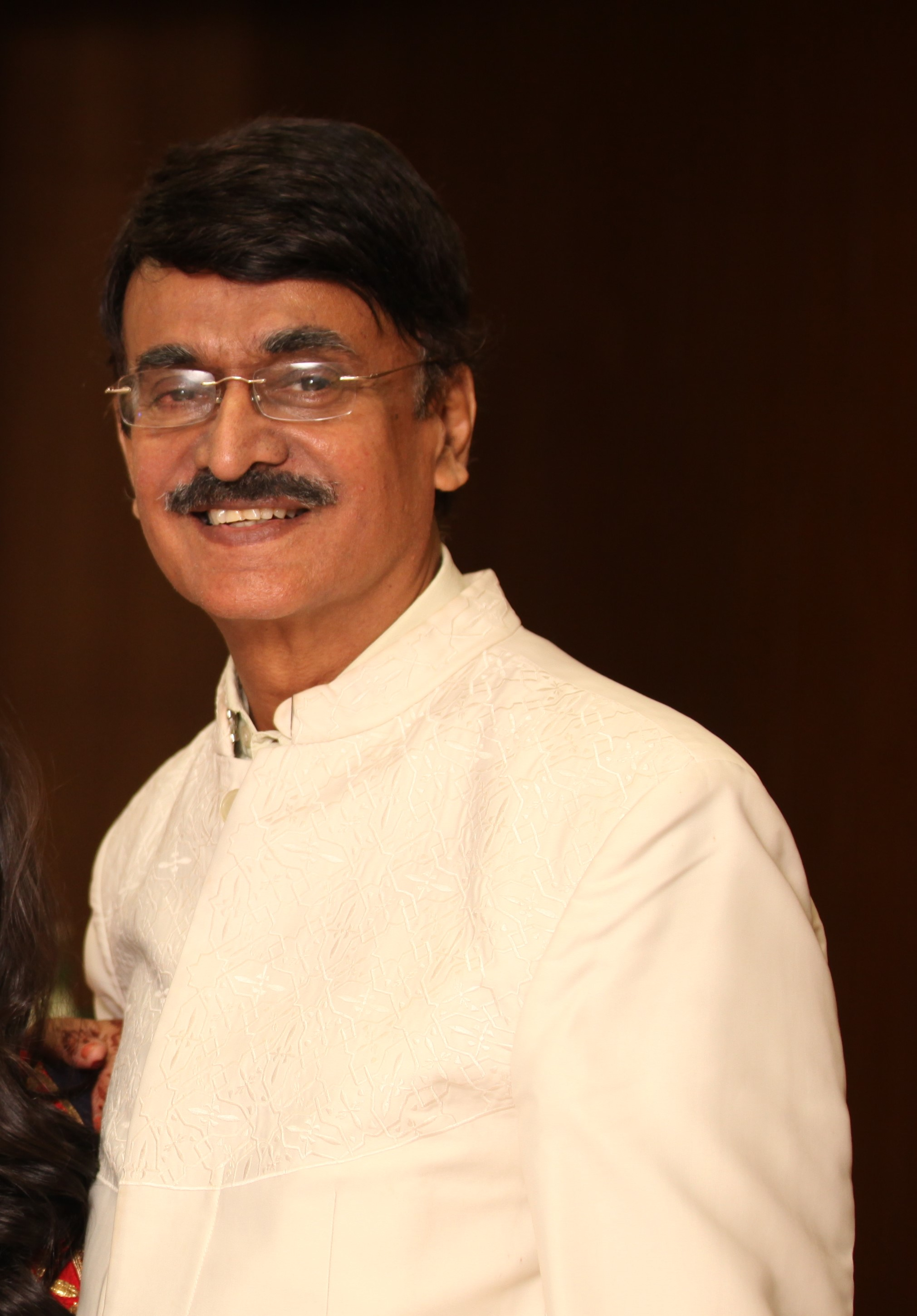

Member of Maharashtra Legislative Assembly
- In office 1985–1990
- Preceded by: Jayawantiben Mehta
- Succeeded by: Chandrakant Padwal
- Constituency: Opera House

Personal details
- Born: 13 July 1956 (age 69) Mumbai
- Spouse: Naina Prabhu
- Children: Sneha Prabhu, Chaitanya Prabhu
- Education: BArch (Hons) FIIA, FIIID
- Alma mater: Sir J. J. College of Architecture
- Occupation: Architect
- Awards: Sir J J Architecture Award

Chandrashekhar Prabhu is an Indian politician, architect, professor, and urban planner and management expert, having held public and corporate positions.

== Education ==
Prabhu graduated from Sir J. J. College of Architecture, Bombay University.

== Career ==
Prabhu was the youngest member elected to the State Legislative Assembly. He was elevated to the post of the President of the Maharashtra Housing and Area Development Authority, a cabinet rank position. He has also served as the Chairman of Santacruz Electronic Export Processing Zone, Mumbai (1982–93), Chairman of the Drugs and Pharmaceutical Committee of the Government of Maharashtra. He was on the board of the Bombay Metropolitan Region Development Authority, now the Mumbai Metropolitan Region Development Authority from 1985 to 1992. He was the Chairman of the Advisory Committee to the Housing Department of the Government of Maharashtra and served as an advisor to the Chief Minister of Maharashtra from 1999 to 2004.

Prabhu presently serves on the board of the Slum Rehabilitation Authority and is on the Independent Monitoring Panel for World Bank Schemes in Maharashtra. Prabhu has served as the Director General of Maharashtra Economic Development Council(MEDC) and was the chairman and Consulting Editor of MEDC Economic Digest Editorial Board. He is a Fellow of the Indian Institute of Architects and Indian Institute of Interior Designers (F.I.I.A, F.I.I.I.D). He is a visiting lecturer at educational institutions in India, UK and USA and teaches Architectural Design, Urban Design, and Humanities.
