= I Thirumali =

- Occupations: educationist and Writer
- Known for: Telangana agitation

Inukonda Thirumali, or Acharya Thirumali is an Indian historian, and was an activist for separate statehood for Telangana. He is the chairman of Joint Action Committee of Telangana, Praja Sanghalu.

== Early life ==
I Thirumali did his M.A. in history at Osmania University, M.Phil. on Agrarian Relations of Telangana and Ph.D. on Telangana Peasant Movement, both from Centre for Historical Studies, Jawaharlal Nehru University.

== Career ==
I. Thirumali is a Reader in the Department of History at Sri Venkateswara College at Delhi University. He has authored books on Telangana and feudalism in Telangana.

He is the vice-president of the Telangana Intellectuals Forum, Hyderabad.

== Books by Inukonda Thirumali ==
- Against Dora And Nizam: Peoples Movement in Telangana 1939–1948
- Marriage, Love And Caste : Perceptions on Telugu Women During The Colonial Period
- South India Regions, Cultures And Sagas
- Repressed Discourses: Essays in Honour of Prof. Sabyasachi Bhattacharya

=== Research papers ===
- Dora and Gadi: Manifestation of Landlord Domination in Telangana
- Peasant Class Assertions in Nalgonda and Warangal Districts of Telangana, 1930-1946 - Indian Economic and Social History Review, 31, no 2 (1994)
