= Sanjay Haribhau Jadhav =

Indian politician

Sanjay Jadhav

Member of Parliament, Lok Sabha
- Incumbent
- Assumed office (2014-2019), (2019-2024), (2024-Present)
- Preceded by: Ganeshrao Raut Dudhgaonkar
- Constituency: Parbhani

Member of Maharashtra Legislative Assembly
- In office (2004-2009), (2009 – 2014)
- Preceded by: Tukaram Renge Patil (Shiv Sena)
- Succeeded by: Rahul Vedprakash Patil (Shiv Sena)
- Constituency: Parbhani

Personal details
- Born: 6 January 1967 (age 59) Parbhani, Maharashtra, India
- Party: Shiv Sena (June 2026-Present), (Before 2022)
- Other political affiliations: Shiv Sena(UBT) (2022-2026)
- Occupation: Activist; Politician
- As of 22 April, 2019

Sanjay Haribhau Jadhav, commonly known as Bandu Jadhav and Bandu Boss is a politician with the Shiv Sena from Parbhani in the state of Maharashtra, India.

He was elected twice, in 2004 and 2009, as MLA from Parbhani Vidhan Sabha constituency. He was also elected twice, in 2014 and 2019, as MP from Parbhani Lok Sabha constituency.

== Positions held ==
- 2004: Elected to Maharashtra Vidhan Sabha from Parbhani
- 2009: Elected to Maharashtra Legislative Assembly again from Parbhani
- 2014: Elected to 16th Lok Sabha from Parbhani Lok Sabha
- 2019: Elected to 17th Lok Sabha
- 2024 : Elected to 18th Lok Sabha

== See also ==
- Lok Sabha
