= Sheshrao Deshmukh =

Indian politician

Member of Parliament
- In office 1977–1980
- Preceded by: Shivajirao Shankarrao Deshmukh
- Succeeded by: R. N. Yadav
- Constituency: Parbhani

Personal details
- Died: 17 May 2015 (aged 85) Jawade Hospital, Parbhani, Maharashtra.
- Party: Peasants and Workers Party of India
- Spouse: Gayabai

Sheshrao Apparao Deshmukh was a member of 6th Lok Sabha of India from Parbhani parliamentary constituency of Maharashtra. He was also first member of legislative assembly of Maharashtra from Parbhani Vidhan Sabha Constituency from 1962 to 1967.

Deshmukh was known for his clean image. He is known as "Architect of Parbhani City" because of his various developmental work done during his term as corporator in Parbhani Municipal Council and also as MLA and MP. Deshmukh also was a member of the legislative assembly of Maharashtra from Jintur Vidhan Sabha constituency, serving from 1972 to 1977. Deshmukh was considered a strong leader of the Peasants and Workers Party of India from Marathwada Region.
