= Ramrao Narayanrao Yadav =

Indian politician

Ramrao Narayanrao Lonikar(Yadav) was an Indian politician. He was a member of the Indian National Congress political party from Parbhani. He was elected as Member of parliament for first in 1960 from Jalna Constituency. 4 terms in Lok Sabha representing Jalna(Lok sabha Constituency)(1960, 1962) and Parbhani (Lok Sabha Constituency)(1978, 1980) respectively. He was also elected as MLA from Partur in 1967. He had also served as MSEB and MSRTC Mahamandal president in 1978 to 1984.

He was member of 8th Lok Sabha from Parbhani (Lok Sabha constituency) in Maharashtra state, India.

He was elected to 7th, 3rd Lok Sabha and 2nd Lok Sabha from Parbhani.
