= Parbhani City Municipal Corporation =

Local civic body in Parbhani, Maharashtra, India

Type
- Type: Municipal Corporation
- Established: 2012

Leadership
- Mayor: Syed Iqbal, SS (UBT)
- Deputy Mayor: Ganesh Deshmukh INC
- Municipal Commissioner & Administrator: Devidas Pawar, IAS

Structure
- Seats: 65
- Political groups: Government (38): SS(UBT) (25); INC (12); IND (1); Opposition (27): BJP (12); NCP (11); JSS (3); YS (1)

Elections
- Last election: 15 January 2026
- Next election: 2031

Meeting place
- National Highway 222, Parbhani, Maharashtra 431401

Website
- www.pcmcparbhani.gov.in

The Parbhani Municipal Corporation is D grade Municipal Corporation of Maharashtra, the governing body of the city of Parbhani, situated beside the Collector Office, and District Court. The municipal corporation consists of democratically elected members, is headed by a mayor and administers the city's infrastructure, public services and supplies. Members from the state's leading various political parties hold elected offices in the corporation.

In 2011 Maharashtra State cabinet decided to elevate Parbhani along with Latur and Chandrapur to municipal corporation as city crossed mark of 3,00,000 population in 2011 census. First election for the Municipal Corporation was conducted in 2012, after the predecessor City Council's term ended. Parbhani Municipal Corporation has been formed with functions to improve the infrastructure of town.

== Revenue sources ==
The following are the Income sources for the Corporation from the Central and State Government.

=== Revenue from taxes ===
Following is the Tax related revenue for the corporation.

- Property tax.
- Profession tax.
- Entertainment tax.
- Grants from Central and State Government like Goods and Services Tax.
- Advertisement tax.

=== Revenue from non-tax sources ===
Following is the Non Tax related revenue for the corporation.

- Water usage charges.
- Fees from Documentation services.
- Rent received from municipal property.
- Funds from municipal bonds.

== List of Mayor ==
| # | Name | Term | | | Election | Party |
|---|---|---|---|---|---|---|
| 1 | Pratap Deshmukh | 16 May 2012 | 5 November 2014 | 2 years, 173 days | 2012 | Nationalist Congress Party |
| 2 | Sangeeta Vadkar | 5 November 2014 | 16 May 2017 | 2 years, 192 days | 2012 | Nationalist Congress Party |
| 3 | Meena Warpudkar | 16 May 2017 | 22 November 2019 | 2 years, 190 days | 2017 | Indian National Congress |
| 4 | Anita Sonkamble | 22 November 2019 | 16 May 2022 | 2 years, 175 days | 2017 | Indian National Congress |
| 5 | Syed Iqbal | 12 February 2026 | Incumbent | 227 days | 2026 | SS (UBT) |

== Election results ==
=== 2026 results ===
| Party | Seats | +/- |
|---|---|---|
| Shiv Sena (Uddhav Balasaheb Thackeray) SS(UBT) | 25 | New |
| Bharatiya Janata Party (BJP) | 12 | ▲4 |
| Indian National Congress (INC) | 12 | ▼19 |
| Nationalist Congress Party (NCP) | 11 | ▼7 |
| Independents (Ind) | 5 | ▲3 |
| Total | 65 | |

=== 2017 results ===
| Party | Seats | +/- |
|---|---|---|
| Indian National Congress (INC) | 31 | ▲8 |
| Nationalist Congress Party (NCP) | 18 | ▼12 |
| Bharatiya Janata Party (BJP) | 8 | ▲6 |
| Shiv Sena (SHS) | 6 | ▼2 |
| Independents (Ind) | 2 | Steady |
| Total | 65 | |

=== 2012 results ===
The results of the Election 2012 are as follows.

| Party | Seats |
|---|---|
| Nationalist Congress Party (NCP) | 30 |
| Indian National Congress (INC) | 23 |
| Shiv Sena (SHS) | 8 |
| Bharatiya Janata Party (BJP) | 2 |
| Independents (Ind) | 2 |
| Total | 65 |
