= Asta =

Asta may refer to:

== Companies and organizations ==
- Aerospace Technologies of Australia
- American Sail Training Association
- American Scouting Traders Association, a former name of the International Scouting Collectors Association
- American Seed Trade Association
- American Society of Travel Advisors
- American Spice Trade Association
- American String Teachers Association, for music teachers
- Association for the Treatment of Sexual Abusers
- Association of Short-Circuit Testing Authorities, a certification company acquired by Intertek in 2007
- AStA, German student representative organization
- Asta Film, a Danish film company
- ASTA Medica Onkologie, a pharmaceutical company acquired by Baxter International
- Australian School of the Arts

== People ==
- Asta (musician) (born 1994), Australian singer/songwriter
- Ásta Árnadóttir (born 1983), Icelandic footballer
- Ásta B. Gunnlaugsdóttir (born 1961), Icelandic footballer
- Ásta B. Þorsteinsdóttir (1945–1998), Icelandic politician
- Asta Backman (1917–2010), Finnish actress
- Asta Ekenvall (1913–2001), Swedish historian, librarian and academic
- Asta Gröting (born 1961), German artist
- Åsta Gudbrandsdatter (c. 975/980 – c. 1020/1030), Norse noblewomen and mother of Kings Olaf II and Harald III of Norway
- Asta Hansen (1914–1962), Danish actress
- Asta Hampe (1907–2003), German electrical and mechanical engineer and statistician
- Asta von Mallinckrodt-Haupt (1896–1960) German dermatologist
- Asta Mollerup (1881–1945), Danish dance teacher
- Asta Nielsen (1881–1972), Danish actress, star of German silent films
- Asta Nørregaard (1853–1933), Norwegian painter
- Asta Põldmäe (born 1944), Estonian writer and translator
- Asta Philpot (born 1982), American advocate of sex lives for disabled people
- Ásta Kristjana Sveinsdóttir (born 1969), Icelandic feminist philosopher and metaphysician
- Asta Vihandi (1929–1993), Estonian opera singer and actress
- Antonino Asta (born 1970), Italian former football player
- Tony Asta, guitarist for Michigan heavy metal band Battlecross
- Flavio Asta (born 1946), Italian athlete

== Places ==
- Åsta, a village in Norway
- Loch of Asta, a lake near Tingwall in Scotland
- Asta (air base), a former Soviet Air Force base in Estonia
- Asta Regia, an ancient city in the Guadalquivir valley

== Other uses ==
- 1041 Asta, an asteroid
- Asta (moth), a synonym for the moth genus Avitta
- Asta (plant), a genus in the Brassicaceae family
- ASTA-BEAB, a conformance mark
- ST Asta, a tugboat
- Asta, a fictional dog played by Skippy in the Thin Man films
- Asta (Black Clover), protagonist of the manga series Black Clover
- Cyclophosphamide, trade name: ASTA
- Wuling Asta, compact crossover SUV
- Asta, a playable character in Honkai: Star Rail
- Asta, sector kitchens brand by Jitona, n. p. branch in Český Krumlov popular in Czechoslovak Socialist Republic

== See also ==
- Astrid
- Andrea dell'Asta (1673–1721), Italian late-Baroque painter
- Astah*, a UML modeling tool
- Asti
- Ashta (disambiguation)
- Ashti (disambiguation)
- Asda (disambiguation)
- Hasta (disambiguation)
