= Daithana =

Village in Maharashtra

- Village
- Location in Maharashtra, India Daithana (India)
- Coordinates: 19°04′59″N 76°43′15″E
- Country: India
- State: Maharashtra
- District: Parbhani

Government
  - Type: Gram panchayat

Population (2011)
  - Total: 6,834
- Demonym: Daithankar

Languages
  - Official: Marathi
- Time zone: UTC+5:30 (IST)
- PIN: 431521
- Telephone code: 02452
- ISO 3166 code: IN-MH
- Vehicle registration: MH-22
- Website: maharashtra.gov.in

Daithana is a major village in Parbhani taluka of Parbhani district in Indian state of Maharashtra. Village is located on Parbhani-Gangakhed state highway, 24 km away from Parbhani city.

== Demography ==
In the population census of 2011, Daithana had 1,236 families. The village had a population of 6,834 of whom 3,499 were males and 3,335 females.

The average sex ratio of Daithana village was 953, higher than Maharashtra state average of 929.

The literacy rate of village was 72.16% compared to 82.34% of Maharashtra. Male literacy stood at 82% while female literacy rate was 62%.

Schedule Castes constituted 8% while Schedule Tribes were 1.16% of the population in the village.

Daithana is prime located village on Parbahani Gankahed road having government primary health centre with two resident medical officers. Nearby surrounding village have to come to Daithana for health care services. Kulkarni Hospital is a private hospital near the bus stand.

== Geography and transport ==
Following table shows distance of Daithana from some of major cities.

City	Distance (km)
Parbhani	24
Gangakhed	14
Nanded	71
Aurangabad	192
Mumbai	475

== Administration ==
Daithana is part of Parbhani (Lok Sabha constituency) for Indian general elections and current member of Parliament representing this constituency is Sanjay Haribhau Jadhav of Shiv Sena.

Daithana is part of Pathri (Vidhan Sabha constituency) for assembly elections of Maharashtra. Current representative from this constituency in Maharashtra state assembly is Mohan phad of Shiv Sena.

== See also ==
- Mantha
- Ashti
- Tadpangari
- Porwad
