= Ruwangan tsaman =

Traditional Kashmiri vegetarian dish

- Course: Main course
- Place of origin: Kashmir
- Region or state: Kashmir
- Serving temperature: Hot
- Main ingredients: Paneer, tomato

Ruwangan tsaman (Kashmiri pronunciation: [ruwãːɡan t͡saːman]), is a traditional Kashmiri vegetarian dish made with paneer cooked in a spiced tomato-based gravy. it is a staple in Kashmiri cuisine and is also served as a vegetarian component of the traditional multi-course meal known as Wazwan.

The dish consists of paneer cooked in a richly spiced tomato gravy, flavored with Kashmiri chili, cardamom and black cumin. It is commonly served with rice and is popular in Kashmiri households.

In Kashmiri, "ruwangun" means tomato, while "tsaman" refers to paneer.

== See also ==
- Methi maaz
- Rogan josh
- Wazwan
