= Methi maaz =

Traditional Kashmiri dish

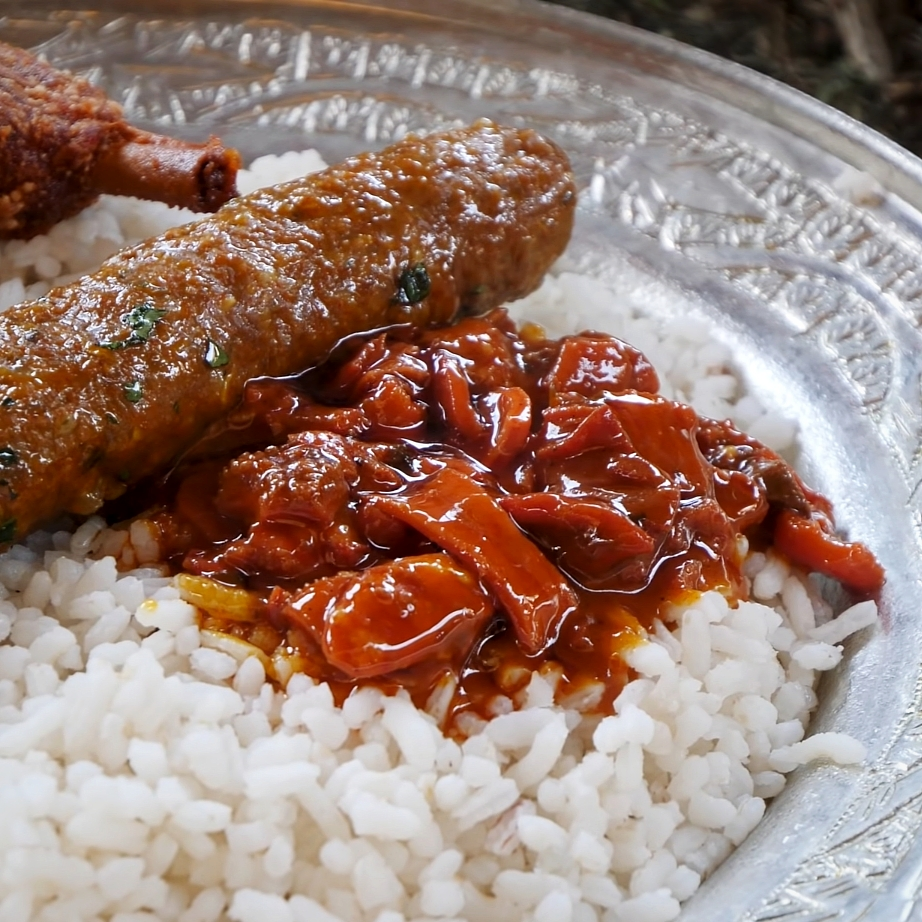
- Methi maaz served with kabab
- Course: Main course
- Place of origin: Kashmir
- Region or state: Kashmir Valley
- Serving temperature: Hot

Methi maaz (Kashmiri pronunciation: [miːt̪ʰi maːz]) is the first dish of the traditional Kashmiri wazwan, a multi-course meal in Kashmiri cuisine. This dish is named after its two prominent ingredients: methi (fenugreek) and maaz (meat). Traditionally, the meat used in methi maaz is a combination of minced tripe, lamb stomach, and intestine, which are flavored with Kashmiri chili and curd. The dish is known for its unique taste and is a significant part of Kashmiri culinary heritage.

Methi is the typical appetizer of wazwan, a mutton dish served along with tabak maaz and kebab on a trami and covered with a sarposh.

== Preparation ==
The tripe or lamb stomach and intestine are boiled, then finely chopped with a heavy knife on a wooden log (called a mound in Kashmiri). The waza marinates the mutton in a mixture of yogurt and spices, which include cumin, coriander, ginger, garlic, and Kashmiri red chili powder. The meat is then added to the deg and cooked in ghee over low heat along with fresh fenugreek leaves until it is tender and the flavors have melded together.

== See also ==
- Goshtaab: Traditional Kashmiri meatball dish
- Rogan josh: Kashmiri lamb curry
