= Daniwal korme =

Traditional Kashmiri dish

- Course: Main course
- Place of origin: Kashmir
- Region or state: Kashmir Valley
- Serving temperature: Hot
- Main ingredients: Mutton, coriander

Daniwal Korme (Kashmiri pronunciation: [d̪aːniʋal qɔrmɨ]) is a traditional Kashmiri dish made with lamb or mutton, cooked in a yogurt-based gravy flavored with fresh coriander leaves. The process involves braising the meat in the rich sauce. It is a staple of the Kashmiri Wazwan, the traditional multi-course ceremonial meal of Kashmir.

In Kashmiri, "daniwal" means coriander, while "korme" or "korma" refers to braise.

== See also ==
- Wazwan
- Rogan josh
- Goshtaab
