= Aab gosh =

Traditional Kashmiri dish made from lamb

Abb Gosh
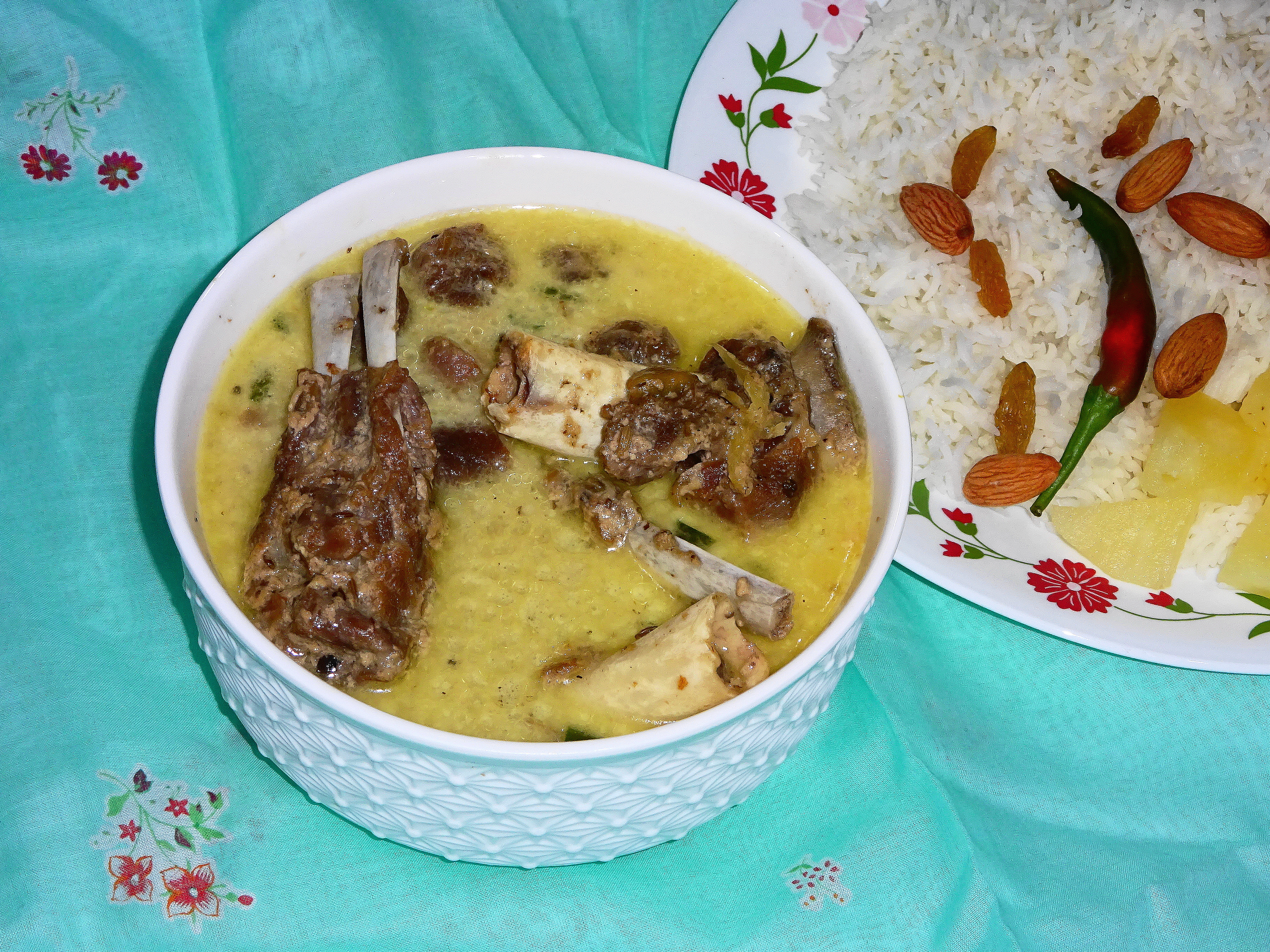
- Abb Gosh
- Course: Main course
- Place of origin: Kashmir
- Region or state: Kashmir
- Serving temperature: Hot
- Main ingredients: Lamb, milk

Aab Gosh (Kashmiri pronunciation: [aːb ɡoːʃ]) is a traditional Kashmiri mutton curry made with tender pieces of lamb cooked in a milk-based gravy. It is a popular dish in Kashmiri cuisine and is commonly served as part of the traditional multi-course meal called Wazwan.

== See also ==
- Wazwan
- Rogan josh
- Goshtaab
