= Asda (disambiguation) =

Asda is a British supermarket chain.

Asda may also refer to:

== Organisations ==
- American Stamp Dealers Association, a philatelic society (founded 1914)
- American Student Dental Association, a body for student dentists (founded 1971)
- Australian Screen Directors' Association, a former name of the Australian Directors' Guild
- Australian Soft Drinks Association, a former name of the trade group Australian Beverages Council
- Party of Democratic Activity (A-SDA), a Bosnian political party (2008–2021)

== Other uses ==
- Asda Jayanama (born 1949), a Thai diplomat
- Asda Story, a 2008 MMORPG video game
- Accelerate-stop distance available to abort an aircraft take-off

== See also ==
- Asta, a fictional dog in the Thin Man films
- Asta (disambiguation)
- ADSA (disambiguation)
