= Tabak maaz =

Traditional Kashmiri dish made from lamb ribs

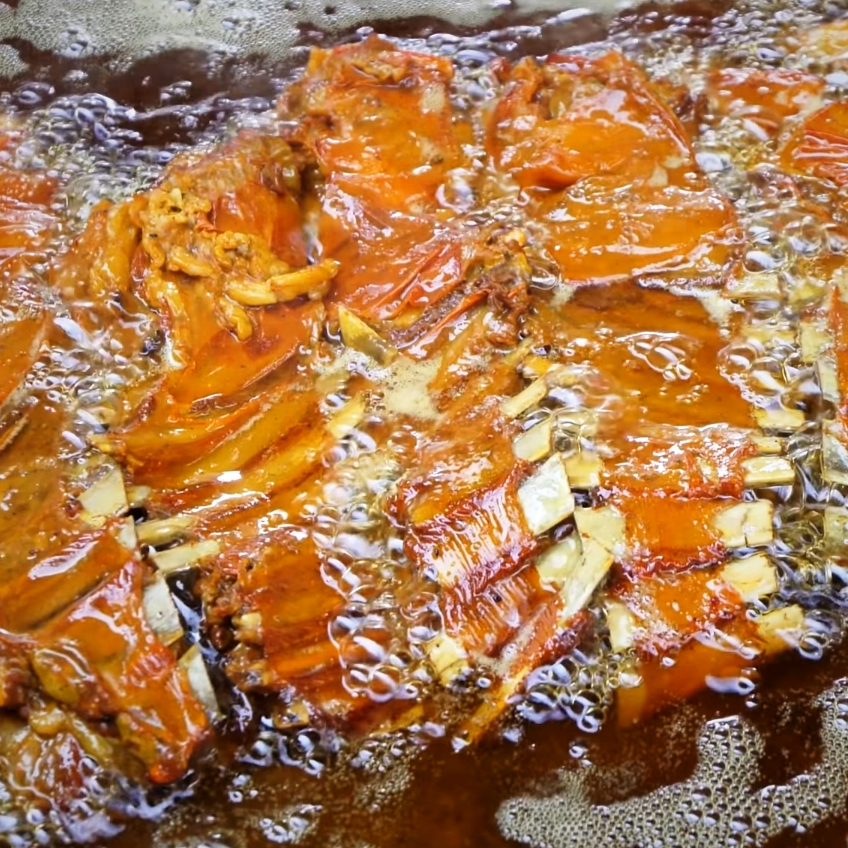
- Tabak maaz, a traditional Kashmiri dish
- Alternative names: Qabargah
- Course: Main course
- Place of origin: Kashmir
- Region or state: Kashmir
- Serving temperature: Hot
- Main ingredients: Lamb ribs, milk, ghee, spices

Tabak maaz (Kashmiri pronunciation: [tabaq maːz]), also called qabargah (Kashmiri pronunciation: [qabarɡaːh]) is a traditional Kashmiri dish made from lamb ribs that are simmered in milk and spices and then fried. It is often served during special occasions, festivals, and as part of the traditional multi-course meal known as wazwan.

== See also ==
- Goshtaab: Traditional Kashmiri meatball dish
- Rogan josh: Kashmiri lamb curry
