= Health Star Rating System =

Food label system in Australia and New Zealand

- Formation: June 2014; 12 years ago
- Type: Government, Non-profit
- Purpose: Rating the healthiness of packaged foods and beverages
- Region served: Australia and New Zealand
- Website: www.healthstarrating.gov.au

The Health Star Rating System (HSR) is an Australian and New Zealand Government initiative that assigns health ratings to packaged foods and beverages. The purpose for the Health Star Rating is to provide a visual comparison of like for like products, to assist consumers into distinguishing and choosing the healthier options. It was designed to target time-deprived working adults as well as parents and children who were less likely to check how healthy each individual product was, through examination of the nutritional information panel on the back of products.

Ratings scale by half star increments between half a star up to five stars, with the higher the rating, the healthier the product. These scores are determined through the use of the Health Star Rating Calculator, which was created by the federal and state governments in collaboration with leading health industry, consumer groups and expert nutritionists. The calculator uses nutritional information to obtain a rating for the product. Points are added for "healthy" nutrients including fibre, protein and fruit, vegetable, nut and legume content; whilst points are deducted for "unhealthy" nutrients: energy, saturated fat, sodium and sugar. These are nutrients that have been scientifically linked to chronic health disease. Companies can display the HSR rating with or without additional nutrient icons.

The Health Star Rating has received criticism over the voluntary nature of the system, and how some companies have potentially manipulated its use. The system underwent a major review after five years of implementation, resulting in a number of improvements including stronger penalties for sugar and sodium content, and the removal of the ability for companies to display a label showing the energy content only (without a star rating).

In February 2026, Food Ministers from Australia and New Zealand met and agreed to ask Food Standards Australia New Zealand to prepare a proposal on mandating the HSR system. This followed findings that uptake of the HSR system has fallen short of voluntary targets set by Food Ministers in 2020.

== History ==
In 2009, the Australia and New Zealand Food Regulation Ministerial Council (now the Food Ministers' Meeting) commissioned former Australian Health Minister Neal Blewett to lead a review on food labelling policy. The review, which was released in 2011, recommended a front of pack labelling system based on a nutrition policy. Following agreement to this recommendation by the Council, a group composed of government, food manufacturing and retail industry, government, public health and consumer representatives was assembled to design and implement the system. The group agreed on using star ratings at its first meeting.

The Health Star Rating System was introduced in June 2014 on a voluntary basis in Australia and New Zealand. The rating is free to use for any applicable products as long as due process is followed and the correct rating is displayed.

Two formal reviews of the system have been undertaken to date. A review after two years of operation was undertaken in 2016. This review was conducted by the Health Star Rating Advisory Committee. Its report was published in 2017.

Between 2017 and 2019 an independent review of the system after five years of implementation was undertaken (the “Five Year review”). Matthews Pegg Consulting (mpconsulting) was engaged to lead this review. A Technical Advisory Group was also created to review and analyse the overall performance of the HSR Calculator. The review was finalised in May 2019, and made 10 recommendations for the future of the system. These included a suite of changes to the calculator, minor governance changes, and that the system remain voluntary for a further five years but with clear uptake targets. Food Ministers accepted the recommendations.

The Australian Government has run a number of media campaigns on behalf of the system in Australia between 2014 and 2023 to further educate consumers and promote the use of the system. Posters, radio advertisements, TV advertisements and YouTube videos have all been created to assist in growing the system by providing further information in an educating manner to all potential consumers. In June 2023 the latest phase of the media campaign was released, with an emphasis on targeting visual media platforms.

In July 2021, the Tim Tam got a 0.5 Health Star Rating, attracting media attention.

=== Partners ===
The Health Star Rating was designed and created through the collaborative efforts of multiple organisations. Whilst funded by the governments of Australia and New Zealand, these external groups assisted in the creation process helping with the aesthetic design, the public consumer marketing, the implementation process and style guides.

- Australian Beverages Council
- Australian Chronic Disease Prevention Alliance
- Australian Food and Grocery Council
- Australian Industry Group
- Australian Medical Association
- Choice
- Obesity Policy Coalition (now known as the Food for Health Alliance)
- Public Health Association of Australia

== Calculating the Star Rating ==
The Health Star Rating is a star rating system which works on half-star increments. A calculator was created so that each valid product could input their key nutritional values into the calculator and a star rating would be determined. The calculator works via an algorithm that was developed through the consultation of a variety of nutritional and technical experts along with Food Standards Australia New Zealand. The producers of the product applying the Star Rating are responsible for using the correct information and displaying the appropriate star score.

The calculator is available in two formats—an online application and a Microsoft Excel spreadsheet. Both of these calculators are available for use on the official Health Star Rating website and are accessible to anyone. The Health Star Rating Implementation Guide outlines the steps required in evaluating a products score. A rating can also be calculated manually, using the points tables available in the Implementation Guide.

Before inputting the standard nutritional data, the calculator requires a food category to be selected. There are six categories to select from: Category 1 is for non-dairy beverages, including jellies and ice confection; Category 1D is for dairy beverages; Category 2 is for all foods other than those included in other categories; Category 2D is for dairy foods such as yoghurt and some spreadable cheeses; Category 3 is for oils and oil-based spreads; and Category 3D is for cheeses.

The second step is to input the product's values for saturated fat, energy, total sugars and sodium. All numbers for nutritional composition are based upon per 100 mL or 100 g as displayed on any Nutrition Information Panel. These nutritional elements are those typically linked with chronic health disease and are called "risk factors". A baseline nutrient score will be calculated based upon the inputs provided with points 'earned' based upon where they lie on the industry guideline tables.

The calculator then takes into account health-beneficial ingredients: fruits, vegetables, nuts, legumes content (FVNL) (as a percentage of the product); protein, and fibre. This will provide the product with its modifying points. The total for modifying points is subtracted from the baseline nutrient points and is then converted to a final score for the product.

== Uptake ==
Due to the voluntary nature of the Health Star Rating, the industry uptake has been closely monitored since its inception. From the establishment of the system until the Five Year Review (2019), monitoring of the system in Australia was undertaken by the National Heart Foundation of Australia; and in New Zealand by the New Zealand Ministry for Primary Industries. At this time, uptake was monitored as a percentage of eligible products. The Five Year Review report found that as at June 2018, the Health Star Rating appeared on approximately 31% of eligible products (5,448 products) in Australia, and 21% of eligible products (2,997 products) in New Zealand.

Following the Five Year Review of the system, Food Ministers set uptake targets for the system, and agreed that if uptake does not reach at least 70% of intended products by November 2025, they would consider mandating the system In February 2026, a report on uptake was released, indicating that uptake had reached 39% of intended products in Australia and 36% of intended products in New Zealand. These figures should not be compared to pre-Review monitoring due to differing methodologies.

A study conducted in 2017 from the Nutrients journal found that 4348 out of 15,767 (28%) eligible products were displaying the HSR logo. Major retailers Woolworths, Coles, and Aldi were the source of the vast majority of participating products. The results displayed that uptake was on the rise since the inception of the system. The study found that participating products had a higher average HSR as compared to non-participating eligible products. The study surmised that this was due to companies using the HSR as a marketing tool or avoiding the system if it displayed a poor rating for their products. With the exception of Coles, Woolworths and Arnott's, manufacturers were on average displaying the logo on their higher scoring products. Woolworths has strongly supported the initiative and has committed to applying the HSR to all Woolworths branded items.

== Controversies ==
=== Nestle's Milo case ===
Prior to changes introduced in 2020, products which required further preparation prior to consumption were able to calculate their Health Star Rating based on the final form of the product, ie, the product ‘as prepared’.

The Health Star Rating received criticism for some of the ratings which used the 'as prepared' rule to increase their ratings. One such case was with Nestle's Milo, which received a rating of 4.5 stars with the rating calculated on the basis of its preparation with skim milk. Some people took issue with this as they stated that it was a misleading score as the rating was based upon 200 mL of skim milk being added for every three teaspoons of Milo. Public health groups found this to be a method of bypassing the system in order to obtain favourable scores for products which may actually be unhealthy.

This particular issue was rectified in 2018 with Nestle removing Milo from the HSR. Nestle maintained the status that they had been compliant with food regulation standards but did not wish to confuse consumers. Some groups including Choice, an Australian Consumer campaigning group, have said that Nestle should reinstate the HSR but with the re-adjudicated score of 1.5 stars.

=== Ratings' accuracy ===
Due to the voluntary nature of the system, there has been discussion that some companies are using this to their advantage by adding the logo only to their higher-rating products. Professor Mark Lawrence of Deakin University whose research focuses on public health nutrition, had this to say on the matter. "You can pick and choose. If it suits your interest, you would put the stars on. But if it doesn't then you can fly under the radar." This has led for some to call on the Health Star Rating to be mandatory across all applicable items, to avoid potential distortion of the system. Food Ministers indicated they would consider introducing a mandatory policy in the future during its initial release but consumer groups are still concerned that the system is performing below its capabilities until this occurs. On 13 February 2026, Food Ministers asked Food Standards Australia New Zealand to prepare a Proposal on mandating the system.

The Health Star Rating Calculator has been questioned in its application of sugar in the equation used to create a rating score. Currently, the calculator simply adds the total amount of sugar contained in an individual product but a Journal of the Academy of Nutrition and Dietetics article discussed the possibility of distinguishing natural sugars and added sugars when determining HSR scores. It was found that when the scores were recalculated under the proposed method, approximately 7.3% of products received a score of under 3.5 stars compared to the traditional method where the products score was over 3.5 stars. Nutrition Australia, an independent health organisation, campaigned for greater scope when calculating the scores, particularly where dairy and naturally higher occurring fat products are involved such as avocados. The CEO of the Victorian Division had this to say on the topic. "It's imperative that the Health Star Rating makes changes now, to score foods and drinks better so that everyday Aussies can confidently select nutritious options from the five core food groups, and avoid sneaky and misleading unhealthy options." Milk is an example of one such product which contains high levels of natural sugars (lactose) but is considered a core part of a healthy diet. These discrepancies have caused controversy in how the HSR calculates its scores for certain products.

== See also ==
- Healthcare in Australia
- Healthcare in New Zealand
- Food and Nutrition Service
- List of food labeling regulations
