= Ashta =

Ashta may refer to:

- Ashta: Middle Eastern dairy product

== Geography ==
- Ashta, Bangladesh
- Ashta, Madhya Pradesh, a municipality in Sehore district in the state of Madhya Pradesh, India
  - Ashta (Vidhan Sabha constituency), Madhya Pradesh
- Ashta, Maharashtra, a city in Sangli district in the state of Maharashtra, India
- Ashta, a village in Beed District, Maharashtra, India

== Places ==
- Ashta District 8, a high-end shopping mall in Jakarta, Indonesia

== See also ==
- Asta (disambiguation)
- Ashti (disambiguation)
