= ADSA =

Adsa is a village in Bangladesh.

ADSA may refer to:

- American Dairy Science Association
- American Dental Society of Anesthesiology
- Australasian Association for Theatre, Drama and Performance Studies
- Automatic Dependent Surveillance-Addressed (ADS-A)

== See also ==
- Asda (disambiguation)
