= Tadpangari, Parbhani =

Village in Maharashtra

Tadpangari Vairagarabad
- Village
- Nickname: Tadeshwar Nagar
- Location in Maharashtra, India Tadpangari (India)
- Coordinates: 19°08′20″N 76°44′11″E
- Country: India
- State: Maharashtra
- District: Parbhani
- Established: 1784
- Founder: Sinhalal Vairagar, Kisannadu Anchintam ( Yerralu Dynasty)

Government
  - Type: Gram panchayat
  - Body: Gramsevak
  - Rank: demographics1_title1
- Elevation: 414 m (1,358 ft)

Population (2011)
  - Total: 1,610
- Demonym: Tadpangarikar

Languages
  - Official: Marathi, telgu
- Time zone: UTC+5:30 (IST)
- PIN: 431509
- Telephone code: 02452
- ISO 3166 code: IN-MH
- Vehicle registration: MH-22
- Website: maharashtra.gov.in

Tadpangari is a village in Parbhani taluka of Parbhani district in Indian state of Maharashtra. Village has a health Sub-centre which works under Primary Health Centre of Daithana. Village is located on Parbhani-Gangakhed state highway. The history of tadpangari is very old in 1690 the tadeshwar temple is exist in tadpangari but in 18th century this temple destroyed by mughal tadeshwar temple is a temple of lord tadeshwar, tadeshwar is a one god in hinduism.

== History ==
In 11th century tadeshwar temple was built by vasant indapalli he was from Tirumala Tirupati vasant indapalli was devotee of Lord Shiva he went to sleep once at night Lord Shiva came in his dream and said "vasant you are my devotee you worship me every day i am happy with you what you want?" vasant said "Lord Shiva i want you near me I want you near me so I want to build the Tadeshwar temple for this temple please give me some money." Lord Shiva said "No problem, take this money and worship me." After this Lord Shiva disappeared. Later this temple was given to the king of Vijayanagara in the year 1384. Infiltrators attacked the temple several times but the king of Vijayanagara did not allow the temple to be destroyed. Tadpangri was later attacked by the Deccan kingdom. In year 1630 tadeshwar temple was distroyed by mughal

== Demography ==
As per 2011 census, Tadpangari had total population of 1,610 residing in 301 families, of which 841 were males while 769 were females. Average Sex ratio was 914 with 40%.50% literacy rate. Male literacy was 50%.32%% while female literacy rate was 61.45%.

== See also ==
- Daithana
