= Ranisawargaon =

Village in Maharashtra

- Village
- Location in Maharashtra, India Ranisawargaon (India)
- Coordinates: 18.96546°N 76.749293°E
- Country: India
- State: Maharashtra
- District: Parbhani

Government
  - Type: Gram panchayat
- Elevation: 392 m (1,286 ft)

Population (2011)
  - Total: 8,758
- Demonym: Sawargaonkar

Languages
  - Official: Marathi
- Time zone: UTC+5:30 (IST)
- PIN: 431536
- Telephone code: 02453
- ISO 3166 code: IN-MH
- Vehicle registration: MH-22

Ranisawargaon also Rani Sawargaon, is a major village in Gangakhed taluka of Parbhani district in Indian state of Maharashtra.

== Demography ==
Ranisawargaon has total 1728 families residing. The village has population of 8,758 of which 4,480 are males while 4,278 are females as per Population Census 2011.

Average Sex Ratio of village is 955 which is higher than Maharashtra state average of 929.

Ranisawargaon village has lower literacy rate compared to Maharashtra. In 2011, literacy rate of village was 74.76% compared to 82.34% of Maharashtra. Male literacy stands at 84.25% while female literacy rate was 65%.

Schedule Caste (SC) constitutes 11.7% while Schedule Tribe (ST) were 0.39% of total population in village.

== Transport ==
Distance of Ranisawargaon village from nearby cities is as following. Rani Sawargaon is well connected by road to Gangakhed, Palam, Nanded and Ahmedpur.

Nearest railway station is Gangakhed and nearest airports are Nanded Airport and Latur Airport.

City	Distance(km)
Gangakhed	21
Palam	25
Parli	51
Parbhani	65
Ahmedpur	21
Loha	43
Aurangabad	212
Mumbai	479
Nanded	67

== Administration ==
As per constitution of India and Panchyati Raaj Act, Ranisawargaon village is administrated by Sarpanch (Head of Village) who is elected representative of village.
