= Wazwan =

Meal in Kashmiri cuisine

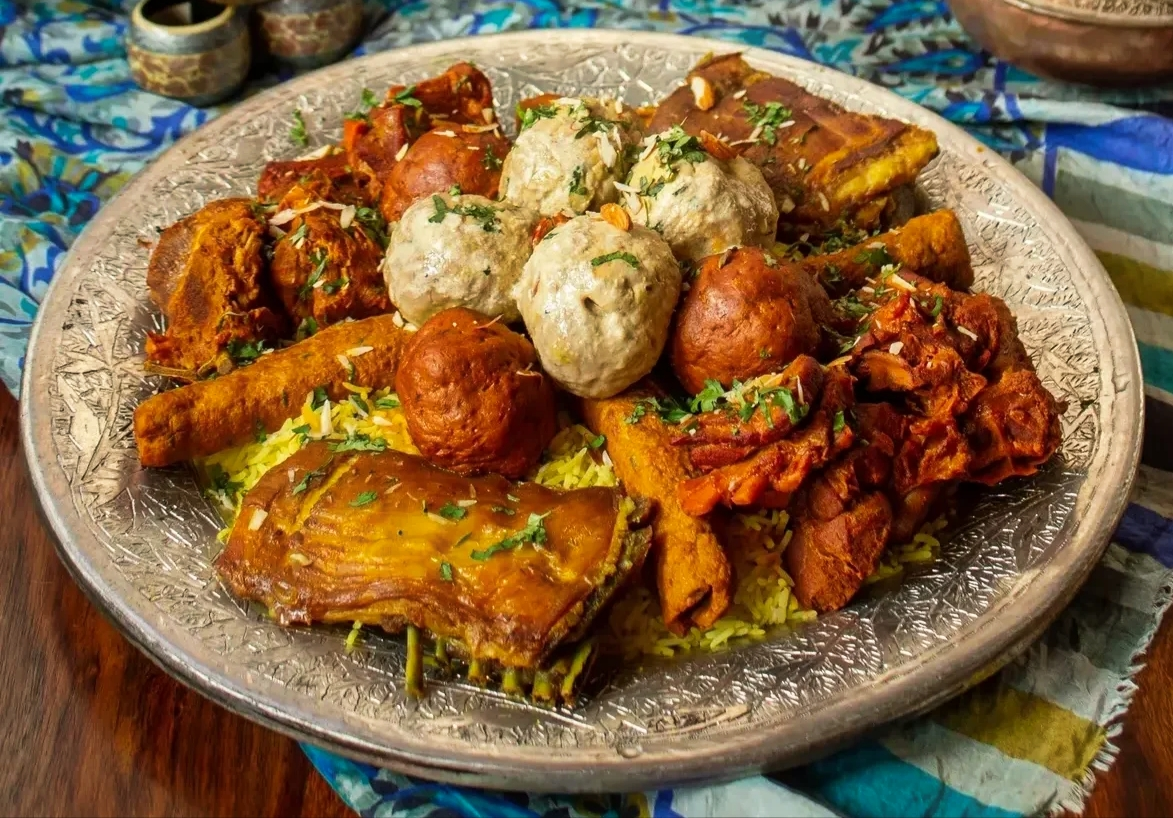
- Complete wazwan on one platter (or trạ̄m). This is usually presented to the would-be in-laws before/on the day of the marriage.
- Place of origin: Kashmir
- Region or state: Kashmir Valley
- Serving temperature: Hot
- Main ingredients: Mutton

Wazwan (Kashmiri pronunciation: [ʋaːzɨʋaːn]) is a multi-course meal in Kashmiri cuisine, originating from Kashmir.

Almost all the dishes are meat-based using lamb, beef or mutton with few vegetarian dishes. It is popular throughout the larger Kashmir region. Moreover, Wazwan is also served internationally at Kashmiri food festivals and reunions. All dishes are prepared according to halal standards. For vegetarians, there are distinctive delicacies such as Dum Alve, Nadur (lotus stem), Haakh (collard greens). Kashmiri vegetarian pulao is often included - a flavorful dish prepared with aromatic Kashmiri spices, vegetables, and a mix of dried fruits.

== History ==
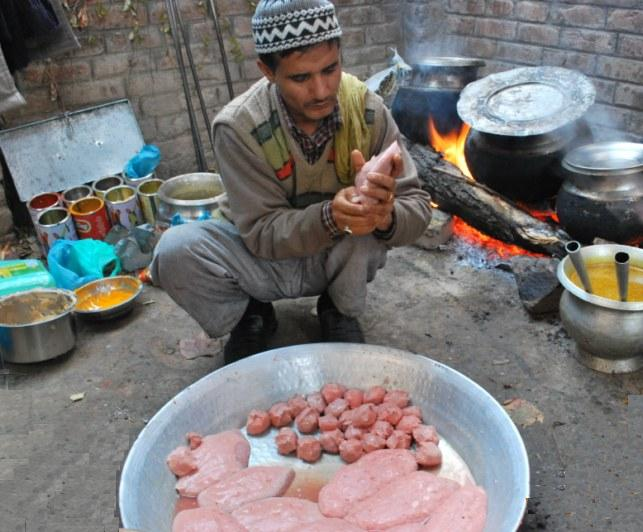
Waza preparing rista

In the Kashmiri language, waz means 'cook' or 'cooking' and wan means 'shop'. The ultimate formal banquet in Kashmir is the royal wazwan. Of its thirty-six courses, between fifteen and thirty can be preparations of meat, cooked overnight under the supervision of a master chef called a wouste waze. Guests are seated in groups of four and share the meal out of a large copper plate called the traem. A ritual washing of hands in a portable basin called the Tash-t-naer, which is taken around by attendants. Then the traem arrives, heaped with rice, quartered by two seekh kababs and contains four pieces of methi maaz, (mutton intestines flavored with a spice mixture containing dried fenugreek (methi) leaves), two tabakh maaz (twice-cooked lamb ribs, initially braised with ground spices, then browned in ghee), one safed kokur (chicken with white sauce), one zafran kokur (chicken with saffron sauce), and the first few courses. Yogurt and chutney are served separately in small earthen pots. Up to about 20 items are served thereafter by waza (the junior cook). Seven dishes are a must for these occasions — tabakh maaz, rista (meatballs in a red, paprika-saffron-fennel spice gravy colored with dyer's alkanet), rogan josh, daniwal korma (lamb roasted with yoghurt, spices and onion puree, topped with coriander leaves), aab gosh (lamb chunks cooked with a fennel-based spice mixture, cardamom and partially evaporated milk), marchhwangan korma (chicken legs/thighs cooked in a spicy browned-onion sauce) and gushtaba (meatballs cooked in a spicy yoghurt gravy). The main course usually ends with gushtaba. The gushtaba is a large meatball which signals the end of the main course. After that, desserts are served. In winters, the dessert can be a hot sweet dish and in summers, it is usually something cold. Although traditionally only available as a large feast serving dozens or hundreds of guests, in recent years restaurants offering the iconic wazwan dishes by the plate have sprang up in Cashmere, many of them run by the hereditary waza cooks who honed their skills serving banquets.

== List of main dishes ==
- Methi Maaz (Tripe cooked with spices)
- Riste (meatballs in a fiery red gravy)
- Waze kokur (two halves or two full chicken cooked whole)
- Dani Phol (mutton dish, drum stick)
- Rogan josh (tender lamb cooked with Kashmiri spices)
- Tabak maaz (ribs of lamb simmered in yogurt till tender, then fried)
- Daniwal korme (a mutton curry with coriander)
- Waze palak, Waze Hak & Waze Header (green spinach, collards and mushrooms cooked by a Waze)
- Aab gosh (lamb cooked in sweet milk curry)
- Martsewagan korme (an extremely spicy lamb dish)
- Kabab (minced meat roasted on skewers over hot coals)
- Goshtaab (a velvety textured meatball in white yogurt gravy; the gravy is called yekin or doud ras)
- Yakhin (curd gravy, typically prepared with Goshtab although it is also part of other dishes)
- Ruwangan chaman (paneer pieces fried and then cooked with tomato gravy)
- Dum aelve (potatoes cooked in yogurt gravy; it is rare)
- Gande tsitin (Onion Chutney) (chopped onions mixed with chilies, salt, yogurt and spices)
- Muji chetin (radish and walnut chutney)
Wazwan varieties

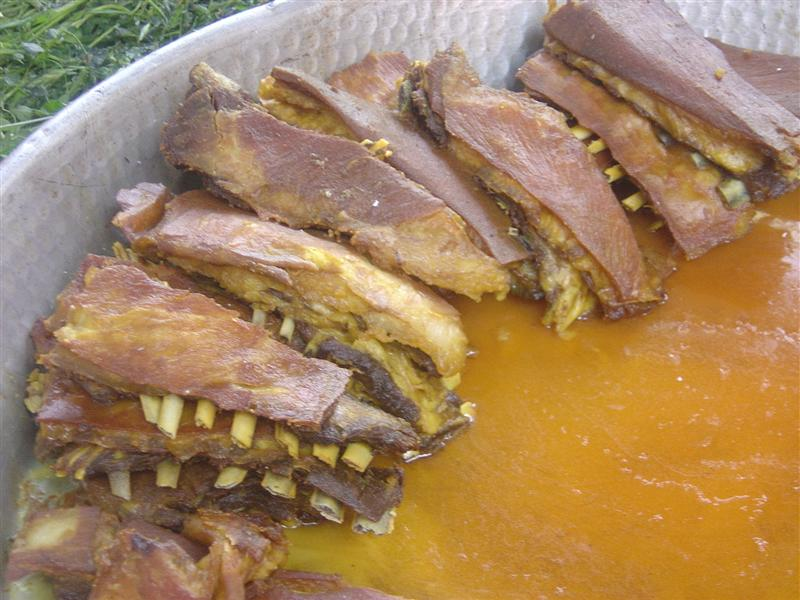
Tabak maaz

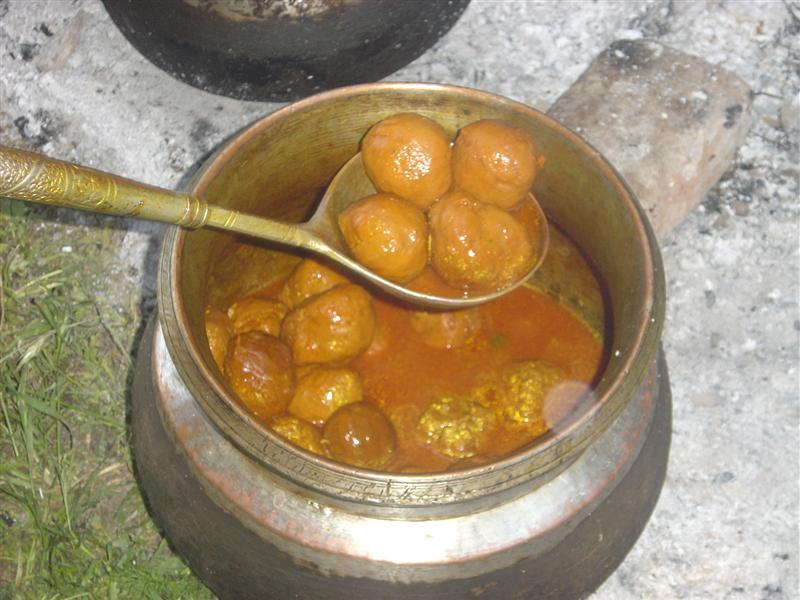
Riste

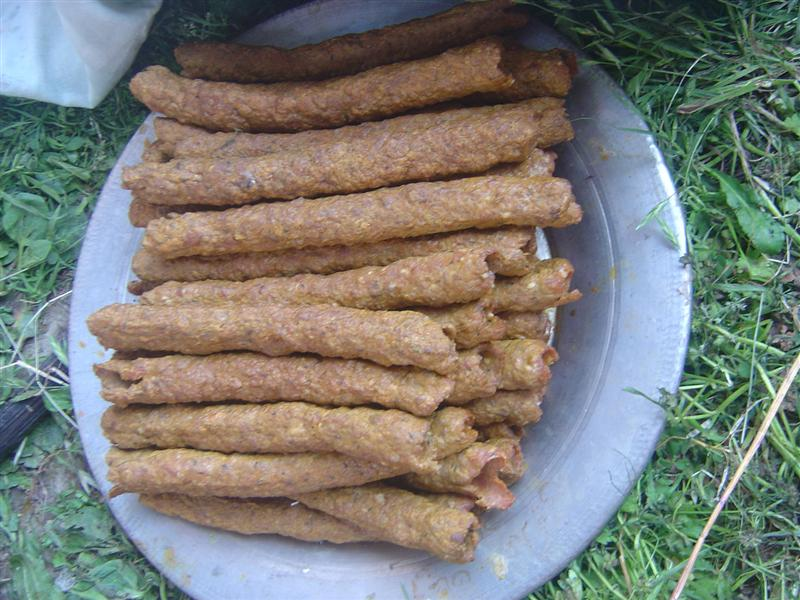
Kabab

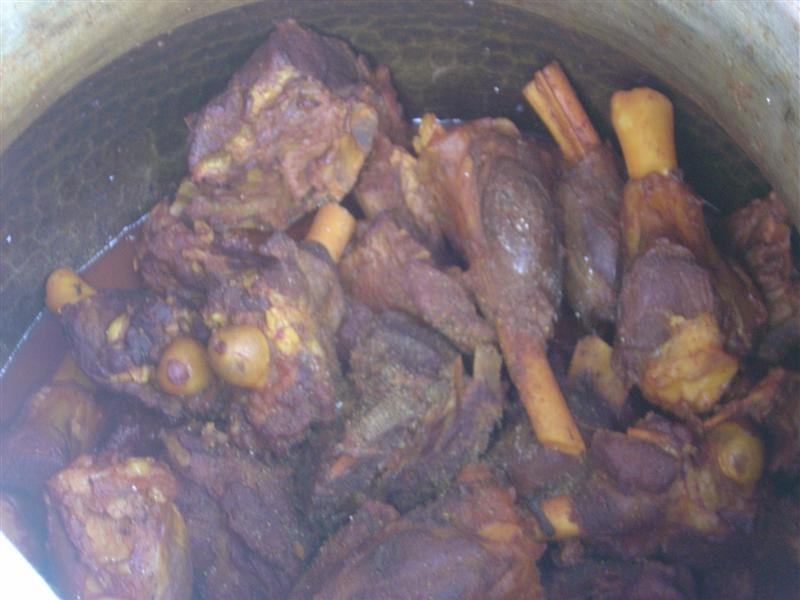
Dani Phol

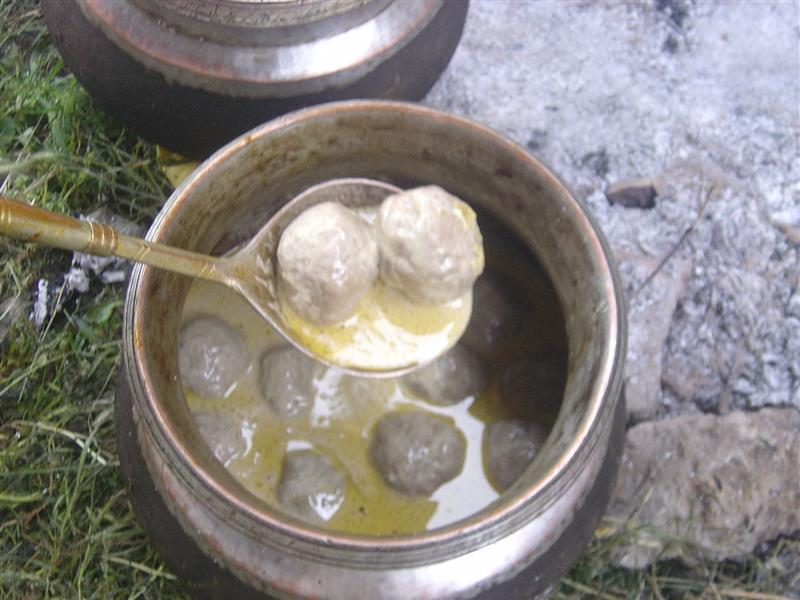
Gushtaab

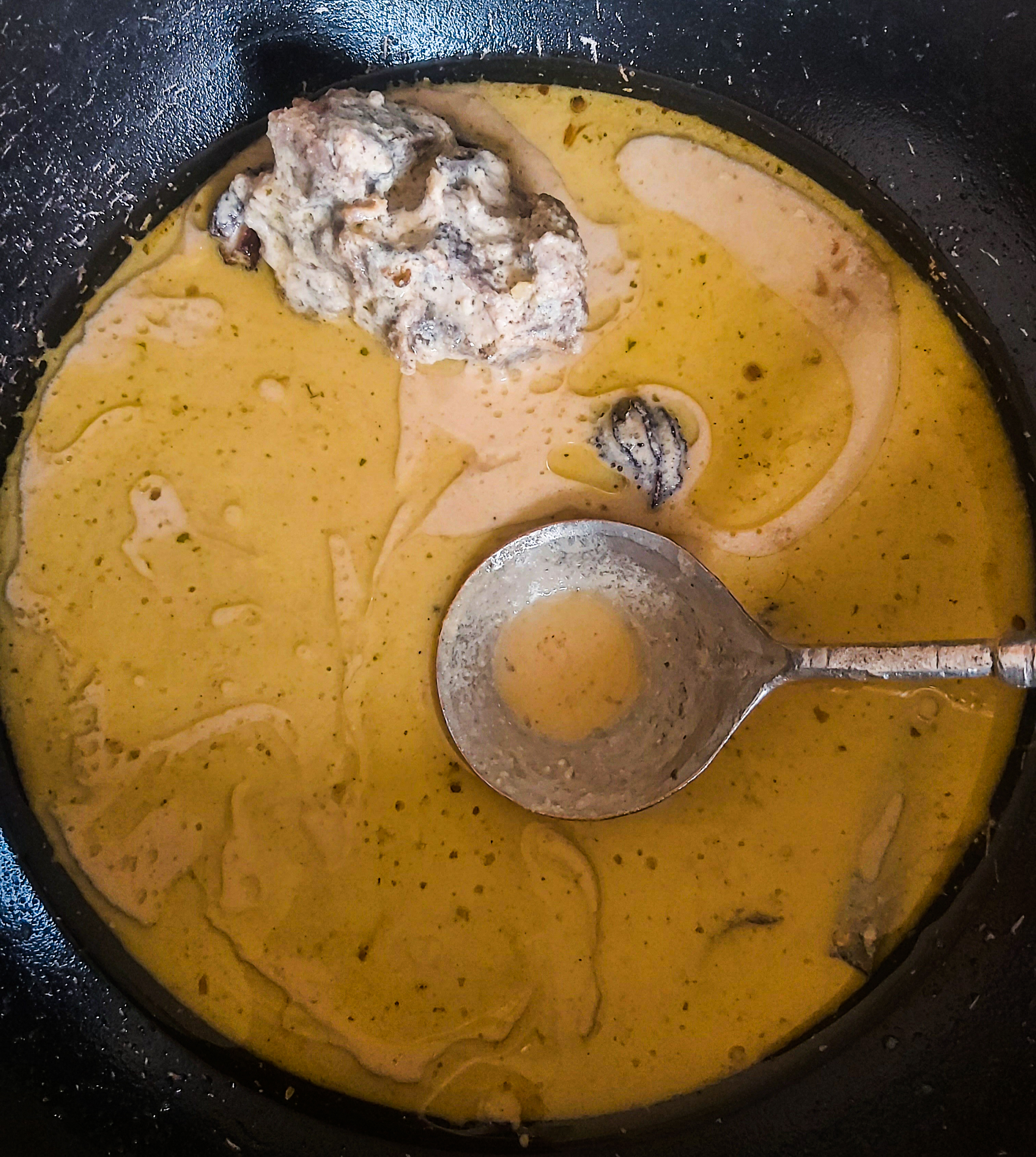
Yakhin

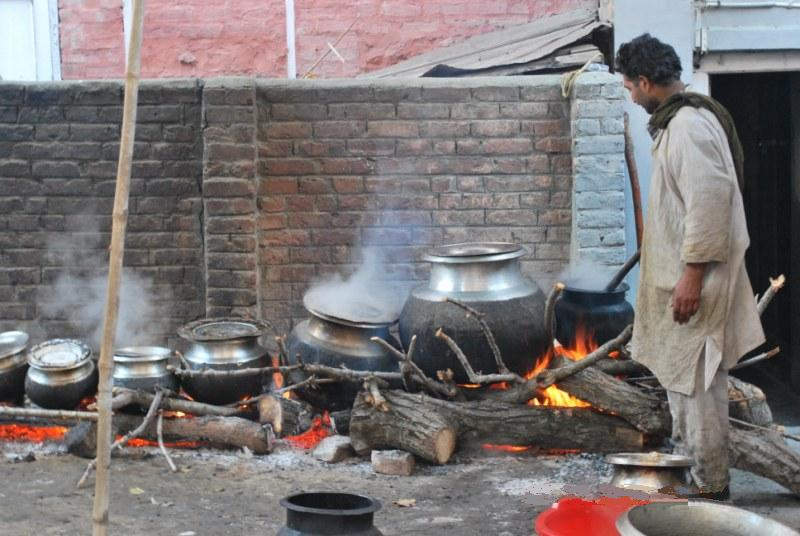
Preparation of wazwan

== See also ==
- Kanger
- Kashmiri cuisine
- Kashmiri literature
- Kashmiriyat
- List of chicken dishes
- List of lamb dishes
- Noon Chai
