= Palam, Parbhani =

Taluka in Parbhani district, Maharashtra, India

Palam पालम
- Town
- Location in Maharashtra, India
- Coordinates: 19°0′37″N 76°57′4″E
- Country: India
- State: Maharashtra
- District: Parbhani

Government
  - Type: Taluka place
- Elevation: 384 m (1,260 ft)

Population (2011)
  - Total: 14,286
- Demonym: Palamkar

Languages
  - Official: Marathi
- Time zone: UTC+5:30 (IST)
- Postal code: 431720
- Vehicle registration: MH-22
- Website: parbhani.gov.in

Palam is a town and headquarters of Palam taluka. It is located in Parbhani district in the Indian state of Maharashtra.

Palam taluka in Parbhani district has total 82 villages, and some nearest villages are Peth Pimpalgaon, Anjanwadi, and Sarfrajpur.

== Demographics ==
Palam town has population of 14,286 of which 7,335 are males while 6,951 are females as per Population Census 2011.

The sex ratio of Palam is 948 females per 1,000 males which is higher than the Maharashtra average of 929.

Palam has lower literacy compared to Maharashtra. In 2011, literacy rate was 76.30% compared to 82.34% of Maharashtra. Male literacy was 84.33% while female literacy rate was 67.96%.

The Schedule Caste population constitutes 13.36%, while Schedule Tribes were 1.84%.

== Transport ==
Palam is located 38 km (24 mi) south of district headquarters Parbhani.

Loha 21 km (13 mi), Purna 23 km (14 mi), Gangakhed 24 km (15 mi), Nanded 60 km (37 mi) are other nearby cities connected by road.

The nearest railway stations are Gangakhed and Purna.

== Notable places ==
- Oldest temple: Khandoba Mandir, Palam

== Education ==
- Mamata Prathamik Vidyalay, Palam (Classes 1–7)
- Mamata Madyamik Vidyalay, Palam (Classes 5–12)

== Governance ==
Palam comes under Parbhani (Lok Sabha constituency). The member of Parliament representing this constituency is Sanjay Haribhau Jadhav of Shiv Sena.

Palam comes under Gangakhed (Vidhan Sabha constituency) for assembly elections. The representative from this constituency Ratnakar Gutte (Kaka) of Rashtriya Samaj Paksh.
