= Riste (dish) =

Kashmiri meat dish

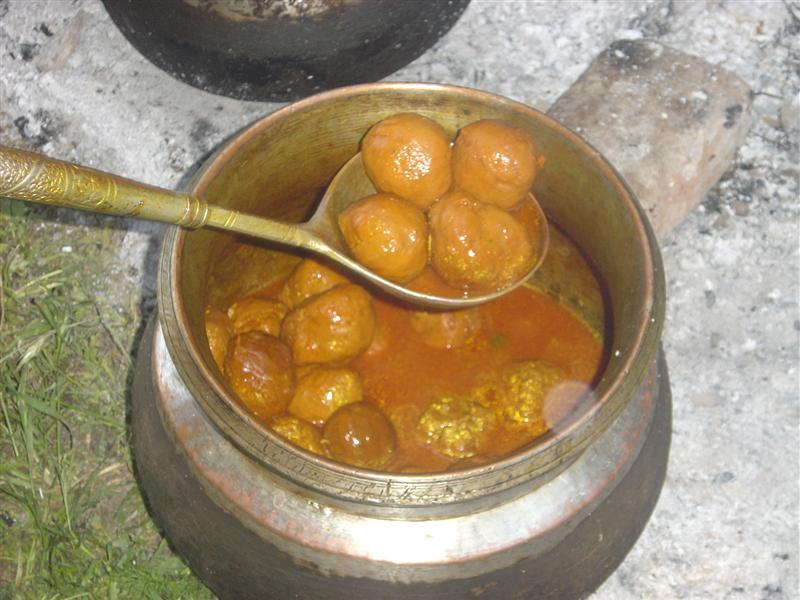
- Riste
- Course: Wazwan; Main
- Place of origin: Kashmir
- Region or state: Kashmir
- Serving temperature: Hot

Riste (Kashmiri pronunciation: [rist̪ɨ]), also spelled rista, is a Kashmiri meatball dish made from mutton, beef, and rarely from chicken. It is an important part of Kashmiri wazwan.

Ground meat is combined with spices and eggs, then rolled by hand into balls, which are cooked in hot water for half an hour and then boiled in gravy.

== See also ==
- Kashmiri cuisine
- List of meatball dishes
