= Palam taluka =

Coordinates: 19°00′37″N 76°57′04″E

Palam taluka is one of the nine talukas in Parbhani district. Palam is the headquarter of Palam taluka.

There are 82 villages in Palam Taluka.

In this taluka there are 2 famous shrines Shri Sant Nivrutti Maharaj shrine in Pendu (BK) village and Shri Sant Motiram Maharaj Shrine at Phala Village.

== Demography ==
Palam taluka has population of 115,382 of which 59,737 are males while 55,645 are females.

The average sex ratio of Palam Taluka is 931 which is higher than Maharashtra state average of 929.

The total literacy rate of Palam Taluka is 61.74% which is lower than Maharashtra. Genderwise 70.68% males are literate and 52.13% females are literate.

== Religion ==
Religions in Palam taluka
Hindu	84.83%
Muslim	9.24%
Buddhist	5.53%
Unspecified & Other Religions	0.4%

Hindu, Muslim, Buddhist are the major religions in the Taluka.

It also has minor population of Christian, Jain, Sikh, other religions and unspecified religions.
