= Porwad, Parbhani =

Village in Maharashtra

Porwad
- Village
- Location in Maharashtra, India Porwad (India)
- Coordinates: 19°04′59″N 76°43′15″E
- Country: India
- State: Maharashtra
- District: Parbhani

Government
  - Type: Gram panchayat

Population (2011)
  - Total: 1,747
- Demonym: Porwadkar

Languages
  - Official: Marathi
- Time zone: UTC+5:30 (IST)
- PIN: 431521
- Telephone code: 02452
- Vehicle registration: MH-22

Porwad is a village in Parbhani taluka of Parbhani district in Indian state of Maharashtra. It is located from 22 km away from district headquarter Parbhani on Parbhani-Gangakhed state highway 217.

As per 2011 census, Porwad had population of 1,747 residing in 321 houses. Average Sex Ratio of Porwad was 981 with literacy of 77.07%. Male literacy was 87.6% while female literacy was 66.22%. Schedule Caste (SC) constitutes 6.47% of total population.
