= Peth Pimpalgaon, Palam =

Village in Palam taluka of Parbhani district, Maharashtra, India

Peth Pimpalgaon पेठ पिंपळगाव
- Village
- Location in Maharashtra, India Peth Pimpalgaon (India)
- Coordinates: 18.977801°N 76.964051°E
- Country: India
- State: Maharashtra
- District: Parbhani
- Taluka: Palam

Government
  - Type: Gram panchayat

Population (2011)
  - Total: 3,158

Languages
  - Official: Marathi

Literacy
  - Total: 72.46%
  - Male: 82.58%
  - Female: 61.78%
- Time zone: UTC+5:30 (IST)
- PIN: 431720
- Vehicle registration: MH-22
- Website: parbhani.gov.in

Peth Pimpalgaon is a small village in Palam taluka of Parbhani district, Maharashtra, India.

Farming is the main work here, and crops like cotton, soybean, tur, and wheat are commonly grown.

People speak Marathi and celebrate festivals like Diwali, Holi, and Ganesh Chaturthi together.
