= Hasta =

Hasta may refer to:

== Latin ==
- Hasta (spear)
- Hasta Pompeia, a Roman town today known as Asti

== Sanskrit ==
- Hasta (hand), a Sanskrit word meaning hand gesture or position
- Hasta (unit), a measure of length
- Hasta (nakshatra), the thirteenth nakshatra of Hindu astrology

== Fictional character ==
- Hasta Ekstermi

== HASTA ==
- Heart of America Suzuki Teachers Association, a Kansas City area chapter affiliate of the Suzuki Association of the Americas

== See also ==
- Asta (disambiguation)
- Hatra
- Hosta
