= National Heart Foundation of Australia =

Australian charity

- Founded: 1959
- Registration no.: ABN 98 008 419 761
- Region served: Commonwealth of Australia
- Key people: Chief Executive Officer; David Lloyd
- Revenue: A$49,500,000 (2021)
- Website: heartfoundation.org.au

The National Heart Foundation of Australia (known as the Heart Foundation) is a charity established in 1959. Its activities have been funding cardiovascular research, supporting health professionals in their practice, developing health promotion activities, informing and educating the public and assisting people with cardiovascular disease. It describes its mission as "to reduce heart disease and improve the heart health and quality of life of all Australians through our work in Risk Reduction, Support, Care and Research."

== History ==
The organisation emerged after tuberculosis had been effectively removed as a health concern and after the successful establishment of the Heart and Stroke Foundation of Canada. A group of concerned Sydney professionals meet with the trustees of R.T Hall Trust and members of the New South Wales government health services in July 1958 and decided to form the National Heart Foundation of Australia.

== Programs ==
=== Supporting and informing ===
The foundation provides people with, and at risk of, cardiovascular disease information and guidance on how to minimise their risk. Annually, the organisation distributes more than 1.3 million heart health brochures. Each year, the Heart Foundation's information service and its website provides heart health information to thousands of Australians.

=== Partnerships ===
The foundation supports and works with all levels of government, other health organisations, the media and community groups and food manufacturers to implement policies and programmes that attempt to improve the cardiovascular health of Australians. This includes programmes on cardiovascular health risks such as smoking or physical inactivity, through to recovery and rehabilitation and diet. The foundation has partnered with the Health Star Rating System by assisting in monitoring the uptake and compliance of the Health Star Rating on applicable products. The foundation's collected data has been used in the formal reviews of the Health Star Rating and provided help in making the system more effective and accurate. In 2025, they partnered with Heart of the Nation, an initiative founded by Greg Page of The Wiggles.

=== Improving care ===
The foundation claims to take the latest research and creates practical treatment tools for health practitioners. The foundation attempts to bridge gaps in care through programs specifically targeting those Australians at higher risk of cardiovascular disease.

=== Building healthy communities ===
The foundation supports local governments that change neighbourhoods to create healthier communities. Initiatives by councils, such as building cycleways and upgrading walking paths are eligible for Heart Foundation Local Government Awards (to be renamed Heart Foundation Healthy Community Awards in 2011).

=== Promoting awareness ===
Through community education campaigns and media activities, the foundation promotes lifestyle changes to improve the heart health of Australians. Recent examples include the Warning Signs campaign, which raises awareness of the symptoms of a heart attack and of the need to phone 000 so that sufferers can get early treatment to have the best chance for survival.

== Dietary advice ==
The foundation's "Healthy Eating Principles" include plenty of fruit, vegetables and whole grains with a variety of protein sources such as fish and seafood, lean poultry with a restriction on red meat.

The foundation recommends a diet low in saturated fat and trans fat whilst rich in monounsaturated and polyunsaturated fats such as avocados, unsalted nuts, seeds and oily fish like salmon and sardines. The foundation have noted that milk, yoghurt and cheese can be eaten as part of a heart-healthy diet but butter, cream and ice cream are not recommended as heart-healthy.

A 2017 review by the Sax Institute for the National Heart Foundation of Australia on dietary patterns and cardiovascular disease outcomes found that the DASH diet is the most beneficial dietary pattern to reduce CVD risk in healthy populations. Another review published the same year that examined the evidence for the association between dietary fat and cardiovascular disease found that saturated fat consumption is associated with higher mortality and that replacement of saturated fat with polyunsaturated fat decreases risk of cardiovascular disease events and mortality.

In 2018 the Sax Institute for the National Heart Foundation of Australia reviewed evidence on the heart health effects of eating unprocessed red meat and poultry. The report concluded that "the totality of evidence reviewed in this report suggests that white meat (poultry, turkey and rabbit) have relatively neutral, whereas unprocessed red meat (beef, pork, veal, and lamb) likely have moderately adverse outcomes on cardiovascular effects, particularly related to weight gain and stroke risk."

In 2019, the foundation lifted their limit on full fat dairy products and eggs for the general population. The recommended limit remains for those with heart disease, high cholesterol or type 2 diabetes. The foundation published a position statement on full fat dairy products, "Based on current evidence, there is not enough evidence to recommend full fat over reduced fat products or reduced fat over full fat products for the general population. For people with elevated cholesterol and those with existing coronary heart disease, reduced fat products are recommended." The position statement also noted that the "evidence for milk, yoghurt and cheese does not extend to butter, cream, ice-cream and dairy-based desserts; these products should be avoided in a heart healthy eating pattern".

The foundation's 2019 position statement on dietary fat and heart healthy eating recommends replacing saturated fat with polyunsaturated fat, monounsaturated fat and whole grains to lower risk of a cardiovascular disease. The foundation's 2021 position statement on alcohol and heart health for the general population is to reduce consumption to no more than 10 standard drinks per week and no more than 4 standard drinks on any one day which supports the National Health and Medical Research Council's recommendation levels. The foundation has stated that alcohol consumption is harmful to people with atrial fibrillation so such individuals may need to drink less or none at all.

== Selected publications ==
- Jennings GL, Audehm R, Bishop W, Chow CK, Liaw ST, Liew D, Linton SM. (2021). "National Heart Foundation of Australia: position statement on coronary artery calcium scoring for the primary prevention of cardiovascular disease in Australia". The Medical Journal of Australia. 214 (9): 434–439. doi:10.5694/mja2.51039. PMC 8252756. PMID 33960402.
- Porter, J; Just, J; Buttery A; Jennings, G; Meertens, B. (2021). "Position Statement on Alcohol From the National Heart Foundation of Australia". Heart, Lung and Circulation. 30 (3): S281–S282. doi:10.1016/j.hlc.2021.06.416. S2CID 238876367.

== See also ==
- Healthcare in Australia
- Health Star Rating System
- National Heart Foundation of New Zealand
- List of Charity Organization
