= Aste, Estonia =

Borough in Estonia

Aste
- Borough
- Location within Estonia
- Coordinates: 58°20′37″N 22°27′32″E
- Country: Estonia
- County: Saare County

Population (1 January 2020)
  - Total: 389
- Time zone: UTC+2 (EET)

Aste is a small borough (Estonian: alevik) in Saaremaa Parish, Saare County in western Estonia. It was the site of the Soviet military Aste Airfield.
