= Ashti =

Ashti may refer to:

== Places ==
- Ashti, Solapur, Maharashtra, India
- Ashti, Beed, Maharashtra, India
- Ashti, Gadchiroli, Maharashtra, India
- Ashti, Jalna, Maharashtra, India
- Ashti, Khed, Maharashtra, India
- Ashti, Wardha, Maharashtra, India
- Ashti (Vidhan Sabha constituency)

== Other uses ==
- ashti, meaning "peace" in Persian, the reconciliation phase of Qahr and Ashti

== See also ==
- Ashta (disambiguation)
