= Muji tsetin =

Traditional Kashmiri condiment made with radish and yogurt

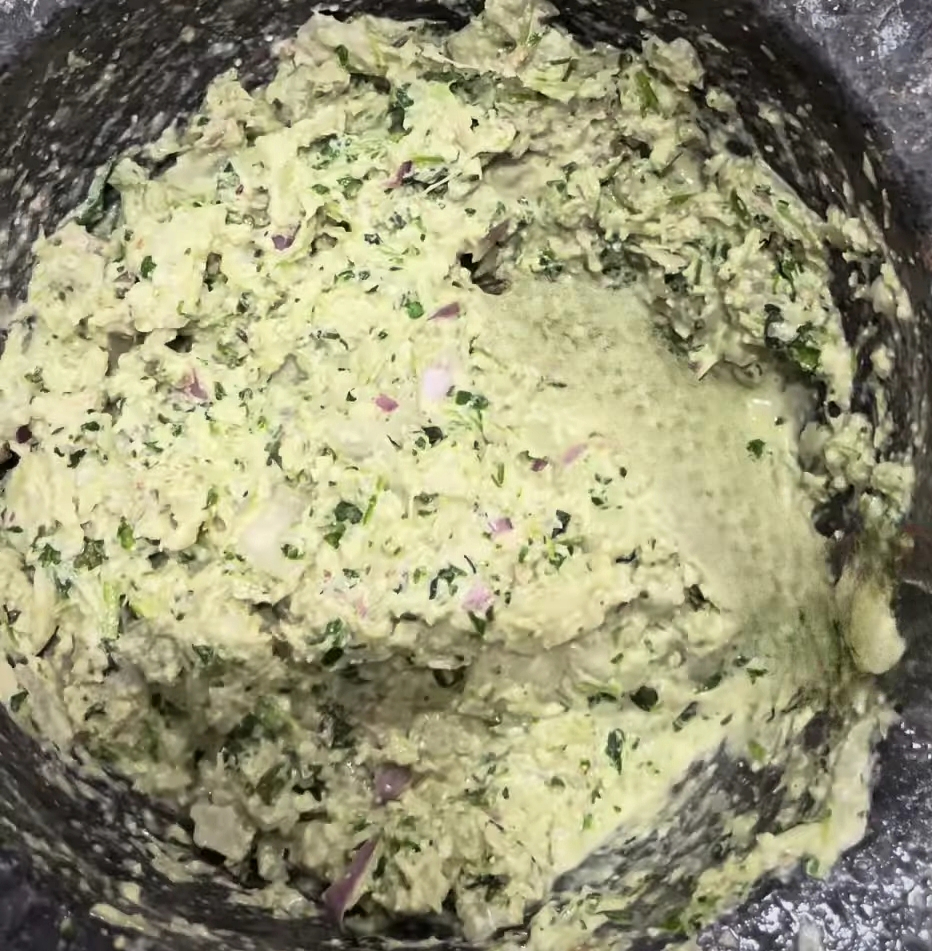
- Type: Condiment
- Place of origin: Kashmir
- Region or state: Kashmir
- Serving temperature: Cold or room temperature
- Main ingredients: Radish, yogurt, spices

Muji tsetin (Kashmiri pronunciation: [mud͡ʒi t͡seʈinʲ]), is a traditional Kashmiri condiment made primarily with radish and yogurt. It is often served as a side dish or condiment and is known for its refreshing flavor. The dish is a staple in Kashmiri cuisine and is commonly enjoyed with rice. It is also served as part of the Kashmiri Wazwan.
