= Marika Geldmacher-von Mallinckrodt =

German chemist and university teacher

Marika Geldmacher-von Mallinckrodt, nee von Mallinckrodt-Haupt (born 28 April 1923 in Potsdam; died 23 December 2016 in Erlangen) was a German chemist, physician and professor at the University of Erlangen. Her main focus in research was on forensic toxicology, forensic and clinical-toxicological analytics and ecogenetics.

== Life ==
After graduating from high school in Bamberg at the age of 16, Geldmacher von Mallinckrodt studied chemistry at the universities of Cologne, Munich and Erlangen from 1940 to 1948. In 1948, she was awarded a doctorate in natural sciences. The title of her dissertation was: "Ueber den Umsatz zwischen Schwefelstickstoff und Zinnchlorür, Zur Kenntnis des Tetraschwefeldinitrids S_{4}N_{2}". From 1949 to 1954, she studied medicine at the University of Erlangen and obtained her doctorate in medicine in July 1954. The title of her dissertation was "Die Elektrophorese der Kohlenhydrate". From 1954 to 1963, she was a scientific assistant at the University of Erlangen-Nuremberg, where she worked at the Institute for Forensic Medicine and Criminalistics. In 1960, she was recognized as a "Clinical Chemist" by the "Gesellschaft für Klinische Chemie". In 1964 she was awarded the venia legendi for the subject "Forensic Chemistry". She was awarded a professorship in 1970 and a C3 professorship in 1978. Marika Geldmacher-von Mallinckrodt had been retired since 1985.

On 6 December 1943 she married the Regierungsbaumeister Dr. Ing. Herbert Geldmacher. This marriage produced five children who were born in 1944, 1945, 1954, 1957 and 1966. Marika Geldmacher von Mallinckrodt had nine grandchildren.

She was the daughter of dermatologist Asta von Mallinckrodt-Haupt and had 4 siblings. She was friends with Hildegard Hamm-Brücher.

== Research ==
A part of her research focused on toxicology. Due to her knowledge in medicine and chemistry, she helped treat intoxicated people. Furthermore, she built the basis for personalized medicine by investigating ethnic characteristics of the metabolism and their percentage distribution in the respective population. To do so, she asked her doctoral students for blood samples from all over the world. For example, she investiaged the differences in sensitivity to insecticides (e.g., E 605).

== Selected publications ==
Marika Geldmacher von Mallinckrodt wrote more than 130 scientific articles in books and journals. In 1976 she published her book "Einfache Untersuchungen auf Gifte im klinisch-chemischen Laboratorium" (Simple tests for toxins in clinical chemistry laboratories). In 1989 she published together with Hans J. Gibitz "Klinisch-toxikologische Analytik bei akuten Vergiftungen und Drogenmissbrauch". She was co-author of the books "Gerichtliche Medizin" (1975), "Metalle in der Umwelt" (1984), "Lehrbuch der Klinischen Chemie und Pathobiochemie" (1987, 1989, 1995), "Metals and their Compounds in the Environment" (1991), "Handbook on Metals in Clinical Chemistry" (1995). She was also editor of the "Mitteilungen der Kommission für klinisch-toxikologische Analytik der Deutschen Forschungsgemeinschaft" from 1982 to 1995.

== Awards ==
In 1980 the city of Erlangen awarded Mallinckrodt's Geldmacher-von Mallinckrodt the Ehrenbrief. In 1986 she was awarded the Jean Servais Stas Medal of the Society for Toxicological and Forensic Chemistry. In 1987 she was awarded the Order of Merit of the Federal Republic of Germany.
