= Asta von Mallinckrodt-Haupt =

German dermatologist (1896–1960)

Asta von Mallinckrodt-Haupt, also Malinkrodt, (born as Auguste Stephanie von Haupt 27 November 1896 in Bamberg; died 23 June 1960 in Cologne) was a German dermatologist. She was the first female professor of dermatology in Germany.

== Life ==
Von Mallinckrodt-Haupt, daughter of Stephan von Haupt, Councillor of the District Court, studied medicine in Berlin from 1915, passing her state examination in 1921, followed by specialist training in dermatology at the Charité under Franz Blumenthal. In 1922, she received her doctorate for her dissertation "Beitrag zur Frage der Immimmitätserscheinungen bei Hyphomycetenerkrankungen" (Contribution to the Question of Immunity Symptoms in Hyphomycetes Diseases) (grade very good) with Blumenthal in Berlin. Together with Blumenthal, she wrote the chapter on the serodiagnosis of syphilis in Josef Jadassohn's Handbuch der Haut- und Geschlechtskrankheiten in 1929. In 1922, she married the head forester Johann Dietrich von Mallinckrodt in Bamberg, with whom she had two daughters and three sons. She remained at the skin clinic of the Charité until 1924 and then moved from Potsdam (where she had lived since 1922) to Daun in the Eifel because of the profession of her husband. She completed a traineeship with Erich Hoffmann in Bonn from 1928 to 1930 and was assistant to Theo Schreuss at the Dermatological Clinic of the Medical Academy in Düsseldorf in 1930, where she habilitated in 1932 (Der Stoffwechsel der pathogenen Hautpilze und sein Zusammenhang mit der Pathogenese der Mykosen. Mit experimentellen Beiträgen). She also became a lecturer at the Medical Academy. From 1931, she was also a resident physician in Brühl. In 1939, she habilitated again in Cologne and became a private lecturer there. In 1941, she became an unscheduled professor in Cologne and thus the first female professor of dermatology in Germany. In addition, she was a Gausachbearbeiterin in Cologne/Aachen and engaged in the fight against alcohol and tobacco. In 1938, she published on the fight against prostitution. In 1950/51, she founded a private clinic for skin diseases in Brühl and managed it until 1959, when she suffered a heart attack.

She is the mother of the toxicologist Marika Geldmacher-von Mallinckrodt.

== Research ==
Von Mallinckrodt-Haupt was mainly concerned with fungal diseases of the skin. Medical mycology was her preferred field of interest and research; she also did research on porphyrin.

== Selected publications ==
This is a selection of von Mallinckrodt-Haupt's work:

- Beitrag zur Frage der Immunitätserscheinungen bei Hyphomycetenerkrankungen. Berlin, Diss. Med. v. 1922
- With Franz Blumenthal: Immunisatorische Vorgänge bei der Trichophytie des Menschen. (Dtsch. med. Wschr. 1920, Nr. 2, S. 37-39)
- Blumenthal, Franz; Mallinckrodt-Haupt, Asta (1923-09-01). "Zur Biologie der Hautpilze: I. Mitteilung". Archiv für Dermatologie und Syphilis (in German). 144 (3): 458–475. doi:10.1007/BF01824964. ISSN 0340-3696. S2CID 33869679.
- Mallinckrodt-Haupt, Asta (1928-10-01). "Die Protease der pathogenen Hautpilze". Archiv für Dermatologie und Syphilis (in German). 154 (3): 493–508. doi:10.1007/BF01828313. ISSN 0340-3696. S2CID 8559932.
- Der Stoffwechsel der pathogenen Hautpilze und sein Zusammenhang mit der Pathogenese der Mykosen. Mit experimentellen Beiträgen." Düsseldorf, Med. Akad., Habil. Schr. 1932
- Mallinckrodt-Haupt, Asta St. (1933-02-01). "Der Stoffwechsel der pathogenen Hautpilze und sein Zusammenhang mit der Pathogenese der Mykosen: Mit experimentellen BeitrÄgen". Zeitschrift für Parasitenkunde (in German). 5 (2): 217–369. doi:10.1007/BF02121879. ISSN 0932-0113. S2CID 30764424.
- Der Infektionsschutz der Haut. (Klin. Wschr. 1932 II, 1739–1742)
- Varicellen und Sensibilisierung durch Licht. Dermat. Wschr. 1934 II, 917-922 (zit. nach Zentralbl. f. d. ges. Kinderhk. 29(1934), 619)
- Mallinckrodt-Haupt, A.St.; Carrié, C. (1934-02-01). "Die Pilzfluorescenz in vitro". Archiv für Dermatologie und Syphilis (in German). 169 (4): 519–526. doi:10.1007/BF02062656. ISSN 0340-3696. S2CID 33746243.
- Carrié, C.; Mallinckrodt-Haupt, A. St.; Schreus, H. Th. (1934-11-01). "Die Porphyrinbildung durch pathogene Hautpilze". Archiv für Dermatologie und Syphilis (in German). 170 (5): 521–529. doi:10.1007/BF02058876. ISSN 0340-3696. S2CID 39469104.
- Die Bildung lichtsensibilisierender Substanzen durch Mikroorganismen. (Strahlenther., 61 (1938), 636, zit. nach: Münch. med. Wschr. 85(1938), 1211)
- Die Prostitution und ihre Bekämpfung. (Ärztin 14(1938), 248-250)
- Die Haut als Spiegel der Gesundheit und als Schutzorgan für den Gesamtorganismus. (Ärztin 15(1939), 148-150)
- Kampf den Volksgiften. (Ärztin 17(1941), S. 118 -123)
- Die sog. Schmutzkrankheiten und ihre Bekämpfung. (Ärztin 18(1942), 214-220
- Work on the Handbuch d. Haut- und Geschlechtskrankheiten, 1929
- Mallinckrodt-Haupt, A. St.; Geldmacher-Mallinckrodt, M. (1956-09-01). "Die Isolierung der Antibiotica aus pathogenen Hautpilzen". Mycopathologia et Mycologia Applicata (in German). 7 (3–4): 261–268. doi:10.1007/BF02249077. ISSN 0301-486X. PMID 13387628. S2CID 29754328.
