= Asda Story =

2008 video game

- Developer: MaxOn Soft Corp
- Publishers: mGame (Korea); Play Media Group (Europe); GamesCampus (U.S.); OnGame (Brazil); nDoors (Japan); GamePower7 (Middle East)
- Platform: Windows
- Release: NA: July 15, 2008; -July 21, 2008 (Closed Beta), NA: August 5, 2008; (Open Server)
- Genre: Fantasy MMORPG
- Mode: Multiplayer

Asda Story was a massively multiplayer online role-playing game developed by the MaxOn Soft corporation. It was published by GamesCampus for the North American market, Play Media Group for the market in Europe, OnGame for the Brazilian market, nDoors for the market in Japan, GamePower7 for the MENA market (under the title World of Secrets (Arabic: عالم الأسرار)) and mGame for the market in Korea.

The Open Server for Asda Story launched on August 5, 2008. The game was originally called "MicMac Online" in Japan and Korea. The Japanese MicMac service was closed on September 30, 2008, after running for two years. The service in North America from GamesCampus also came to a close on August 1, 2011. The game was succeeded by its sequel Asda 2 Evolution which shut down on July 15, 2015.

== Gameplay ==
The game has a Soul Mate system where two players can become Soul Mates. If one Soul Mate is offline, the player can help to level up his Soul Mate's character. Experience will be stored for the Soul Mate that is offline. Soul Mates also have access to special skills available only to them.

Characters can also dig for items, similar to mining in many other MMO games. Digging may be carried out anywhere except in towns. All that is required to dig is a shovel, which all characters are provided from the start. The nature and quality of items obtained by digging varies according to the level of the character.

Characters may also obtain titles, which can be displayed above their names. Titles are obtained by participating in or carrying out a diverse variety of actions in the game: from simply picking up everything they find, to helping NPCs by completing quests, to joining clans. Achieving a title only awarded the player the ability to display it, but there were plans for certain titles to award other more tangible benefits, such as providing stat bonuses.

Characters start at level 1 with the generic job of "beginner", which has no skills available to it. At level 5, players may choose a class of Warrior, Archer, or Mage by undertaking a quest from the appropriate NPC. Additionally, each class has a second and third job tier which they can advance to. All these class changes are available at levels 5, 24, and 40. Experience gain is not stopped during those levels, so it is possible to continue leveling up without taking the job change quest.

The Faction War System is a unique system where players above second job change can choose between 3 factions and battle against one another to gain honour points and coins, which in turn can be used to buy special items from the war shop. The Faction War System is split into three different stages, one for levels 24–39, another one for levels 40-59 and the last one for levels 60 and above. This is so to make it more balanced and provide lower and mid-level players with a more entertaining war environment.

Character stats are incremented automatically in this game instead of being allocated by the player. To complement a character's natural stats, he can obtain socketable items called Sowels which, when inserted into items, augment player stats.

Each of the three first tier jobs of Warrior, Archer, and Mage has three skill trees each. Progress along a skill tree is generally dependent on having points in skills lower in the tree, limiting cross-tree skill selection. Generally, a character of a chosen class will usually concentrate on one skill tree and spend only a few points in the other skill trees available to that class.

== Development and release ==
Asda Story is based on Mikku Mikku Online, a commercially failed MMORPG in 2007. The game was launched in 2008.

== Reception ==
MMOHuts.com rated Asda Story as "Good" (3/5) praising the game's unique "Soul Mate" system but criticizing the game's Recycled monster animations and few playable classes.

The name got confused reactions in the United Kingdom, as there is a large supermarket chain also called Asda.

== Legacy ==
The developer announced a revamped version of the game titled Asda R. A beta test took place in 2011.
