= 1041 Asta =

Carbonaceous background asteroid

Discovery
- Discovered by: K. Reinmuth
- Discovery site: Heidelberg Obs.
- Discovery date: 22 March 1925

Designations
- Named after: Asta Nielsen (Danish actress)
- Alternative designations: 1925 FA · 1938 SJ_{1} 1949 UQ · 1949 UX; 1951 CQ_{1} · 1956 AT; A906 VA · A917 YB
- Minor planet category: main-belt · (outer) background

Orbital characteristics
- Epoch 4 September 2017 (JD 2458000.5)
- Uncertainty parameter 0
- Observation arc: 110.65 yr (40,416 days)
- Aphelion: 3.5142 AU
- Perihelion: 2.6335 AU
- Semi-major axis: 3.0738 AU
- Eccentricity: 0.1433
- Orbital period (sidereal): 5.39 yr (1,968 days)
- Mean anomaly: 203.59°
- Mean motion: 0° 10^{m} 58.44^{s} / day
- Inclination: 13.934°
- Longitude of ascending node: 60.001°
- Argument of perihelion: 343.95°

Physical characteristics
- Dimensions: 43.46±10.89 km 44.05±11.20 km 49.43±0.78 km 57.16 km (derived); 58.88±0.87 km 60.571±0.199 km 61.852±1.162 km
- Synodic rotation period: 7.554±0.001 h 7.99±0.02 h
- Geometric albedo: 0.0421±0.0028; 0.047±0.002; 0.047±0.006; 0.0493 (derived); 0.066±0.010; 0.07±0.04; 0.08±0.06
- Spectral type: SMASS = C · C
- Absolute magnitude (H): 10.08±0.31 · 10.10 · 10.17

1041 Asta, provisional designation 1925 FA, is a carbonaceous background asteroid from the outer regions of the asteroid belt, approximately 57 kilometers in diameter. It was discovered on 22 March 1925, by German astronomer Karl Reinmuth at the Heidelberg Observatory in southwest Germany. The asteroid was likely named after Danish actress Asta Nielsen.

== Orbit and classification ==
Asta is a non-family asteroid from the main belt's background population. It orbits the Sun in the outer main-belt at a distance of 2.6–3.5 AU once every 5 years and 5 months (1,968 days; semi-major axis of 3.07 AU). Its orbit has an eccentricity of 0.14 and an inclination of 14° with respect to the ecliptic. The asteroid was first observed as A906 VA at Heidelberg in November 1906, where the body's observation arc begins one month later in December 1906.

== Physical characteristics ==
In the SMASS classification, Asta is a carbonaceous C-type asteroid. Pan-STARRS photometric survey also characterizes the asteroid as a C-type.

=== Rotation period ===
Photometric observations of Asta collected at the Australian Oakley Southern Sky Observatory and the U.S. Oakley Observatory in October 2008 show a rotation period of 7.99 hours with a brightness variation of 0.22 magnitude (U=2+). In February 2010, a refined lightcurve with a period of 7.554 hours and an amplitude of 0.14 magnitude was obtained by French amateur astronomer Pierre Antonini, who also mentioned the possibility of an alternative period solution (U=3-).

=== Diameter and albedo ===
According to the surveys carried out by the Japanese Akari satellite and the NEOWISE mission of NASA's Wide-field Infrared Survey Explorer, Asta measures between 43.46 and 61.852 kilometers in diameter and its surface has an albedo between 0.0421 and 0.08.

The Collaborative Asteroid Lightcurve Link derives an albedo of 0.0493 and a diameter of 57.16 kilometers based on an absolute magnitude of 10.1.

== Naming ==
This minor planet was likely named after Danish actress Asta Nielsen (1881–1972), according to research by the author of the Dictionary of Minor Planet Names, Lutz Schmadel (LDS). The naming was proposed by ARI-astronomer Gustav Stracke.
