= American Dental Society of Anesthesiology =

- Formation: 1953
- Type: Professional association
- Headquarters: Chicago, Illinois
- Location: United States
- Members: 4,500
- Official language: English
- Website: adsahome.org

The American Dental Society of Anesthesiology (ADSA) is an American professional association established in 1953 and based in Chicago.

== Mission ==
The mission of the American Dental Society of Anesthesiology is to provide a forum for education, research, and recognition of achievement in order to promote safe and effective patient care for all dentists who have an interest in anesthesiology, sedation and the control of anxiety and pain.

== Publications ==
The ADSA publishes a quarterly scientific journal of dental sedation and anesthesia-related articles named Anesthesia Progress: A Journal for Pain and Anxiety Control in Dentistry. Anesthesia Progress is the official journal of the American Dental Society of Anesthesiology and has been published quarterly since 1954. This peer-reviewed journal also serves as the official umbrella journal for: the American Society of Dentist Anesthesiologists, the Australian Society of Dental Anesthesiology, the Canadian Society of Dental Anesthesia, the European Federation for the Advancement of Anesthesia in Dentistry and the International Federation of Dental Anesthesiology Societies. Anesthesia Progress is indexed in Excerpta Medica (EMBASE), MEDLINE, and Periodicals Digest in Dentistry.

Retrospective articles were prepared for Anesthesia Progress on the 25th and 35th anniversaries of the society.

ADSA also publishes the bi-monthly newsletter Pulse.

== Members ==
ADSA Membership is open to all dental professionals who have an interest in sedation and anesthesia. From its inception, Oral and Maxillofacial Surgeons and Dentist Anesthesiologists were encouraged to attain Fellowship status to recognize their high level of training. Since 2001, Diplomates of the National Dental Board of Anesthesiology and the American Board of Anesthesiology have been allowed to obtain ADSA Fellowship without a second examination process. The American Dental Society of Anesthesiology established the College of Sedation in Dentistry in 2001 for General Dentists to attain either Member (Enteral) or Master (Parenteral) status in the College.

== History ==
Since its creation in 1953, the focus of the American Dental Society of Anaesthesiology has been to provide continuing education, recognize educational achievement and pursue research. Its active membership of over 4,500 dentists includes general dentists as well as members from all of the dental specialities with interest in sedation, anaesthesia and pain control.

== Contributions to the profession of dentistry ==
=== First workshop on Teaching Pain Control to Dental Students (1963) ===
In 1963 on its tenth anniversary, the American Dental Society of Anesthesiology held a workshop on Teaching Pain Control to Dental Students. An objective of that meeting was to determine how to encourage dental schools to coordinate the parts of the curriculum that are concerned, directly or indirectly with pain control. The workshop papers were published in the Journal of Dental Education 1964.

=== Second Pain Control Conference (1965) ===
The Second Pain Control Conference was held in 1965 by the American Dental Society of Anesthesiology to further develop the predoctoral program in pain control. One of the purposes was to protect the inherent right and accept the corresponding responsibility to advance the field in the profession of dentistry. The report of this conference was sent to all dental schools and communities of interest.

=== Third Pain Control Conference (1970) ===
The purpose of this conference was to develop guidelines for pain control in dentistry. Representatives of 48 dental schools, all dental specialty societies, the various federal services, and the sponsoring organizations attended. A document providing a guide for the teaching of pain control at all levels (undergraduate, advanced [postgraduate and graduate]), and continuing education was developed. The approval of the sponsoring agencies created a comprehensive statement, official in nature, that reflected the posture of the entire dental profession. Ultimately, the guidelines were accepted by the ADA Council on Dental Education and the House of Delegates of the ADA.

=== Teaching of Pain Control in Continuing Education Programs (1977) ===
This conference resulted in the creation of the complete sequence of guidelines as they relate to pain control at all educational levels within the profession.

=== Workshop on Anesthesia Education (1989) ===
This workshop focused on an increased emphasis on quality assurance and risk management applicable to dentistry in general and the modalities of anxiety and pain control employed by dentists in particular. The sponsors of the workshop were also concerned about the decreasing number of opportunities available to dentists for advanced training beyond that provided in traditional dental education.

=== 1991 ===
Creation of specific, detailed monitoring standards with universal applicability in the dental setting Guidelines for Intraoperative Monitoring of Dental Patients Undergoing Conscious Sedation, Deep Sedation, and General Anesthesia

The promulgation and adoption of intraoperative monitoring standards in medicine for anesthesia has resulted in early detection of untoward events during sedation and anesthesia, lowering of malpractice premiums, and an improvement in the quality of care. The American Dental Society of Anesthesiology has devised specific, detailed monitoring standards with universal applicability in the dental setting.

=== Workshop on Enteral Sedation in Dentistry (2003) ===
The American Dental Society of Anesthesiology and the Anesthesia Research Foundation helped organize the Workshop on Enteral Sedation in Dentistry that was held in Washington, D.C., on December 2–3, 2003. Co-sponsored by the United States Pharmacopeial Convention, Inc. (USP) and the Dental Anesthesia Research Group of the International Association for Dental Research, this conference brought together medical and dental communities of interest along with basic science and clinical experts to review the scientific basic and clinical practice and evidenced-based foundations of enteral sedation in dentistry.

=== American Dental Association Council on Dental Education and Licensure's Committee on Anesthesiology (2003) ===
Representatives of the American Dental Society of Anesthesiology often grapple with issues pertaining to sedation and anesthesia by dentists in this forum.

=== 2006 ===
With representatives of the American Dental Association, American Academy of General Dentistry, American Association of Oral and Maxillofacial Surgeons, American Academy of Pediatric Dentistry, and the American Society of Dentist Anesthesiologists, the American Dental Society of Anesthesiology funded and organized a roundtable discussion of sedation/anesthesia issues facing dentistry and how to address them.

=== Town Hall Forum on Anesthesia and Dentistry ===
The ADSA Town Hall Anesthesia Forum was conceived by the ADSA to address the needs and concerns of the dental community regarding the ADA Guidelines approved in 2007. Mark Feldman, President of the American Dental Association, will present the Keynote Address. Representatives from the American Academy of Pediatric Dentists, Federal Services, Academy of General Dentistry, Canadian Academy of Dental Anaesthesia, American Association of Oral and Maxillofacial Surgeons, American Society of Dentist Anesthesiologists, Dental Organization of Conscious Sedation and the American Dental Society of Anesthesiology are scheduled to attend and address the group.

=== 2008–2009 ===
American Dental Society of Anesthesiology won a $100,000 ADA Foundation grant to fund advanced training to manage rare dental emergencies. A number of pilot and proof-of-concept courses were held during 2008 and 2009, including a pilot testing program Dec. 8 in Chicago, which enabled ADA representatives and staff to observe. After the course was developed and the grant finished, the ADA began a series of courses.

=== 2010–2015 ===
In 2006 in Yokohama, Japan, the American Dental Society of Anesthesiology made a successful bid to hold the International Federation of Dental Anesthesia Societies' 13th Annual International Dental Congress on Modern Pain Control in Hawaii in 2012. Peter Tan led the ADSA during the post-recession years, as ADSA experienced an unprecedented level of expansion and growth, culminating in a strategic overhaul in 2014.
