= Asta schaffneri =

Scientific classification
- Kingdom: Plantae
- Clade: Tracheophytes
- Clade: Angiosperms
- Clade: Eudicots
- Clade: Rosids
- Order: Brassicales
- Family: Brassicaceae
- Tribe: Asteae
- Genus: Asta; Klotzsch ex O.E.Schulz
- Species: A. schaffneri

Binomial name
- Asta schaffneri (S.Watson) O.E.Schulz

Subspecies
- Asta schaffneri subsp. pringlei (O.E.Schulz) Al-Shehbaz; Asta schaffneri subsp. schaffneri; Asta schaffneri subsp. stricta (Rollins) Al-Shehbaz

Synonyms
- Capsella schaffneri S.Watson

Genus of flowering plants

Asta schaffneri is a species of flowering plant in the family Brassicaceae, and the sole species in genus Asta. It is a subshrub native to northeastern Mexico.

Three subspecies are accepted.

- Asta schaffneri subsp. pringlei (O.E.Schulz) Al-Shehbaz (synonyms Asta pringlei O.E.Schulz and Asta schaffneri var. pringlei (O.E.Schulz) Rollins)
- Asta schaffneri subsp. schaffneri – San Luis Potosí
- Asta schaffneri subsp. stricta (Rollins) Al-Shehbaz (synonym Asta stricta Rollins) – Querétaro and Hidalgo
