= Aste Airfield =

Former military airfield in Estonia

- IATA: none; ICAO: none

Summary
- Airport type: ~~Military~~
- Operator: ~~Soviet Air Force~~
- Location: Kuressaare
- Elevation AMSL: 69 ft (21 m)
- Coordinates: 58°21′38″N 022°26′49″E

Map
- Location in Estonia

Runways
| Direction | Length | | Surface |
| Direction | m | ft | Surface |
|---|---|---|---|
| ~~17/35~~ | ~~2,000~~ | ~~6,562~~ | ~~Grass~~ |

Asta (Estonian: Aste) was a Soviet air base in Estonia located near the town of Aste, 12 km (7.5 mi) north of Kuressaare. It is on Saaremaa Island, and was listed on the 1974 Department of Defense Global Navigation Chart No. 3 as having jet facilities. It was probably a front-line interceptor or dispersal base. In the 1980s or 1990s it was plowed under. Very little of the base remains.

The airfield was originally established in 1939.
