= Ashti, Jalna =

Village in Maharashtra

Ashti Ashti Dhotar Joda
- Village
- Location in Maharashtra, India Ashti (India)
- Coordinates: 19.595488°N 76.211063°E
- Country: India
- State: Maharashtra
- District: Jalna

Government
  - Type: Gram panchayat

Population (2011)
  - Total: 14,020
- Demonym: Ashtikar

Languages
  - Official: Marathi
- Time zone: UTC+5:30 (IST)
- PIN: 431507
- Telephone code: 02484
- ISO 3166 code: IN-MH
- Vehicle registration: MH-21

Ashti (official name: Ashti Dhotar Joda) is a major village in Partur taluka of Jalna district in Maharashtra state of India.

== Demographics ==
- Ashti village has total 2594 families residing with a population of 14,020 of which 7,127 are males and 6,893 are females as per Population Census 2011.
- Average Sex Ratio of Ashti village is 967 which is higher than Maharashtra state average of 929.
- Ashti village has lower literacy rate compared to Maharashtra. In 2011, literacy rate of Ashti village was 67.94% compared to 82.34% of Maharashtra. In Ashti Male literacy stands at 75.23% while female literacy rate was 60.42%.
- Schedule Caste (SC) constitutes 9.08% while Schedule Tribe (ST) were 1.53% of total population in Ashti village.

== Transport ==
Ashti is located 74 km (46 mi) towards South from District headquarters Jalna, 27 km (17 mi) from Partur and 416 km (258 mi) from State capital Mumbai. Ashti is surrounded by Sailu Taluka and Pathri Taluka towards East, Ghansawangi Taluka towards west and Majalgaon Taluka towards South.

There is no railway station at Ashti. Nearest railway stations are, Partur24 km (15 mi), Usmanpur19 km (12 mi), Satona24 km (15 mi)(24 km).

Aurangabad Airport113 km (70 mi) is the nearest airport from the village.

== Administration ==
- Though Ashti is in Jalna district, it comes under Parbhani Loksabha Constituency for Lok Sabha or General Elections of India.
  The current Member of Parliament is Sanjay(Bandu) Jadhav of Shiv Sena party.
- Ashti comes under Partur-Mantha constituency for Legislative Assembly elections of Maharashtra.
  The current Member of Legislative Assembly (MLA) from this area is Babanrao Lonikar of Bhartiya Janata Party, who is former cabinet minister in Government of Maharashtra.
