= American Spice Trade Association =

American trade association

The American Spice Trade Association (ASTA) is an American trade association for companies importing, processing and distributing food spices. It was founded in New York City in 1907 by 55 "founding fathers". It was decided that ASTA membership would be available to spice importers, dealers, agents, manufacturers and brokers, with each firm to have a single vote. Today, the ASTA claims 175 member companies. Technical standards developed by the association are used by some spice-importing countries to regulate the cleanliness and other properties of imported spices. ASTA performs functions of business advocacy, marketing information, technical and safety standards development, and input to governments on laws and regulations.
