= Australian Beverages Council =

The Australian Beverages Council, formerly known as the Australian Soft Drinks Association (ASDA) is an industry group that represents the interests of Australian manufacturers, importers and distributors of non-alcoholic beverages. Their headquarters is in Waterloo, New South Wales, Australia.
