= Kashmiri red chilli =

Variety of chilli pepper

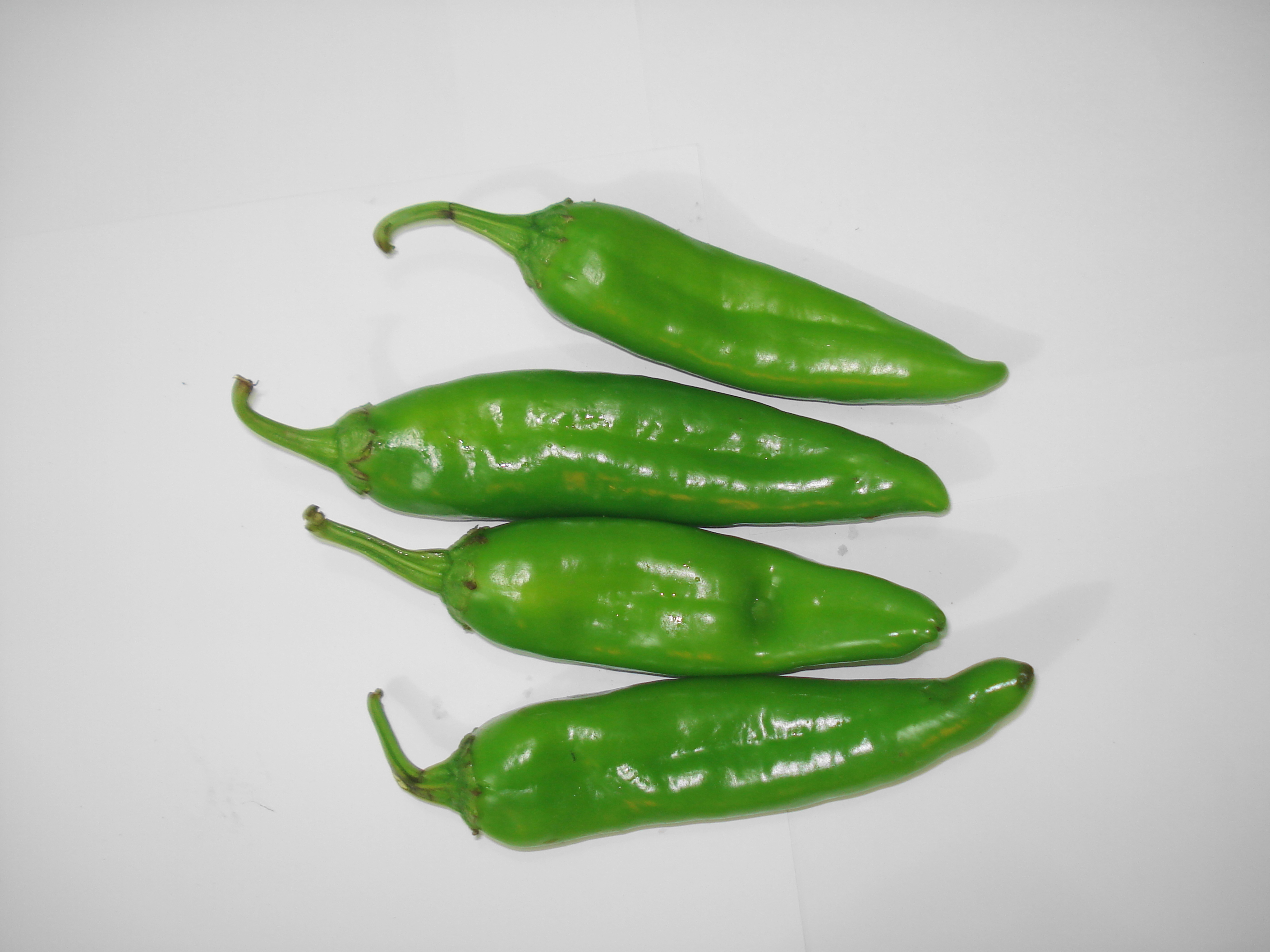
- Species: Capsicum annuum
- Marketing names: Kashmiri mirch, Kashmiri laal mirch
- Heat: Mild
- Scoville scale: 1000 – 2000 SHU

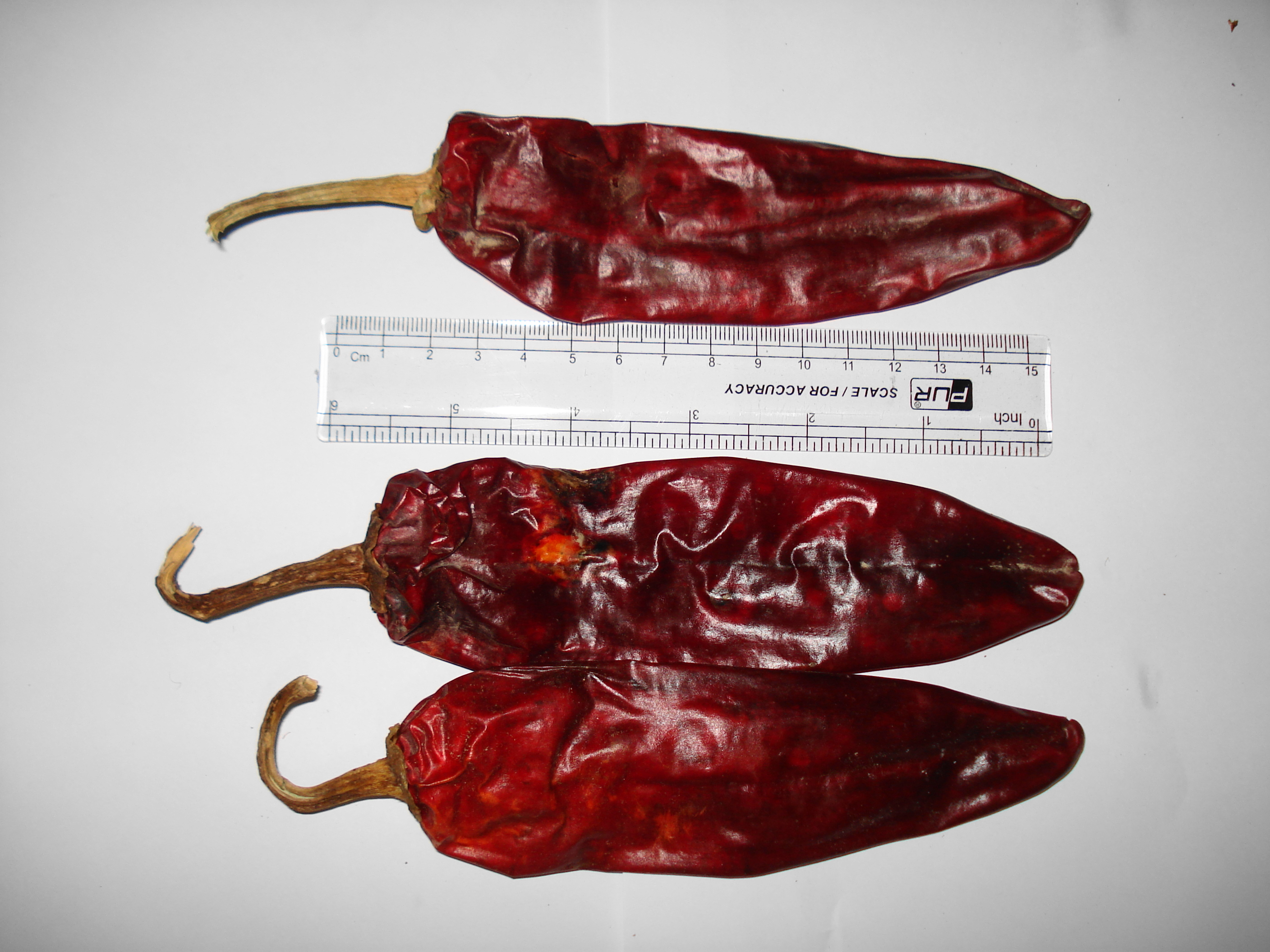
Slightly dried red Kashmiri chilli peppers

Kashmiri red chillies or Kashmiri laal mirch are characterized by their ability to give a dark red colour to food and add flavour, while not allowing the food to become too pungent or spicy.

India is the largest consumer and producer. Numerous companies sell the powdered form, including MDH, Everest Spices, Sakthi Masala and Badshah Masala. Vir Sanghvi writes that a majority of the restaurant industry in India uses Kashmiri chillies or their powdered form. Chefs even use Kashmiri chillies as a substitute for dishes with Goan peri-peri masala.

Due to the high demand for Kashmiri chillis, substitutes such as Byadagi chillies are often used. There are government initiatives and incentives in Jammu and Kashmir to support and increase the production of the local variety of the Kashmiri chilli.

== Characteristics ==
According to the Spices Board of India, under the Ministry of Commerce and Industry, Government of India, Kashmiri chillies are mainly grown in Jammu and Kashmir and Himachal Pradesh, but also in places such as Goa. They are harvested during winter.

=== Colour ===
Kashmiri pepper appears wrinkled and rough, often brownish when traditionally dried (long dry), but contains densely concentrated red pigment material.

The American Spice Trade Association (ASTA) colour value is 54.10. This value helps identify the amount of colour that can be extracted from the chilli. The capsaicin value is 0.325%. They are mild, reading 1000–2000 SHU on the Scoville scale. There are different qualities of Kashmiri red chillies. According to a study in 1999, the capsaicin value was found to be 0.126%.

== Statistics ==
India's Consumer Education and Research Centre puts Everest Kashmiri Lal (Everest Spices) at SHU 48,000, while Golden Harvest Kashmiri Mirch Powder (Golden Harvest) has an SHU of 60,000. This SHU level is similar to other brands in the market. Brick powder is one of the forms of adulteration.

== Usage ==
It is used in various dishes such as tandoori chicken and snacks such as tiger prawns. It is also used in pickles and chutneys. It is used in food like pav bhaji and misal pav for colour.
