= Rogan josh =

Indian curried meat dish

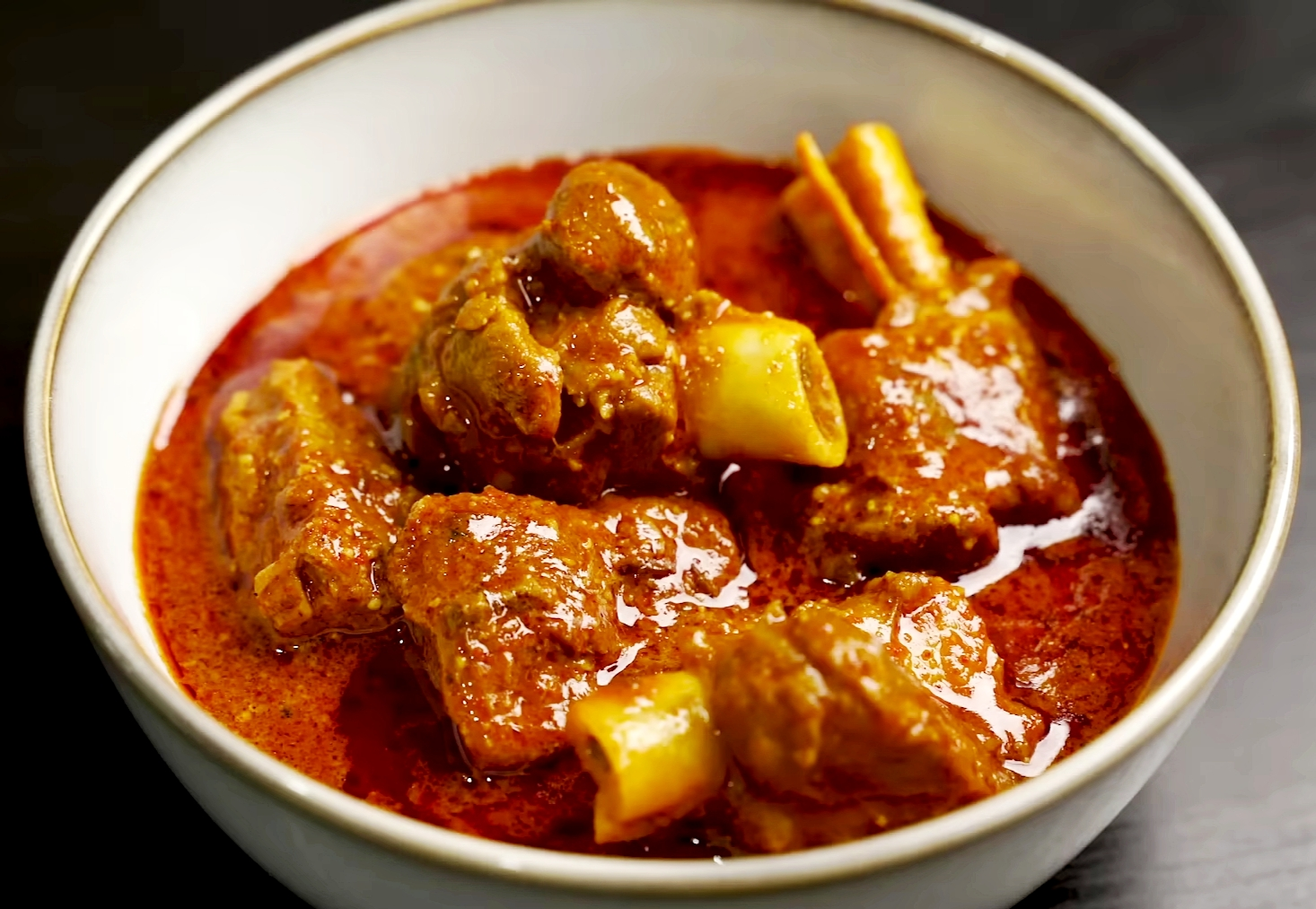
- Rogan josh
- Type: Curry
- Course: Wazwan; Main
- Place of origin: India
- Region or state: Kashmir
- Associated cuisine: Indian
- Serving temperature: Hot
- Main ingredients: Lamb or goat, alkanet root

Rogan josh (Kashmiri: [roːɡan d͡ʒoːʃ]); English: /ˌroʊɡən ˈdʒɒʃ/), also spelled roghan josh or roghan ghosht, is an aromatic curried meat dish originating in the Kashmir Valley of Jammu and Kashmir, India. It is one of the main dishes in the wazwan, the traditional multi-course Kashmiri feast. Rogan josh is made with red meat—traditionally mutton or goat, coloured and flavoured primarily by alkanet flower (or root) and Kashmiri red chillies. In the West, tomatoes are often used instead.

== Etymology ==
A variety of origins of the name have been suggested. Persian: روغن roghen means "ghee, clarified butter" or "oil" in Persian, while Persian: جوش jōš means to "stew" or "braise" and ultimately derives from the verb Persian: جوشاندن jōšīdan, "to boil". Rogan josh, by this definition, would mean "stewed in ghee". An alternative etymology is that the name derives from the Kashmiri language word Kashmiri: roghan, "red", along with either Kashmiri: gošt, "meat", often romanised as "rogan ghosht" or "gosht", or a word meaning "juice", giving possible meanings of "red meat" or "red juice". The exact etymology remains uncertain as both "rogan josh" and "rogan ghosht" are used for the dish, and it is unclear which of the names is the original.

== Origin ==
In Persian cuisine, rogan josh was a dish of meat fried in hot butter. It was brought to North India by the Mughals in the 16th century. According to the food historian Lizzie Collingham, the summer heat of the Gangetic plains of Central India, led the Mughals to spend time in the cooler northern Indian Himalayan region of Kashmir, bringing their cuisine with them. They then made use of Kashmiri herbs to colour and flavour their food. Rogan josh has become a staple of Kashmiri cuisine and is one of the main dishes of the Kashmiri multi-course meal, the wazwan. Chilli peppers became available in India after the Portuguese brought them to Goa early in the 16th century. The ancient spice trade had long since brought other spices from East Asia to the Indian subcontinent.

Rogan Josh has developed from a mildly-spiced Persian dish to an Indian Kashmiri dish red with herbs in the time of the Mughal Empire, to a British Indian restaurant dish red with tomatoes and red peppers. The spice trade had long since brought spices to India.

== Preparation ==
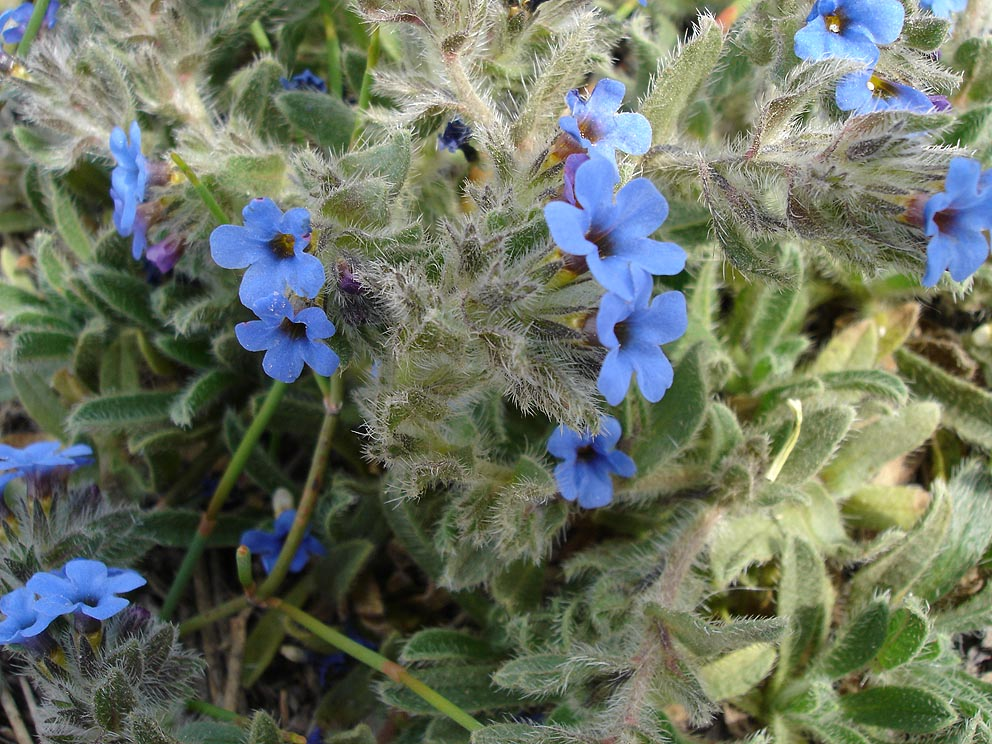
The deep red of rogan josh traditionally comes from herbs such as dyer's alkanet, a plant used as a dyestuff.

Rogan josh consists of pieces of lamb or mutton braised with a gravy flavoured with garlic, ginger and aromatic spices (clove, bay leaves, cardamom, and cinnamon), and in some versions incorporating onions or yoghurt. After initial braising, the dish is often finished using the dampokhtak slow-cooking technique. Its characteristic deep red colour traditionally comes from herbs such as the dried flowers or root of Alkanna tinctoria (ratan jot, dyer's alkanet) or from Kashmiri red chilli (lal mirch).

There are different approaches in preparation. Some use praan, a local form of shallot, and petals of maval, the cockscomb flower, for colouring (and for its supposed "cooling" effect); others add yoghurt and asafoetida to give additional body and flavour.

== Adaptations ==
While the traditional preparation uses whole dried chillies that are de-seeded, soaked in water, and ground to a paste, non-traditional shortcuts use either Kashmiri chilli powder or a mixture of paprika (predominantly) and cayenne pepper, adjusted to taste. Madhur Jaffrey suggests anything from 4 to 16 times as much paprika as cayenne. An updated version served in Sanjeev Kapoor's restaurants uses white and black cardamom, anise, and bay leaves.

Western interpretations of the dish commonly add tomatoes to the sauce. Ready-made pour-over cooking sauces do this to the point where the dish can be considered tomato-based. The authenticity of including tomatoes is disputed: some authors state that tomatoes are not part of the traditional dish or of traditional Indian cuisine and should not be included. British versions combine this with a commercial spice paste, while British Indian restaurants sometimes use both tomatoes and red peppers to obtain the desired red colour. Foreigners such as Americans visiting these restaurants had their first taste of Indian food, helping to spread the dish to other countries.

Some authors have specifically referred to rogan josh as a dish based around meat and tomatoes, while others have identified tomatoes with a Punjabi version of the dish. There is a variety with beef, brisket being preferred.

== See also ==
- Dum aloo
- Goshtaab
- Methi maaz
