= Goshtaab =

Traditional Kashmiri meatball dish

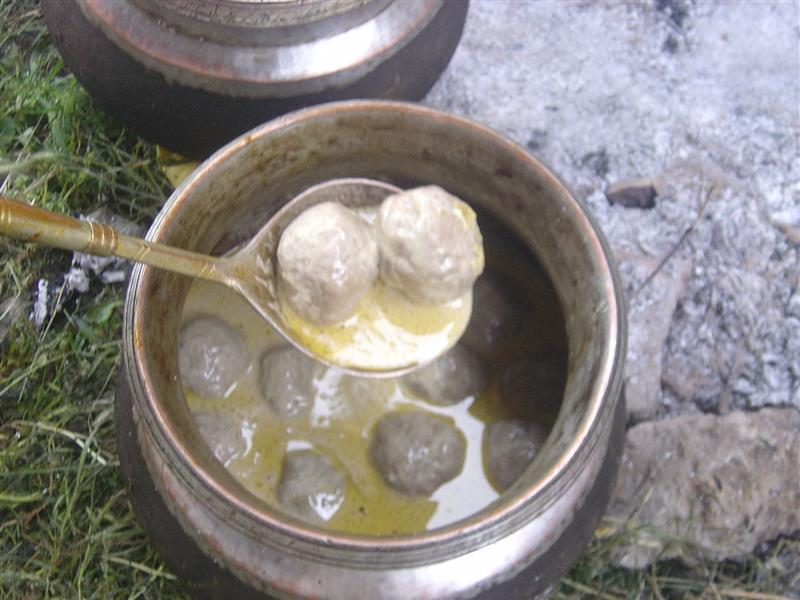
- Goshtaab
- Course: Main course
- Place of origin: Kashmir
- Region or state: Kashmir
- Serving temperature: Hot
- Main ingredients: Minced mutton, yogurt, spices

Goshtaab (Kashmiri pronunciation: [ɡɔʃt̪aːbɨ]), also spelled goshtaba, is a traditional Kashmiri dish that holds a significant place in the region's culinary heritage. Often referred to as the "king of Kashmiri wazwan," goshtab is a rich and aromatic meatball curry made from finely minced mutton, yogurt, and a blend of spices. It is typically served as a final course in the traditional multi-course Kashmiri feast known as wazwan.

The origins of goshtaab are rooted in the culinary traditions of Kashmir, which have been influenced by Central Asian, Persian, and Mughal cuisine. The dish is believed to have been introduced to the region during the reign of the Mughal emperors, who brought with them a tradition of meat-based dishes. Over time, goshtaab evolved into a distinctive Kashmiri specialty, reflecting the region's unique blend of spices and cooking techniques.

== Preparation ==
Goshtaab is made from finely minced mutton, which is pounded to achieve a smooth, paste-like consistency. The meat is then shaped into large, round meatballs and cooked in a flavorful yogurt-based gravy. The gravy is enriched with a blend of aromatic spices, including fennel, cardamom, cloves, and ginger powder, which lend the dish its distinctive flavor. The cooking process is slow, ensuring that the meatballs remain tender and the gravy attains a creamy texture.

The dish is traditionally prepared by wazas (master chefs) in Kashmir, who are experts in the art of wazwan, a multi-course Kashmiri feast. The preparation of goshtaab requires skill and patience, as the meat must be pounded for hours to achieve the desired consistency.

== See also ==
- Rogan josh
- Kashmiri cuisine
- List of lamb dishes
- Noon chai
