= Gangakhed =

- City
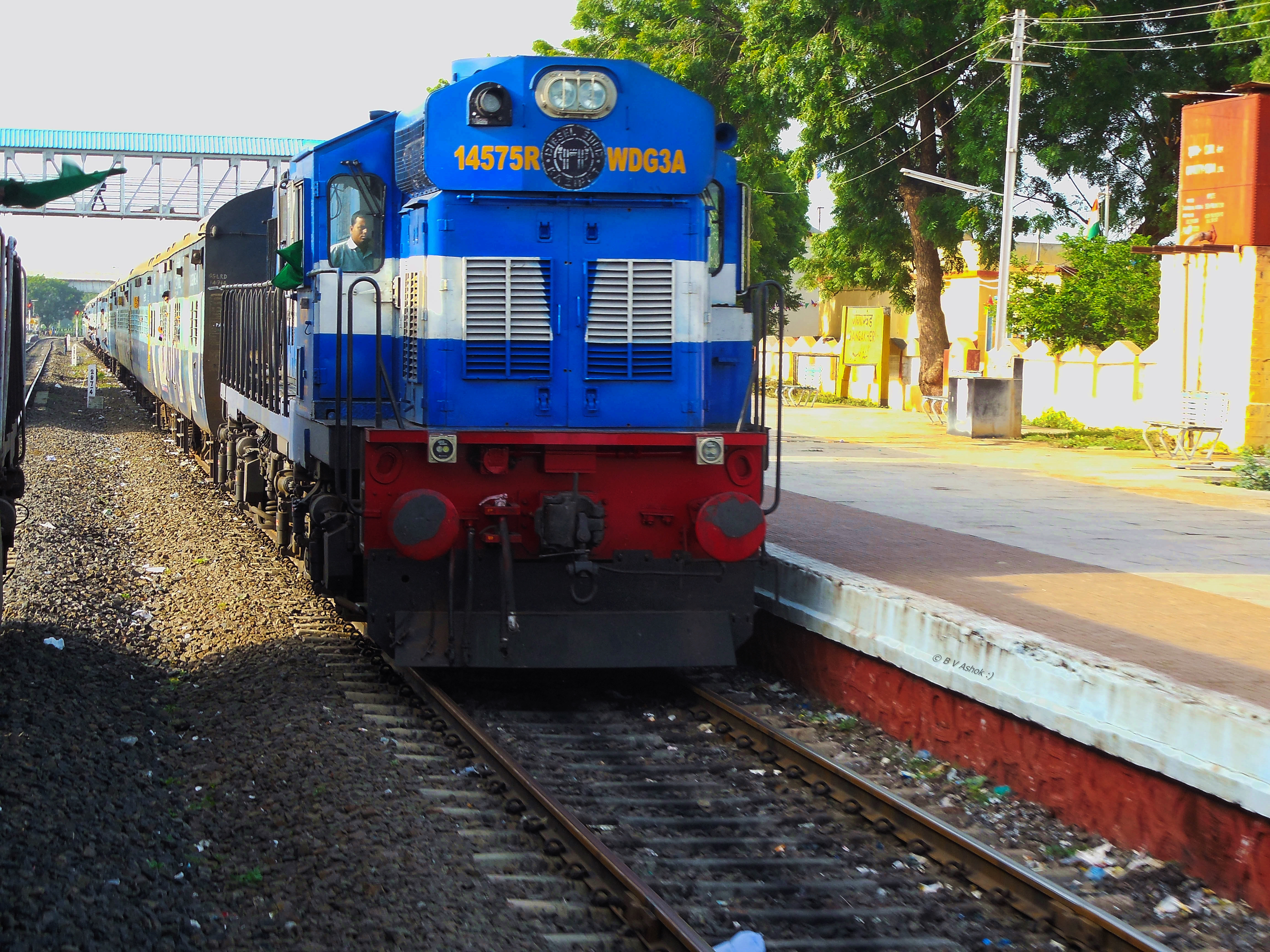
- Gangakhed Railway Station
- Interactive map of Gangakhed
- Coordinates: 18.95°N 76.75°E
- Country: India
- State: Maharashtra
- District: Parbhani

Government
  - Type: Municipal council
- Elevation: 390 m (1,280 ft)

Population (2011)
  - Total: 49,891

Languages
  - Official: Marathi
- Time zone: UTC+5:30 (IST)
- Postal code: 431514
- Vehicle registration: MH-22
- Website: parbhani.gov.in

Gangakhed is a city located on banks of Godavari River and a municipal council in Parbhani district in the state of Maharashtra, India. It is also known as Dakshin Kashi. It is also the second largest city In Parbhani District.

== Demographics ==
As of 2001 India census, Gangakhed had a population of 49500; males constitute 51% of the population and females 49%. Gangakhed has an average literacy rate of 60%, higher than the national average of 59.5%: male literacy is 68%, and female literacy is 52%. In Gangakhed, 16% of the population is under 6 years of age which may have changed significantly through the last decade.

== Education ==
There are many schools in Gangakhed for primary and secondary education. Along with these, there is ACS college governed by "Sant janbai education society"which was established in 1972. It has all educational facilities for three-year degree courses in Arts, Commerce, and Science. There are many small colleges for D.Ed., B.Ed., BCS, BCA. All the colleges in Gangakhed are affiliated with Swami Ramanand Teerth Marathwada University, Nanded.

== Industry and business ==
There is a sugar factory by Ratnakar Gutte with a combined cycle power plant in Gangakhed which caters to the sugarcane farmers in the local region. Several small-scale businesses and business agencies thrive mostly around agricultural sector. There is also edible oil industry which runs by public and private sector.

== Hospitals ==
A government hospital and several private hospitals are operational in the town.

== Hindu temples ==
Gangakhed is the birthplace of Shree Sant Janabai. As it is situated on the bank of Godavari river it has largest number of various temples on the bank of the holy river.

== Transportation ==
=== Railway ===
Gangakhed is a station on the Parbhani to Parli route. Gangakhed is a second class Railway Station, its Station Code is GNH. Gangakhed was a large taluka long ago and it was a very prosperous taluka between Sonpeth and Palam.

Few of the trains halts Parli Vaijnath Purna Passenger, Purna Parli Vaijnath Passenger, Hazur Sahib Nanded Express, Kolhapur Nagpur Express.

=== Road ===
Gangakhed has a Maharashtra State Road Transport Corporation(MSRTC) Bus Stop and a MSRTC maintenance depo. This MSRTC Bus Stop connected to all major cities of Maharashtra and villages in the Gangakhed Taluka. Gangakhed has direct roads to Parbhani, Parli, Nanded, Ahmedpur, Latur.

=== Airway ===
The nearest airport is Shri Guru Gobind Singh Ji Airport, Nanded. The airport is connected to all major cities of India.

== See also ==
- Ranisawargaon
