= GPI =

GPI may refer to:

== Economics ==
- Gender Parity Index
- Genuine progress indicator
- Global Payments Innovation, a faster international payment service by SWIFT

== Education ==
- George Padmore Institute, a British library and archives
- Greenfield Park Primary International School, in Quebec, Canada

== Government and politics ==
- Global Peace Index
- Global Partnership Initiative of the United States State Department

=== Materiel ===
- United States national missile defense#Glide phase interceptors (GPIs)

== Medicine ==
- Generic Product Identifier, a drug classification system
- General paresis of the insane
- Glucose-6-phosphate isomerase, an enzyme
- Glycosylphosphatidylinositol, a glycolipid
- Internal globus pallidus

== Science and technology ==
- Gemini Planet Imager, a telescope instrument
- General Purpose Input, an uncommitted digital signal pin on an integrated circuit or electronic circuit board used as an input and controllable by the user at runtime.
- Gibson Plumage Index, an albatross identification system
- Global Address Space Programming Interface, a Linux API
- Grains per inch
- Granite Peak Installation, an American World-War-II-era biological weapons testing facility

== Transport ==
- Glacier Park International Airport, serving Flathead County, Montana, United States
- Guapi Airport, in Colombia
- Station code for Gunung Putri railway station, in Indonesia

== Other uses ==
- Glass Packaging Institute, an American trade association
- Global Poker Index
- Global Press Institute, an American journalism organization
- Godfrey Phillips India, an Indian tobacco company
- Gurley Precision Instruments, an American manufacturer

== See also ==
- GP1 (disambiguation)
