= Vamanrao Joshi =

Vamanrao (or Wamanrao) Joshi may refer to:

- Vaman Gopal Joshi or Veer Wamanrao Joshi (1881–1956), Marathi journalist, playwright, and freedom fighter, from Maharashtra, India
- Vaman Malhar Joshi (1882–1943), Marathi writer from Maharashtra, India
