= Rajendra Singh Shekhawat =

Indian politician

Rao Saheb shekhawat

Member of Maharashtra Legislative Assembly
- In office 2009–2014
- Preceded by: Sunil Deshmukh
- Succeeded by: Sunil Deshmukh
- Constituency: Amravati

Personal details
- Party: Indian National Congress
- Parent(s): Pratibha Patil (mother); Devisingh Ransingh Shekhawat (father)

Rajendra Singh Shekhawat, also known as Raosaheb Shekhawat, is a politician in the Indian state of Maharashtra. He is a former Member of Legislative Assembly (MLA) for the Amravati constituency of the Maharashtra Legislative Assembly.

== Family ==
Shekhawat is the son of Pratibha Patil, the former President of India, and Devisingh Ramsingh Shekhawat, a former MLA and First Mayor of Amravati. He has a sister.

== Politics ==
Shekhawat, who has a son and a daughter, was a car dealer in Mumbai from 1990 until he became a politician. Prior to being elected to the state legislature in 2009, Shekhawat had worked for the Indian National Congress (INC) for a decade. He had been vice-president of the Amravati District Congress Committee and secretary of the Mumbai Regional Congress Committee, as well as having involvement with the Seva Dal and Youth Congress. He had been looking for an opportunity to be elected since 2004.

Shekhawat won the Amravati Vidhan Sabha seat in the 2009 Maharashtra Legislative Assembly elections. Standing as a candidate of the INC, he defeated the incumbent, Sunil Deshmukh, by 5614 votes. There were accusations that Shekhawat's family connections had influenced the INC decision to select him as a candidate, which had in turn caused Deshmukh - previously himself an INC representative - to stand as an independent. Shekhawat's mother and father had in the past been elected to represent the town in the Lok Sabha and Vidhan Sabha, respectively.

Shekhawat again contested the Amravati seat in the 2014 elections, as also did Deshmukh. On this occasion, it was Deshmukh, now standing as a candidate for the Bharatiya Janata Party, who emerged as winner.
