= GP1 =

GP1, GP-1, GP.1, GP 1 or variants may

== Science and technology ==
- Get Password 1 (computer virus)

=== Astronomy ===
- GP1, IAU Minor Planet Center notation for small solar system bodies
  - (48689) 1996 GP_{1} aka "1996 GP1"
  - (6327) 1991 GP_{1} aka "1991 GP1"

== Vehicles ==
- Gehrlein GP-1, midwing sailplane "GP-1" manufactured by Gehrlein
- González Gil-Pazó GP-1, trainer aircraft
- Petronas FP1, a sport bike, original name GP1
- GP1, an English Racing Automobiles E-type racecar
- GP1, a Soviet gas turbine-electric locomotive design

== Video games ==
- Grand Prix 1, a Formula One video game by Microprose
- GP-1, a motorcycle racing video game by Atlus

== Other uses ==
- Canon de 75 mle GP1, a Belgian 75mm cannon
- GP1, a High Efficiency Video Coding processor used by GoPro
- GP1 (Gesellenprüfung Teil 1), Zwischenprüfung Der KFZ - Mechatroniker Ausbildung

== See also ==
- MotoGP, motorcycle GP class 1
- Formula 1, racecar GP class 1
- GPA (disambiguation)
- GPI (disambiguation)
- GP (disambiguation)
