= Sunil Deshmukh =

Indian politician

Dr. Sunil Deshmukh
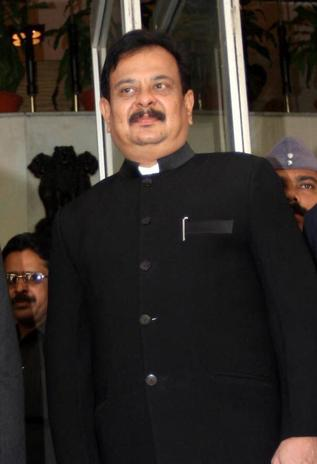
- At the Maharashtra State Budget presentation

Minister of State Government of Maharashtra
- In office 2004–2009
- Minister: Water Resources.; Finance and Planning; Command Area Development and Parliamentary Affairs
- Chief Minister: Vilasrao Deshmukh
- Deputy CM: R. R. Patil
- Guardian Minister: Amravati District

Member of Maharashtra Legislative Assembly
- In office 1999–2009
- Preceded by: Jagdish Gupta
- Succeeded by: Raosaheb Shekhawat
- Constituency: Amravati
- In office 2014–2019
- Preceded by: Raosaheb Shekhawat
- Succeeded by: Sulbha Sanjay Khodke
- Constituency: Amravati

Vice-Chairman of Vidarbha Irrigation Development Corporation
- In office 26 June 2018 – 2020

Personal details
- Born: Sunil Panjabrao Deshmukh; 28 May 1958 (age 68) Amravati, Bombay State, India
- Party: Indian National Congress (2021–Present)
- Other political affiliations: Indian National Congress (1976–2009); Janvikas Congress Party (2009–2014); Bhartiya Janata Party (2014–2021)
- Spouse: Sonali Deshmukh
- Children: 2
- Education: Government Medical College, Nagpur (MBBS and M.D. (Radiology))
- Occupation: Doctor; Politician
- Website: sunildeshmukh.com

Dr. Sunil Panjabrao Deshmukh (born 28 May 1958) is the Member of Legislative Assembly from the constituency of Amravati, Maharashtra, India. He is a member of Indian National Congress (INC). He is a former Minister of State for Finance and Planning, Public Works and Energy in Government of Maharashtra and was also the guardian minister for Amravati and Bhandara districts of Vidarbha, Maharashtra from 2004–2009. He has also served as the ex-officio Vice-Chairman of the Maharashtra State Electricity Board's holding company and was the co-chairman of Maharashtra State Road Development Corporation Ltd.

From October 2004 to December 2008, he held the portfolios for Water Resources, Command Area Development and Parliamentary Affairs in addition to Finance and Planning in former Maharashtra Chief Minister Vilasrao Deshmukh's cabinet. He was also the Vice-Chairman of the Vidarbha Irrigation Development Corporation Ltd. from 1999 to 2004.

He is a formerly practising radiologist. He completed his MBBS from the Government Medical College, Nagpur in 1981. From the same institution, he completed his M.D. (Radiology) in 1986.

He has been elected to the Maharashtra Legislative Assembly thrice from the constituency of Amravati. The first two times, he defeated his nearest contestant, Jagdish Motilal Gupta of the Bharatiya Janata Party (BJP) by about 10,000 votes and about 32,000 votes respectively. The third time, he defeated Raosaheb Shekhawat of the Indian National Congress by a margin of 35,072 votes. He had rebelled from the party in 2009, formed the Janvikas Congress Party, then briefly joined the Bharatiya Janata Party before returning to the Indian National Congress.

== Elected offices ==
- Member of Legislative Assembly - Amravati Vidhan Sabha Constituency - 1999 - 2004
- Member of Legislative Assembly - Amravati Vidhan Sabha Constituency - 2004 - 2009
- Member of Legislative Assembly - Amravati Vidhan Sabha Constituency - 2014 – 2019.

== Other offices ==
- Chairman, Nagpur University Students Council
- President, Maharashtra Pradesh Youth Congress
- State General Secretary, NSUI
- Joint Secretary, All India Youth Congress
- Minister of State (MoS) in the Government of Maharashtra from 2004 - 2009
- Held government portfolios including Finance and Planning, Water Resources, Command Area Development and Parliamentary Affairs in Vilasrao Deshmukh's cabinet
- Held government portfolios including Finance and Planning, Energy, Public Works in Ashok Chavan's cabinet
- Served as the Guardian Minister for Amravati and Bhandara Districts
- Vice-Chairman of Vidarbha Irrigation Development Corporation (VIDC)
- Vice-Chairman of Maharashtra State Electricity Board (MSEB)
- Co-chairman of Maharashtra State Road Development Corporation (MSRDC)
- Chairman, Public Undertakings Committee of Maharashtra Legislature

== Vidhan Sabha elections, 1999 ==
After being appointed the President of Maharashtra Pradesh Youth Congress, Deshmukh revived and strengthened Congress in Amravati by introducing several new and youthful faces. As a fruit of his hard labour, the party put its faith in him for contesting the Assembly polls against BJP's sitting Guardian Minister, Jagdish Gupta. Deshmukh won the polls by almost 10,000 votes and wrested back the constituency for Congress.

== Vidhan Sabha elections, 2004 ==
From 1999 to 2004, Deshmukh undertook developmental works of nearly Rs. 300 crores in his constituency. The people of Amravati gave Congress a massive mandate in 2004 Assembly polls and re-elected him by a margin of 32,263 votes against the same BJP rival whom he had defeated in 1999 polls.

== Guardian Minister of Amravati ==
He served as Guardian Minister of Amravati from 2004 to 2009 in Vilasrao Deshmukh and Ashok Chavan cabinet.

== Vidhan Sabha elections, 2009 ==
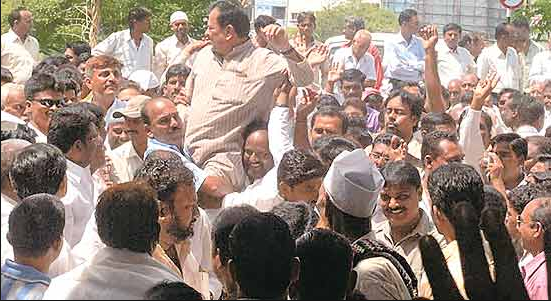
Sunil Deshmukh with supporters during the Vidhan Sabha Election, 2009

In the Maharashtra Vidhan Sabha (Legislative Assembly) elections of 2009 Deshmukh rebelled against his party, the Indian National Congress. Despite being a sitting member from Amravati for the previous two terms his claim to the Amravati seat was overlooked in favour of Raosaheb Shekhawat, the only son of then President of India, Pratibha Patil. It is alleged that Shekhawat got the ticket at behest of his mother, who lobbied strongly for his candidature, while Deshmukh was offered a ticket for the neighbouring Achalpur constituency. Deshmukh refused the offer, saying he could not seek a mandate from a constituency where he has not worked. He was also reportedly offered a Cabinet Ministry and membership of Legislative Council if he withdrew from race as an Independent. Deshmukh refused to withdraw, terming the contest as a fight between "an ordinary man of Amravati" and the combined might of "Rashtrapati Bhavan", state machinery and the Indian National Congress. In a closely contested fight, Deshmukh lost narrowly, polling 55,717 votes against Shekhawat's 61,331.

== Janvikas Congress Party and Amravati Municipal Corporation election, 2012 ==
Having been expelled from the Indian National Congress due to his rebellion in the Vidhan Sabha election, 2009, Deshmukh formed his own political party called Janvikas Congress Party in December 2011. This was done keeping in mind the Amravati Municipal Corporation elections which were conducted in February 2012. His traditional supporters, including three former Mayors of Amravati, joined this party. Janvikas Congress won seven seats in the Amravati Municipal Corporation election.

== Vidhan Sabha Elections, 2014 ==
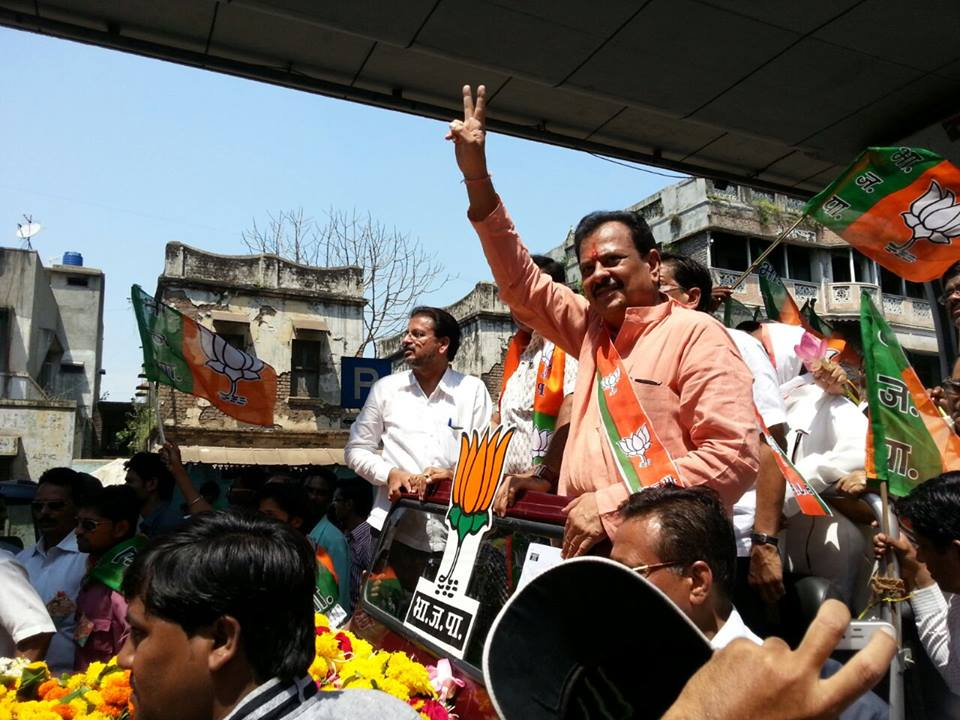
Deshmukh on his way to file his nomination papers from Amravati during the Maharashtra Vidhansabha elections, 2014

In the Maharashtra Vidhan Sabha Elections which were held on 15 October 2014, Deshmukh contested from Amravati constituency on a Bharatiya Janata Party ticket. Nitin Gadkari was reportedly very keen to make Deshmukh the BJP candidate from Amravati. On 26 September 2014, Deshmukh officially joined BJP in the presence of Nitin Gadkari in Nagpur and filled his nomination from Amravati Vidhan Sabha constituency the next day. He defeated sitting MLA, Raosaheb Shekhawat, by 35,072 votes.

In 2017 his party won another 45 seats in Amravati Municipal Council election under Deshmukh's leadership.

== Rejoined Congress ==
On June 17, 2021 it was reported that Sunil Deshmukh was to join the Congress again. He said he is a congressman by heart and does not have any issue with the BJP personally.

== Sources ==
Profile on MSEDCL's website
Official Bio of Maharashtra Finance Ministry's website
Official info on Government of Maharashtra's public portal
Management profile of MSPGCL
Management profile of Maharashtra State Road Development Corporation (MSRDC)
Management profile of Department of Public Works, Government of Maharashtra
