= Amravati Assembly constituency =

Constituency of the Maharashtra legislative assembly in India

Coordinates: 20°55′54.99″N 77°45′55.05″E

Amravati
- Constituency No. 38 for the Maharashtra Legislative Assembly

Constituency details
- Country: India
- Region: Western India
- State: Maharashtra
- District: Amravati
- Lok Sabha constituency: Amravati
- Established: 1952
- Total electors: 374,727
- Reservation: None

Member of Legislative Assembly
- 15th Maharashtra Legislative Assembly
- Incumbent Sulbha Sanjay Khodke
- Party: NCP
- Alliance: NDA
- Elected year: 2024

Amravati Assembly constituency is one of the 288 constituencies of Maharashtra Vidhan Sabha and one of the eight which are located in the Amravati district.

It is a part of the Amravati (Lok Sabha constituency) along with five other Vidhan Sabha assembly constituencies, viz. Badnera, Teosa, Daryapur (SC), Melghat (ST) and Achalpur.

As per orders of Delimitation of Parliamentary and Assembly constituencies Order, 2008, No. 38 Amravati Assembly constituency is composed of the following: 1. Amravati Tehsil (Part), Amravati (M.Corp.) – Ward No. 1 to 5, 19 to 31, 41 to 56 and 62 to 71 of the district.

In 2019 Sulbha Sanjay Khodke defeated incumbent Sunil Deshmukh To become MLA. Indian National Congress is the most successful party in this constituency

== Members of the Legislative Assembly ==
Year	Member	Party
1952	Wamanrao Gopalrao Joshi & Babulal Kashiprasad	Indian National Congress
1957	Maltibai Wamanrao Joshi	Indian National Congress
1962	Umerlalji Mathuradas Kedia	Indian National Congress
1967	K. N. Nawathe	Indian National Congress
1972	Dattatraya Nagorao Metkar	Indian National Congress
1978	Surendra Chatrapal Bhuyar	Indian National Congress (I)
1980	Surendra Chatrapal Bhuyar	Indian National Congress (I)
1985	Devisingh Ransingh Shekhawat	Indian National Congress
1990	Jagdish Motilal Gupta	Bharatiya Janata Party
1995	Jagdish Motilal Gupta	Bharatiya Janata Party
1999	Dr. Sunil Panjabrao Deshmukh	Indian National Congress
2004	Dr. Sunil Panjabrao Deshmukh	Indian National Congress
2009	Rajendra alias Raosaheb Shekhawat	Indian National Congress
2014	Dr. Sunil Panjabrao Deshmukh	Bharatiya Janata Party
2019	Sulbha Khodke	Indian National Congress
2024	Sulbha Khodke	Nationalist Congress Party

== Election results ==
=== Assembly Election 2024 ===
2024 Maharashtra Legislative Assembly election : Amravati
Party	Candidate	Votes	%	±%
NCP	Sulbha Khodke	60,087	28.03	New
INC	Sunil Panjabrao Deshmukh	54,674	25.50	▼22.86
ASP(KR)	Alim Patel Mo. Waheed	54,591	25.46	New
Independent	Jagdish Motilal Gupta	34,067	15.89	New
VBA	Rahul Liladhar Meshram	3,048	1.42	▼8.59
MNS	Pappu Alias Mangesh Madhukar Patil	2,545	1.19	New
NOTA	None of the above	856	0.40	▼0.74
Margin of victory		5,413	2.52	▼8.18
Turnout		215,258	57.44	▲7.43
Total valid votes		214,402		
Registered electors		374,727		▲8.38
NCP gain from INC		Swing	▼20.33	

=== Assembly Election 2019 ===
2019 Maharashtra Legislative Assembly election : Amravati
Party	Candidate	Votes	%	±%
INC	Sulbha Khodke	82,581	48.36	▲17.81
BJP	Sunil Panjabrao Deshmukh	64,313	37.66	▼14.77
VBA	Alim Patel Mo. Waheed	17,103	10.01	New
NOTA	None of the above	1,944	1.14	▲0.50
Independent	Mohhammad Ejaj Mohammad Yunus	1,790	1.05	New
BSP	Dr. Moin Mufeez Deshmukh	1,372	0.80	▼6.43
Margin of victory		18,268	10.70	▼11.18
Turnout		172,918	50.01	▼6.56
Total valid votes		170,779		
Registered electors		345,746		▲20.85
INC gain from BJP		Swing	▼4.07	

=== Assembly Election 2014 ===
2014 Maharashtra Legislative Assembly election : Amravati
Party	Candidate	Votes	%	±%
BJP	Dr. Sunil Panjabrao Deshmukh	84,033	52.43	▲41.00
INC	Rajendra alias Raosaheb Shekhawat	48,961	30.55	▼13.21
BSP	Akhtar Mirza Naim Baig	11,585	7.23	▲6.01
SS	Pradeep Vishnupant Bajad	8,256	5.15	New
IUML	Aashrafi Mohammed Imran Mohammed Yakub	2,244	1.40	New
NCP	Kharkar Ganesh Bapurao	1,030	0.64	New
NOTA	None of the above	1,027	0.64	New
Margin of victory		35,072	21.88	▲17.87
Turnout		161,836	56.57	▲4.56
Total valid votes		160,270		
Registered electors		286,094		▲6.03
BJP gain from INC		Swing	▲8.67	

=== Assembly Election 2009 ===
2009 Maharashtra Legislative Assembly election : Amravati
Party	Candidate	Votes	%	±%
INC	Rajendra Singh Shekhawat	61,331	43.76	▼11.29
Independent	Sunil Panjabrao Deshmukh	55,717	39.76	New
BJP	Pradeep Balwantrao Shingore	16,024	11.43	▼21.88
Independent	Sameer Ratnakar Deshmukh	2,104	1.50	New
BSP	Abdul Raheman Abdul Majid	1,712	1.22	▼3.78
Margin of victory		5,614	4.01	▼17.73
Turnout		140,347	52.01	▼3.47
Total valid votes		140,140		
Registered electors		269,822		▲0.85
INC hold		Swing	▼11.29	

=== Assembly Election 2004 ===
2004 Maharashtra Legislative Assembly election : Amravati
Party	Candidate	Votes	%	±%
INC	Dr. Sunil Panjabrao Deshmukh	81,698	55.05	▲11.32
BJP	Jagdish Motilal Gupta	49,435	33.31	▼2.88
BSP	Yahakha Babakha Pathan	7,414	5.00	▲4.45
Independent	Nitin Nagorao Mohod	5,335	3.60	New
Independent	Haridas Ankush Sirsath	1,788	1.20	New
Independent	Adv. Sudhir Hiraman Tayde	1,115	0.75	New
Margin of victory		32,263	21.74	▲14.20
Turnout		148,451	55.48	▼2.04
Total valid votes		148,396		
Registered electors		267,557		▲13.44
INC hold		Swing	▲11.32	

=== Assembly Election 1999 ===
1999 Maharashtra Legislative Assembly election : Amravati
Party	Candidate	Votes	%	±%
INC	Dr. Sunil Panjabrao Deshmukh	57,270	43.73	▲31.65
BJP	Jagdish Motilal Gupta	47,400	36.19	▼11.63
NCP	Vilas Mahadeorao Ingole	25,063	19.14	New
Margin of victory		9,870	7.54	▼25.29
Turnout		135,666	57.52	▼8.59
Total valid votes		130,974		
Registered electors		235,868		▲2.59
INC gain from BJP		Swing	▼4.09	

=== Assembly Election 1995 ===
1995 Maharashtra Legislative Assembly election : Amravati
Party	Candidate	Votes	%	±%
BJP	Jagdish Motilal Gupta	71,845	47.82	▲15.47
Independent	Mujaffar Ahmad Mo. Yusuf	22,509	14.98	New
INC	Devisingh Ransingh Shekhawat	18,150	12.08	▼16.44
Independent	Vilas Mahadeorao Ingole	13,995	9.31	New
BBM	Ganesh Bapurao Kharkar	6,408	4.26	New
Independent	Mulana Mo. Safdar Mo. Yusuf	4,135	2.75	New
Independent	Prabhakar Ramchandra Sawalakhe	4,091	2.72	New
JD	Ashok Mahadeorao Gaigole	2,116	1.41	New
Margin of victory		49,336	32.83	▲29.00
Turnout		152,005	66.11	▲8.55
Total valid votes		150,255		
Registered electors		229,916		▲19.97
BJP hold		Swing	▲15.47	

=== Assembly Election 1990 ===
1990 Maharashtra Legislative Assembly election : Amravati
Party	Candidate	Votes	%	±%
BJP	Jagdish Motilal Gupta	35,319	32.35	New
INC	Pushpatai Vijay Bonde	31,133	28.52	▼25.70
Independent	Ramkishor Mangilal Somani	25,240	23.12	New
INS(SCS)	Pramod Bharao Wankhade	10,101	9.25	New
BSP	Saikh Mohamad Ali	1,488	1.36	New
Independent	Bijaybhau Gawande	1,127	1.03	New
IPF	Anna Vaidya	789	0.72	New
Margin of victory		4,186	3.83	▼27.72
Turnout		110,310	57.56	▲6.37
Total valid votes		109,173		
Registered electors		191,641		▲40.66
BJP gain from INC		Swing	▼21.87	

=== Assembly Election 1985 ===
1985 Maharashtra Legislative Assembly election : Amravati
Party	Candidate	Votes	%	±%
INC	Devisingh Ransingh Shekhawat	37,330	54.22	New
IC(S)	Chandrabha Alias Chandraprabha Narendra Boke	15,612	22.68	New
Independent	Mohmad Safdar Mohmad Yusuf	12,378	17.98	New
Independent	Mehbubkhan Ajijkhan Shadar	1,178	1.71	New
Independent	Sheike Gunwant Champat	668	0.97	New
Independent	Vilas Raibhan Grodeswar	508	0.74	New
Margin of victory		21,718	31.55	▲2.34
Turnout		69,739	51.19	▲7.59
Total valid votes		68,843		
Registered electors		136,241		▲10.28
INC gain from INC(I)		Swing	▼1.57	

=== Assembly Election 1980 ===
1980 Maharashtra Legislative Assembly election : Amravati
Party	Candidate	Votes	%	±%
INC(I)	Surendra Chatrapal Bhuyar	29,712	55.79	▲5.19
INC(U)	Sudhakar Ramchandra Sawalakhe	14,155	26.58	New
BJP	Maltibai Wamanrao Joshi	8,821	16.56	New
Independent	Bhimrao Sitaram Nitanwar	391	0.73	New
Margin of victory		15,557	29.21	▲5.28
Turnout		53,859	43.60	▼22.84
Total valid votes		53,261		
Registered electors		123,540		▲5.95
INC(I) hold		Swing	▲5.19	

=== Assembly Election 1978 ===
1978 Maharashtra Legislative Assembly election : Amravati
Party	Candidate	Votes	%	±%
INC(I)	Surendra Chatrapal Bhuyar	38,507	50.60	New
JP	Munirkhan Usmankhan	20,296	26.67	New
INC	Umarlalji Mathuradasji Kedia	12,843	16.88	▼68.23
Independent	Kolhatkar Vasnatrao Ramkrishnarao	2,837	3.73	New
Margin of victory		18,211	23.93	▼51.86
Turnout		77,466	66.44	▲14.24
Total valid votes		76,098		
Registered electors		116,603		▲23.13
INC(I) gain from INC		Swing	▼34.51	

=== Assembly Election 1972 ===
1972 Maharashtra Legislative Assembly election : Amravati
Party	Candidate	Votes	%	±%
INC	Dattatraya Nagorao Metkar	41,157	85.11	▲41.24
ABJS	Satappa Shioappa Kolhe	4,505	9.32	▼3.15
AIFB	Devidas Laxmanrao Kaware	2,227	4.61	New
Independent	Pralhad Pandurang Dhanke	470	0.97	New
Margin of victory		36,652	75.79	▲73.82
Turnout		49,438	52.20	▼7.44
Total valid votes		48,359		
Registered electors		94,700		▲8.16
INC hold		Swing	▲41.24	

=== Assembly Election 1967 ===
1967 Maharashtra Legislative Assembly election : Amravati
Party	Candidate	Votes	%	±%
INC	K. N. Nawathe	21,634	43.87	▼8.34
SSP	B. D. Karanjikar	20,663	41.90	New
ABJS	D. V. Khedkar	6,147	12.47	New
Independent	A. S. Dohle	662	1.34	New
Margin of victory		971	1.97	▼11.08
Turnout		52,220	59.64	▼10.96
Total valid votes		49,312		
Registered electors		87,558		▲10.70
INC hold		Swing	▼8.34	

=== Assembly Election 1962 ===
1962 Maharashtra Legislative Assembly election : Amravati
Party	Candidate	Votes	%	±%
INC	Umerlalji Mathuradas Kedia	27,838	52.21	▼22.93
Independent	Gopal Dattatraya Kaloti	20,878	39.16	New
ABJS	Devidas Vishwanath Khedkar	2,791	5.23	New
Independent	Shriram Shaligram Malviya	1,309	2.45	New
Margin of victory		6,960	13.05	▼41.11
Turnout		55,842	70.60	▲22.76
Total valid votes		53,321		
Registered electors		79,098		▲27.07
INC hold		Swing	▼22.93	

=== Assembly Election 1957 ===
1957 Bombay State Legislative Assembly election : Amravati
Party	Candidate	Votes	%	±%
INC	Maltibai Wamanrao Joshi	22,376	75.14	▲23.45
Independent	Usha Namdeo	6,248	20.98	New
RRP	Ramnath Ramgopal	1,154	3.88	New
Margin of victory		16,128	54.16	▲49.05
Turnout		29,778	47.84	▼53.94
Total valid votes		29,778		
Registered electors		62,247		▼31.69
INC hold		Swing	▲46.74	

=== Assembly Election 1952 ===
1952 Hyderabad State Legislative Assembly election : Amravati
Party	Candidate	Votes	%	±%
INC	Wamanrao Gopalrao Joshi	26,338	28.40	New
INC	Babulal Kashiprasad	21,598	23.29	New
SCF	Krishnarao Nanduji Patil	9,166	9.88	New
Socialist	Ramratan Sheocharan Pande	8,423	9.08	New
CPI	Bhalchandra Krishnarao Diwanji	8,189	8.83	New
ABJS	Devidas Vishvanath Khedekar	4,382	4.72	New
ABJS	Rajaram Akatrao Gayakwad	4,285	4.62	New
Independent	Vaikunthanath Gopinath Mishra	3,912	4.22	New
Margin of victory		4,740	5.11	
Turnout		92,745	101.78	
Total valid votes		92,745		
Registered electors		91,126		
INC win (new seat)				

== See also ==
- Amravati
- Achalpur
- Sunil Deshmukh
- Amravati district
- Badnera
