= Anjangaon Bari =

Village in Maharashtra

Coordinates: 20°49′N 77°47′E

- Village
- Location within Maharashtra Location within India
- Country: India
- District: Amravati

Population (2011)
  - Total: 7,257

Anjangaon Bari is a village in Amravati district, Maharashtra, India.

== Demographics ==
Per the 2011 Census of India, Anjangaon Bari has a total population of 7257; of those 3711 are male and 3546 are female.
