= List of cities in Vidarbha =

Cities in Vidarbha, Maharashtra

Vidarbha is an easternmost region of Indian state of Maharashtra comprising Nagpur Division and Amravati Division. It occupies 31.6% of total area and holds 21.3% of total population of Maharashtra.

Nagpur is the largest city of Vidarbha as well as in central India followed by Amravati. A total of 4 cities of Vidarbha region have municipal corporations.

== List of cities ==
Following is the list of top 30. cities with their populations according to 2011. District headquarters are shown in bold letters.

Rank	Name	District	Type	Population	Administrative Body
1	Nagpur	Nagpur	City	2,405,665	Nagpur Municipal Corporation
2	Amravati	Amravati	City	647,057	Amravati Municipal Corporation
3	Akola	Akola	City	427,146	Akola Municipal Corporation
4	Chandrapur	Chandrapur	City	320,379	Chandrapur Municipal Corporation
6	Gondia	Gondia	City	132,821	Gondia Municipal Council
5	Yavatmal	Yavatmal	City	2,48949	Yavatmal Municipal Council
7	Achalpur	Amravati	City	112,311	Achalpur Municipal Council
8	Wardha	Wardha	City	106,444	Wardha Municipal Council
9	Hinganghat	Wardha	City	101,805	Hinganghat Municipal Council
10	Khamgaon	Buldhana	City	94,191	Khamgaon Municipal Council
11	Akot	Akola	City	92,637	Akot Municipal Council
12	Bhandara	Bhandara	City	91,845	Bhandara Municipal Council
13	Ballarpur	Chandrapur	City	89,452	Ballarpur Municipal Council
14	Kamptee	Nagpur	U.A	86,793	Kamptee Municipal Council
15	Washim	Washim	City	78,387	Washim Municipal Council
16	Pusad	Yavatmal	City	73,046	Pusad Municipal Council
17	Karanja Lad	Washim	City	67,907	Karanja Lad Municipal Council
18	Malkapur	Buldhana	City	67,740	Malkapur Municipal Council
19	Buldhana	Buldhana	City	67,431	Buldhana Municipal Council
20	Bhadravati	Chandrapur	City	60,565	Bhadravati Municipal Council
21	Shegaon	Buldhana	City	59,672	Shegaon Municipal Council
22	Wani	Yavatmal	City	58,840	Wani Municipal Council
23	Chikhli	Buldhana	City	57,889	Chikhali Municipal Council
24	Anjangaon	Amravati	City	56,380	Anjangaon Surji Municipal Council
25	Gadchiroli	Gadchiroli	City	54,152	Gadchiroli Municipal Council
26	Umred	Nagpur	City	53,971	Umred Municipal Council
27	Warud	Amravati	City	50,482	Warud Municipal Council
28	Umarkhed	Yavatmal	City	47,458	Umarkhed Municipal Council
29	Warora	Chandrapur	City	46,532	Warora Municipal Council
30	Mehkar	Buldhana	City	45,248	Mehkar Municipal Council
