= Sanjay Khodke =

Indian politician

Member of Maharashtra Legislative Council
- Incumbent
- Assumed office 20 March 2025
- Preceded by: Rajesh Vitekar
- Constituency: elected by the Members of Legislative Assembly

Personal details
- Born: Sanjay Vinayakrao Khodke
- Party: Nationalist Congress Party (2018-Present)
- Other political affiliations: Indian National Congress (Before 2018)
- Spouse: MLA Sulbha Khodke

Sanjay Vinayakrao Khodke is an Indian politician from Maharashtra and a member of the Nationalist Congress Party (Ajit Pawar). In 2025, He was elected as a member of the Maharashtra legislative Council. His wife Sulbha Khodke is Currently MLA from Amravati Assembly constituency.
