= P. R. Patil Group of Educational Institutes =

Coordinates: 20.9852°N 77.7556°E

P. R. Pote Patil Group of Educational Institutes, Amravati (PRPGEI)
- Established: 2008
- Director: Dr. S. A. Ladhake
- Location: (India) Amravati, Maharashtra
- Campus: 100 acres (400,000 m^{2})

The P. R. Pote Patil Group of Educational Institutes is established by P.R.Pote Patil Educational Welfare Trust, Amravati. It has been set up on a 100-acre campus and is AICTE (New Delhi) approved. The institution is affiliated with Sant Gadge Baba Amravati University and is also recognized by the NAAC with an A Grade. The institute conducts a technical fest, Techelons every year with some of the most prominent international guest speakers. The group also arranges an International study tour, free of cost to the students every year. The institute has the best campus placements in the Vidarbha region with more than 70 companies visiting the campus for campus placements.

== Management ==
- Mentor: Hon. Ramchandraji Pote
- President: Hon. Mr. Pravin R. Pote, State Minister, Maharashtra
- Vice-president: Hon. Mr. Shreyash kumar

== Director ==
- Dr. S. A. Ladhake

== Following colleges run under P. R. Pote Patil Group of Educational Institutes, Amravati ==
P. R. Pote Patil College Of Engineering & Management, Amravati

- Principal, Dr. D. T. Ingole
- Vice Principal, Dr. Mohammad Zuhair

Head Of Department

- Applied Science and Humanities: Prof. H. S. Kulat
- Mechanical Engineering: Dr. P. R. Wadnerkar
- Computer Science & Engineering: Dr. A. B. Gadicha
- Electronics & Telecommunication Engineering: Dr. R.D. Ghongade
- Electrical and Power: Prof. D. A. Shahakar (PhD-Pursuing)
- Civil Engineering: Dr. S.S. Saraf
- Master of Business Administration: Prof. S.S.Shah (PhD-Pursuing)
- Master of Computer Application: Prof. A. P. Bhande
- Head of Corporate Relations: Prof. Monica Upadhyday Jain

P. R. Pote Patil College of Architecture, Amravati

- Principal, Prof. Sarang Holey

P. R. Pote Patil College of Pharmacy, Amravati

- Principal, Dr. Mukund Tawar

P. R. Pote Patil College of Agriculture, Amravati

- Principal, Prof. Pramod D. Deshmukh

P. R. Pote Patil College of Education, Amravati

- Principal, Dr. Anuprita Deshmukh

P. R. Pote Patil Institute & Hospital of Medical Sciences Ayurved, Amravati

- In-charge Principal, Dr. Chaitanya Kawalkar

P. R. Pote Patil International School & Junior College, Amravati

- Principal, Mr. Sachin Durge

== Techelons ==
P.R. Patil Group of Educational Institutes (PRPGEI) has built and maintained a reputation of imparting the right mix of education, experience and ethics that form the basis for achieving success in the modern world. "TECHELONS....Step to pioneer"- Just as energy is the basis of life itself and ideas the source of innovation, so is innovation the vital spark of all human change, improvement and progress. "TECHELONS" provide an opportunity to beautiful minds for creativity and innovation to build knowledge based society with multiple opportunities. The event is organised every year with an objective to provide a platform to budding beautiful minds to exhibit the talent, technical skill to enrich their competency, to lead the world in the knowledge based 21st century. College started its technical event called Techelons in Jan 2011.This event was inaugurated by Dr. A.P.J. Abdul Kalam, Dr.Vijay Bhatkar.

In 2012, Techelons was organised from 28 Jan to 31 Jan. It was inaugurated by various dignitaries, including:

- Hon. Rajesh Tope (Minister, Higher Tech. Education. M.S)
- Hon. Rajendra Mulak (Minister of States- Energy, Irrigation. M.S)
- Hon. Dr. Raghunath Mashelkar (Former Director General, CSIR, New Delhi)
- Hon. Dr. Vijay Bhatkar ("father of the supercomputer")
- Hon. Dr. Dinesh Keskar (vice president of Boeing International)
- Hon. Dr. Kiran Bedi (Ist Lady IPS officer)
- Hon. Dr. Maninderjeet Singh Bitta (chairman, All- India Anti Terrorist Front)
- Hon. Dr. P. M. Khodke (director of MSBTE)
- Hon. Dr. Mohan Khedkar (V.C., SGBAU, Amravati)
- Hon. Atul Kahate (chiefi executive officer of Oracle)
- Hon. Venugopal Dhoot (chairman of Videocon)
- Hon. Suhas Gopinath (chief executive officer and president of Global INC)
- Hon. Sanjeev Bambal (Director of Cognizant)
- Hon. Sameer Bendre (Head Persistent, Nagpur)
- Hon. Arti Kirloskar (Executive Member, Kirloskar Group, Pune)

From 2013 to till this month May, 2019 following dignitaries invited to the campus in Techelons to guide and mentor students

- Hon. Mohd. Younus, Nobel Prize Winner, founder and chairman of Gramin Bank Bangladesh
- Hon. Chetan Bhagat, writer
- Hon. Anurima Sinha, first female amputee to climb Mount Everest
- Hon. Dr. Narendra Jadhao, member of planning commission of India
- Hon. Dr. Suresh Naik, former group director, ISRO
- Hon. Mr. Sujeet Banarjee, director, Department of Science and Technology government of India
- Hon. Mr. Gaur Gopal Das, International Life Coach, ISKON
- Hon. Dr. Rajendra Singh, Waterman, Nobel Prize winner
- Hon. Mr. Kumar Vishwas, poet and social worker
- Hon. B. K. Shivani, teacher, Brahmakumari's world spiritual university
