= Panjabrao Deshmukh =

Indian social activist and politician (1898–1965)

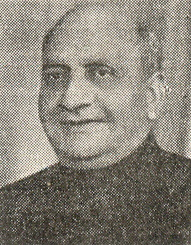

Minister of Food and Agriculture
- In office 17 April 1952 – 10 April 1962 (As Minister of State)
- Prime Minister: Jawaharlal Nehru
- Preceded by: Position established
- Succeeded by: Ram Subhag Singh
- In office 29 October 1954 – 25 November 1954 (Without cabinet rank)
- Prime Minister: Jawaharlal Nehru
- Preceded by: Rafi Ahmed Kidwai
- Succeeded by: Ajit Prasad Jain

Member of Parliament, Lok Sabha
- In office 27 March 1952 – 10 April 1965
- Succeeded by: Vimal Punjab Deshmukh
- Constituency: Amravati

Member of Constituent Assembly of India
- In office 9 December 1946 – 25 January 1950
- Constituency: Central Provinces and Berar

Personal details
- Born: Panjabrao Shamrao Deshmukh; 27 December 1898 Papal, Berar Province, British India (now in Maharashtra, India)
- Died: 10 April 1965 (aged 66) Delhi, India
- Party: Indian National Congress
- Other political affiliations: Independent Labour Party; Satyashodhak Samaj
- Spouse: Vimal Punjab Deshmukh
- Children: 1
- Education: Fergusson College; University of Cambridge (M.A.), (Ph.D.)
- Profession: Lawyer, politician, social activist
- Nickname(s): Krishi Ratna; Bhausaheb

Panjabrao Shamrao Deshmukh (Kadam) (27 December 1898 – 10 April 1965), also known as Bhausaheb Deshmukh, was a social activist and a leader to farmers in India. He was the Minister of Agriculture in the cabinet of Jawaharlal Nehru in 1954.

== Early life ==
He was born into a Maratha-Kunbi family at Papal in the Amravati district of Maharashtra on 27 December 1898, his family practised agriculture. His father's name is Shamrao and mother's name is Radhabai. His original surname was Kadam. After completing his primary education in his hometown, he was sent to Songaon and then to Karanja Lad. At Karanja Lad, he reached ninth grade, before he was admitted into Hind High School, Amravati, and Fergusson College in Pune.

At that time, higher education was not available in India. Many students travelled to England for further education. He wanted to be a barrister from University of Cambridge. Despite intense poverty at home, he managed to obtain enough money to travel. He then went to the University of Cambridge and gained a Ph.D., a barrister degree in 1921 and a M.A. honours in Sanskrit. He finished his Ph.D. with the subject Origin and Development of Religion in Vedic Literature.

== Social activities ==
He studied under Satyashodhak Samaj of Jyotirao Phule. He did satyagraha to allow untouchables to enter Ambabai Temple, Amravati, which was condemned by the upper castes. B. R. Ambedkar supported him in this movement. The management of the temple later allowed untouchables to enter the temple. Dr. Punjabrao Deshmukh started another equality movement from his home. After the death of his father, his mother asked him to conduct traditional activity "Shradhha" with Brahmins. He brought untouchable students home from his school hostel and his mother treated them as Brahmins.

His marriage ceremony was simple and held in Mumbai. After the marriage ceremony, when he reached Amravati, his friends convinced Deshmukh to give a party. He held a small dinner party for them. The meal was served by youths wearing white. After dinner Bhausaheb stated that the servers were untouchables (violating the prohibition). Many such events were conducted by Dr. Deshmukh to remove untouchability from our society.

== Educational activist ==
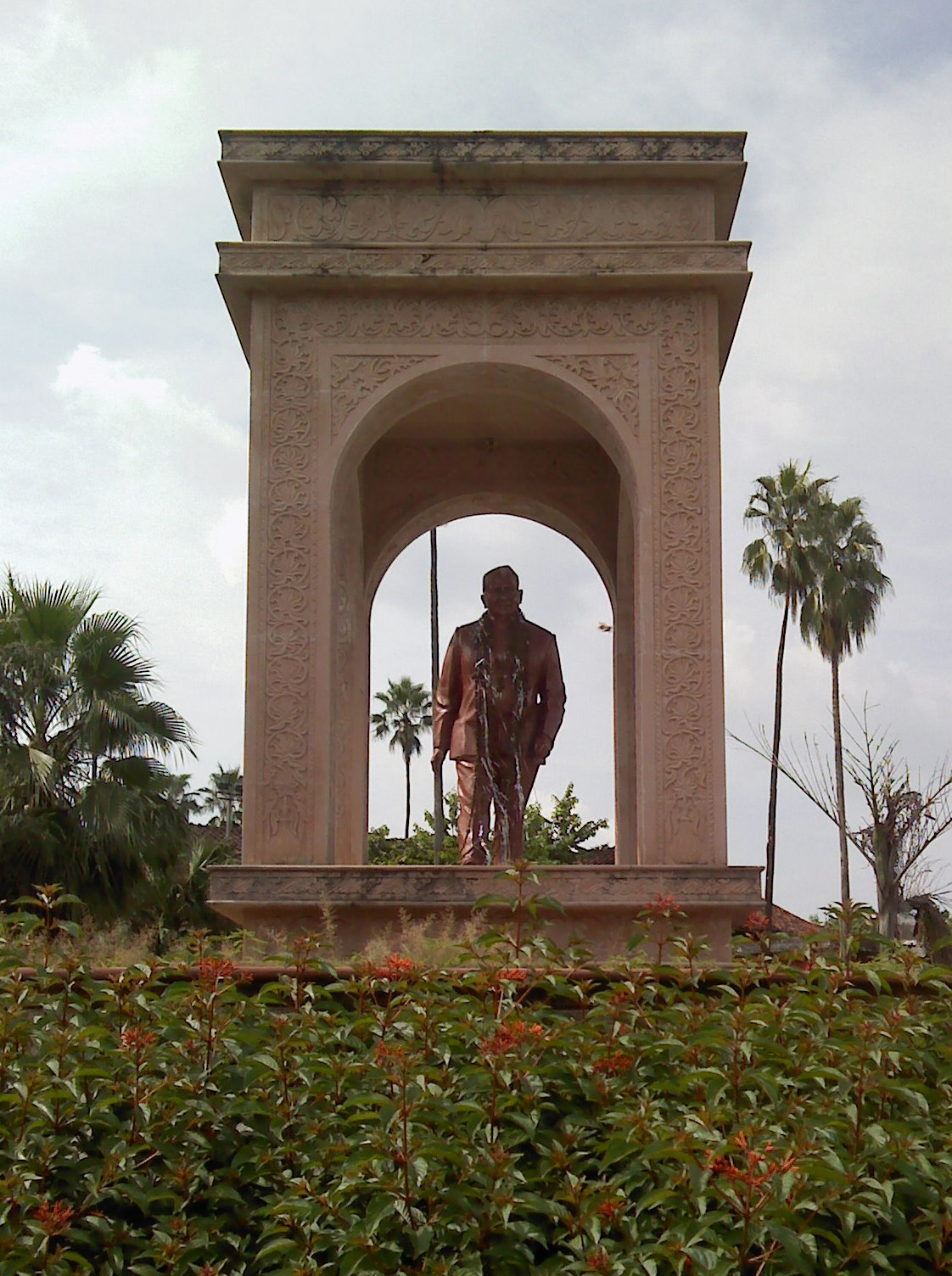
Statue of Deshmukh at the Punjabrao Deshmukh Agricultural University in Nagpur.

In 1932 he established Shivaji Education Society at Amravati. This education society grew to become the second largest in Maharashtra. In 2023, the society operated 269 educational sites in a variety of fields. This included 24 degree colleges, 54 intermediate colleges, 75 high schools, and 35 hostels. An agricultural university bearing his name operates at Akola, i.e. Dr. Panjabrao Deshmukh Krishi Vidyapeeth. He strengthened the foundation of education throughout Maharashtra.

== Politics ==
He was elected thrice for the Lok Sabha. He represented the constituency of Central Provinces and Berar. Dr. Deshmukh was selected by Nehru as Minister of the first State Agriculture. He served for 10 years, from 1952 to 1962. He played an important role in the making of the Constitution of India. He was inspired by B. R. Ambedkar and was a supporter of the mission by Dr. Babasaheb Ambedkar. He was the secretary for Vidarbha region of the Independent Labour Party, established by B. R. Ambedkar.

== Leader of peasants ==
He dedicated his talent and energy for the formulation and implementation of the policies that would bring prosperity to agriculture and the agriculturist. He launched a campaign called Food for Millions in 1955. He established the Bharat Krishak Samaj Society in 1956. He introduced the Japanese method of rice cultivation in 1958 and organised the World Agriculture Fair in 1959. The fair was visited by dignitaries across the world, including President of the United States Dwight D. Eisenhower, Soviet first secretary Nikita Khrushchev, Lord Mountbatten and Lady Mountbatten.

He started the process of establishing agricultural universities across the country and supported agricultural education and research.

== Lawyer ==
Deshmukh was elected to the provincial law board in 1930.

He appeared for poor peasants in many cases at the district court of Amravati. His most predominant case was British Government vs. Azad Hind Sena, in which he assisted Jawaharlal Nehru.

== Legacy ==
Dr. Deshmukh died on 10 April 1965 at Delhi. He was survived by his wife, the lawyer and educationalist Vimal Punjab Deshmukh. They had one son.

The 'Dr. Panjabrao Deshmukh Center for Monitoring Regional Economy' at Sant Gadge Baba Amravati University was created in 2011 and named after him.

The 'Dr. Panjabrao Deshmukh College of Law' in Amravati was also named after him.

The 'Dr. Panjabrao Deshmukh Nursing Institute' in Amravati is named after him.

A commemorative stamp was issued in his honour in 1999.
