= GPA (disambiguation) =

GPA may refer to:

== Education ==
- Grade point average
- Grace Preparatory Academy, in Arlington, Texas, United States
- Government Polytechnic Amravati, in Maharashtra, India

== Government and politics ==
- Agreement on Government Procurement of the World Trade Organization
- Gambia Ports Authority
- Georgia Ports Authority, in the U.S. state of Georgia
- Government Property Agency (Hong Kong)
- Government Property Agency (United Kingdom)
- Green Party of Alberta
- Guam Power Authority

== Science and medicine ==
- Generalized Procrustes analysis
- Geometric phase analysis
- Gigapascal (GPa), a unit of pressure
- Glenopolar angle
- Gradient pattern analysis
- Granulomatosis with polyangiitis
- Gravida/para/abortus, in medicine
- Gravity Probe A (GP-A), an experiment to test the theory of general relativity
- Guanidinopropionic acid
- (Gas phase) Proton affinity

== Sport ==
- Gaelic Players Association, Ireland, represents players of Gaelic games
- Gambia Ports Authority FC
- Gross Production Average, in baseball

== Other uses ==
- GPA (company), a Brazilian retailer
- Araxos Airport, serving Patras, Greece
- Ford GPA, an amphibious vehicle
- Gay Police Association, in the United Kingdom
- Global Peace Agency, a fictional DC Comics organization
- Guinness Peat Aviation, a defunct Irish company
- GNU Privacy Assistant, a graphical frontend to GNU Privacy Guard
- Personal Service Workers' Union, a former Austrian trade union
