= Shivaji Education Society =

Largest educational society in Vidarbha

The Shivaji Education Society is the largest Indian educational society in Vidarbha. It was established by social activist and politician Dr. Panjabrao Deshmukh at Amravati. The society is associated with arts, commerce and science colleges, a management college in Nagpur, an engineering college in Akola, and a medical college in Amravati. It has a widespread network of school and colleges in Vidarbha.

The Shivaji Education Society, Amravati is a premier educational institution of Central India with branches in all the districts of Vidarbha in Maharashtra. It is registered as a Public Charitable Trust (R.N. F/89).

The society was registered in December 1932. In 1958, it included a primary school, 7 middle schools and 8 colleges. As of 2025, the society runs 24 senior colleges, 54 junior colleges, 75 middle schools, and 35 hostels mainly within the region of Vidarbha but also in other parts of the state.

The educational institutions offer courses in various areas, such as agriculture, biotechnology, engineering, horticulture, information technology, law, medicine, and microbiology. It also runs a co-educational polytechnic college in Amravati.

The Shivaji Education Society was founded by Dr. Panjabrao in 1931 or 1932. Along with other members, Bhausaheb worked in aim of improving the education system in Vidarbha by establishing school and colleges across the region. The society was awarded the Dr. Babasaheb Ambedkar "Dalit Mitra" Award in 1993–94 by the Government of Maharashtra. In the year 1999-2000 the Society was awarded the Gadge Maharaj Memorial Award. On 5 September 2000, Maharashtra declared it the "Best Administered Society" in the state and awarded it Rs. 1 lakh. In its citation, the state formally recognized the society's seminal contribution to the field of education and cultural advancement.

It received a grant of 50,000 from the 7th Nizam (Mir Osman Ali Khan) in the 1940s.

== Missions ==
- To build a network of schools and colleges for educating the masses
- To undertake rural development programme for the upliftment of villages and the rural areas with such instruments like the rural development institutes and its like
- To establish farmers' association for safeguarding their interests and for ventilating their grievances
- To disseminate the latest knowledge and technology in farming, so that the people of this region are always in the flow of the latest currents worldwide
- To open Shri Shivaji Loka Vidyapeeth to speed up the programme of cultural renaissance and advancement of knowledge
- To undertake an exclusive programme for caste eradication, social reformation and freedom from debt of the farmers and peasants
