= Manzar Bhopali =

Indian Urdu poet (born 1959)

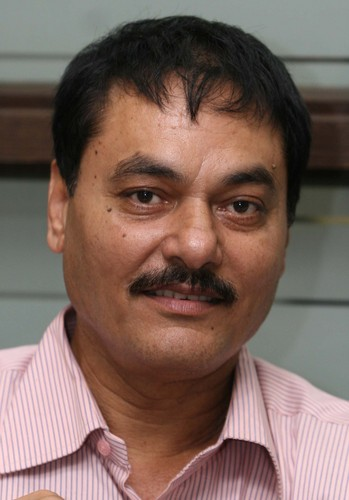
- Born: Syed Ali Raza; 29 December 1959 (age 66); Amravati, Bombay State, India
- Education: MA (Urdu)
- Alma mater: Barkatullah University
- Occupations: Poet, writer
- Spouse: Tabassum Manzar
- Relatives: Sajid Rizvi (brother)
- Writing career
- Language: Urdu, Hindi
- Genres: Ghazal, nazm, geet
- Subject: Urdu poetry

Syed Ali Raza (born 29 December 1959), known by his takhallus (pen name) Manzar Bhopali, is an Indian Urdu poet based in Bhopal. Primarily a writer of ghazals, he is best known as a performer at mushairas (poetry gatherings), where his melodious recitation has made him a regular on the international circuit since the late 1980s. He has published more than a dozen collections in Urdu and Hindi.

== Early life and education ==
Manzar Bhopali was born on 29 December 1959 in Amravati and moved with his family to Bhopal at a young age, where he was raised and educated; he later completed an MA in Urdu. His father, Mir Abbas Ali, was a poet involved in literature, and his grandfather, Mir Khairat Ali, was a well-known hakim (traditional physician). His mother, Tahira Nikhat, was a school principal in Bhopal who worked in particular for girls' education; she died in March 2014, aged 80. His brother Sajid Rizvi is a retired television producer.

He grew up in a household where poetry was part of everyday conversation, and has described the Bhopal literary milieu of Kaif Bhopali, Asad Bhopali and Bashir Badr as formative.

== Career ==
Manzar Bhopali began writing poetry at 14 and first recited at a mushaira at 17. He was a disciple (shagird) of the poet Raza Rampuri. His first major mushaira appearance was in Dewas, Madhya Pradesh.

Manzar Bhopali (left) with the painter S. H. Raza (centre) and his wife (right) at the launch of one of his books in Bhopal, 1997

He first performed abroad at an international mushaira in Karachi in 1987, and has since toured the United States, Canada, Australia, Pakistan, Saudi Arabia, Oman, Qatar, the United Arab Emirates and the United Kingdom, among other countries. His first visit to the United States was in 1991. In 2005 he was among the poets at the annual Aalmi Mushaira held at Karachi's National Stadium, and at the 2012 edition, The Express Tribune reported that his melodious recitation drew applause from a restless crowd.

During the same 2012 tour, Manzar Bhopali and fellow Indian poet Iqbal Ashar were caught in gunfire outside a mushaira venue in Karachi's Clifton area on 25 March; they took cover for about ten minutes before being escorted to safety, and the mushaira went ahead as scheduled.

Manzar Bhopali with Tariq Jameel and a copy of his memoir Aitbar-e-Adab, Sydney, September 2026

He shared stages over the decades with poets including Jaun Elia, Ahmad Faraz, Nida Fazli, Parveen Shakir, Gopaldas Neeraj and Rahat Indori, with whom he had a close friendship; his memoir of these encounters, Aitbar-e-Adab, marks fifty years in literature. On the death of Bashir Badr in May 2026, he recalled a 35-year association with Badr, including many mushairas together in India and abroad.

=== Film ===
Manzar Bhopali appears as one of several real-life poets in the mushaira sequence of the 2014 film Dedh Ishqiya, alongside Anwar Jalalpuri, Nawaz Deobandi, Gyan Prakash and Javed Arshi; the verses recited in the scene were written by Bashir Badr.

== Poetry and style ==
Rekhta describes him as primarily a ghazal poet who has also experimented with other forms, and identifies his melodious voice and forceful delivery as his hallmarks. One of his best-known couplets, telling Mir and Ghalib that their century has passed and "this century is ours", shares its refrain with the title of his collection Ye Sadi Hamari Hai; he has said reciting it won over his audience on his first visit to the United States in 1991.

His work frequently addresses social and political concerns. At a 2002 mushaira in Jeddah, Arab News reported, he recited couplets on the aftermath of the 2002 Gujarat riots and against the Prevention of Terrorism Act. His nazm "Mujhko Apne Bank Ki Kitab Dijiye" speaks for ordinary people, and a couplet urging parents to pray for daughters as well as sons is among his most quoted; his Hindi collection Betiyon Ke Liye ("For Daughters") is devoted to the theme. He has also written a song on the Ganges celebrating shared Hindu–Muslim culture, composed after a visit to the ghats of Varanasi with Bismillah Khan.

His satirical poem "Mujhko Apne Bank Ki Kitab Dijiye", which demands that the government account for its promises, was written in 1990 and first recited in Washington in 1991. It went viral on social media during the 2024 Indian general election campaign, after which he reported receiving threats urging him to have it taken down. In July 2026, reworked versions of the poem were sung by student protesters at Jantar Mantar in Delhi during demonstrations over the NEET paper leak, where it became an unofficial anthem of the movement.

=== Environmental work ===
Manzar Bhopali has planted trees for decades in Kalakhedi village, about 30 km from Bhopal; by 2017 he had planted about 5,000 saplings there, including species brought back from his travels abroad. He compiled couplets about trees by poets from some 60 countries into the anthology Saaye Mein Chale Aao, and planned to display 994 of them on plaques among the trees.

== Awards and honours ==
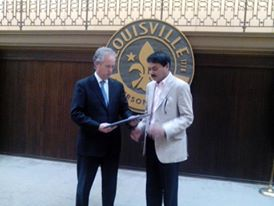
Receiving honorary citizenship from Mayor Greg Fischer in Louisville, Kentucky, 2014

On 16 September 2014, Mayor Greg Fischer of Louisville, Kentucky, made him an honorary citizen of the city and presented him with its symbolic key; the citation praised his contribution to Urdu poetry and his commitment to social justice. In 2018 the Government of Madhya Pradesh conferred on him its "Pride of Madhya Pradesh" award. In 2026 he received the Gopal Das Neeraj Award.

Other honours he has received include:

- Citation from the County Comptroller, Nassau County, New York
- Mehboob-e-Urdu Award, Santa Monica, US
- Honour from the Aligarh Alumni Association, Birmingham, Alabama, US
- Lifetime Achievement Award, Awam-e-Urdu, Orlando, US
- Honour from the Pakistan Association of Utah, US
- Rashtriya Ekta Award, Hindi Urdu Ekta Committee, Lucknow
- Sahitya Ratan, Geetanjali Organisation
- Shadan Indori Award, Madhya Pradesh Urdu Academy
- Savitri Foundation Sahitya Award, Lucknow
- Ittehad-e-Millat Nida Fazli Award, Lucknow
- Sheri Bhopali Award, Sheri Academy, Bhopal
- Ghazal Award, Bazm-e-Adab, Washington
- Bhim Ratna Award, Nagpur
- Honour from Geetanjali Organisation, London
- Faiz Ahmad Faiz Award, Oslo
- Nishan-e-Urdu, Sydney
- Honour from Gehwara-e-Adab, Atlanta, US
- Sahitya Saraswat, Hindi Sahitya Sammelan, Prayagraj
- Mirza Ghalib Award, New Delhi

== Works ==
- Ye Sadi Hamari Hai (1991, Urdu)
- Zindagi (Karachi, 1992)
- Lahu Rang Mausam (1994, Urdu)
- Manzar Ek Bulandi Par (2000, Urdu)
- Lava (2001, Urdu)
- Udas Kyun Ho (2006, India and Pakistan)
- Zamane Ke Liye (2011, Urdu, Hindi and English)
- Haasil (2012, Urdu)
- Tishnagi (2013, Urdu)
- Taveez (2016, Hindi)
- Betiyon Ke Liye (2016, Hindi)
- Saaye Mein Chale Aao (2016, editor; anthology of tree poetry)
- Aitbar-e-Adab (memoir)

== Personal life ==
Manzar Bhopali is married to Tabassum Manzar and lives in Bhopal.
