= Vimal Punjab Deshmukh =

Member of Parliament of India

Vimalabai Panjabrao Deshmukh

Member of Parliament
- In office 1965–1967
- Preceded by: Panjabrao Deshmukh
- Succeeded by: K G Deshmukh
- Constituency: Amravati

Personal details
- Born: 27 October 1906 Pune, India
- Died: 25 March 1998 (aged 91)
- Party: Indian National Congress
- Spouse: Panjabrao Deshmukh
- Profession: politician

Vimalabai Panjabrao Deshmukh (27 October 1906 – 25 March 1998) was an Indian politician in the state of Maharashtra who belonged to the INC party. She was the wife of Dr Panjabrao Deshmukh, India's first Cabinet Minister for Agriculture.

Vimalabai Deshmukh represented the Maharashtra state in the Rajya Sabha, the Council of States of India parliament from 1967 to 1972. She died on 25 March 1998, at the age of 91.
