= Global Press Institute =

American journalism organization

Global Press
- Formerly: Global Press Institute, Press Institute for Women in the Developing World
- Type: 501(c)(3) Non-Governmental Organization, Nonprofit Organization
- Industry: Journalism, Social Entrepreneurship, Women, Media
- Founded: 2006, United States
- Founder: Cristi Hegranes
- Headquarters: Washington DC, United States
- Area served: Argentina, Democratic Republic of Congo, Haiti, Mexico, Mongolia, Nepal, Puerto Rico, Sri Lanka, Uganda, Zambia, Zimbabwe
- Key people: Cristi Hegranes (CEO) | Laxmi Parthasarathy (COO)
- Website: www.globalpress.co

The Global Press Institute (Press Institute for Women in the Developing World) was a 501(c)(3) nonprofit organization that trained and employed women journalists to report news from under-reported regions. The organization was founded by Cristi Hegranes in 2006. Due to a collapse of philanthropic support, it shut down in 2025.

== Global reach ==
The Global Press Institute trained and employed local women to report regional news. As of 2022, the organization reported having trained and employed 250 journalists in 40 locations, including communities in Argentina, The Democratic Republic of Congo, Haiti, Mexico, Mongolia, Nepal, Puerto Rico, Sri Lanka, Uganda, The United States, Zambia and Zimbabwe.

== Funding and support ==
The Global Press Institute relied on individual and institutional donors. Its donors include the Ford Foundation, The MacArthur Foundation, and the Susie Tompkins Buell Foundation.

== Global Press Journal ==
The Global Press Journal was a multilingual news publication that features stories reported by women based in developing countries and covered a range of topics, including arts and culture, business, climate, community, economic justice, education, environment, gender justice, health, human rights, migration, and politics. The stories were published in both English and their local language.

== Controversies ==
In 2023, Semafor reported that GPJ exponentially inflated its audience numbers to funders and raised questions about the role of editors in writing GPJ stories and whether the organization's journalism training program had adequately equipped reporters for employment at any other media organization.

In 2024, a Columbia Journalism Review investigation reported that Global Press was laying off journalists and recalibrating its operations amid financial difficulties, raising questions about workplace conditions and whether GPJ reporters had been adequately trained for employment elsewhere.

== Awards ==
Global Press and its reporters received international awards and accolades including:

- 2022 Grand Stevie Award, Stevie Awards for Women in Business, awarded to Global Press Institute
- 2022 Community Award, Online News Association (ONA), awarded to Manori Wijesekera, Global Press training manager
- 2022 World Changing Ideas, Fast Company magazine, awarded to Global Press
- 2021 Emerson Collective Dial Fellowship, awarded to Cristi Hegranes
- 2021 Clarion Award for Online Journalism, Journalistic Excellence, awarded to GPJ reporter Shilu Manandhar, Global Press Nepal
- 2021 Webby Award, Best Practices on a Website, International Academy of Digital Arts and Sciences, awarded to Global Press Journal
- 2021 Gold Medal, International Annual Report Design Awards, awarded to Global Press
- 2021 MUSE Creative Award, International Awards Associate, awarded to Global Press Journal
- 2021 Print Award (longlist), One World Media, awarded to GPJ reporter Shilu Manandhar, Global Press Nepal
- 2021 Award of Excellence, Society for News Design, awarded to Global Press Journal
- 2021 Award of Excellence, The Communicator Awards, awarded to Global Press and Global Press Journal
- 2020 Media Hero of the Year, Stevie Awards for Women in Business, awarded to GPJ reporters
- 2020 Best News Website, Vega Awards, awarded to GPJ reporter Merveille Kavira Luneghe, Global Press DRC
- 2020 Clarion Award for Online Journalism, Association for Women in Communications, awarded to GPJ reporter Gamuchirai Masiyiwa, Global Press Zimbabwe
- 2020 Clarion Award for Online Journalism, Association for Women in Communications, awarded to GPJ reporter Merveille Kavira Luneghe, Global Press DRC
- 2020 Clarion Award for Special Print Communication, Association for Women in Communications, awarded to Global Press
- 2020 Chester M. Pierce Human Rights Award, American Psychiatric Association, awarded to Global Press
- 2020 Refugee Reporting Award (shortlist), One World Media, awarded to GPJ reporter Merveille Kavira Luneghe, Global Press DRC
- 2019 GLG Social Impact Fellowship, GLG, awarded to Cristi Hegranes
- 2019 Award of Excellence, Society for News Design, awarded to GPJ reporter Merveille Kavira Luneghe, Global Press DRC
- 2019 Best Places to Work, Inc. Magazine, awarded to Global Press
- 2019 Women-Run Workplace of the Year, Stevie Awards, awarded to Global Press
- 2018, Clarion Award for Online Journalism, Association for Women in Communications, awarded to GPJ senior reporters Kalpana Khanal, Shilu Manandhar, and Yam Kumari Kandel
- 2018 Media Professionalism Award, Voluntary Media Council of Zimbabwe, awarded to GPJ reporter Vimbai Chinembiri, Global Press Zimbabwe
- 2017 LACP Vision Awards, League of American Communications Professionals, awarded to Global Press
- 2017 Leadership Council, Classy, awarded to Cristi Hegranes
- 2017 Top 100 Most Innovative Organizations in the World, Classy Awards, awarded to Global Press
- 2017 WeWork Creator Awards, Scale Award, WeWork, awarded to Global Press Institute
- 2016 Best News Mobile Website, Mobile Web Awards, awarded to Global Press Journal
- 2016 Best Editorial Writing (Honoree), Webby Awards, awarded to Global Press Journal
- 2015 Persephone Miel Fellowship, Pulitzer Center for Crisis Reporting, awarded to GPJ reporter Yam Kandel, Global Press Nepal
- 2015 Persephone Miel Fellowship, Pulitzer Center for Crisis Reporting, awarded to GPJ reporter Shilu Manandhar, Global Press Nepal
- 2015, Persephone Miel Fellowship, Pulitzer Center for Crisis Reporting, awarded to GPJ reporter Wairimu Michengi, Global Press Kenya
- 2014, Boehm Media Fellowship, Opportunity Collaboration, awarded to Cristi Hegranes
- 2013 Ulrich Wickert Award for Child Rights, awarded to Gloriose Isugi and Noella Nbihogo, Rwanda News Desk
- 2012 Excellence in Epilepsy Reporting, the International Bureau of Epilepsy, awarded to GPJ reporter Comfort Mussa, Cameroon News Desk
- 2011 Elizabeth Neuffer Fellowship, International Women's Media Foundation, awarded to GPJ reporter Jackee Batanda, Uganda News Desk
- 2011 Kurt Schork Award, Excellence in International Journalism, Reuters, awarded to GPJ reporter Gertrude Pswarayi, Zimbabwe News Desk
- 2011 Kurt Schork Award, Excellence in International Journalism Shortlist, Reuters, awarded to GPJ senior reporter Tara Bhattarai, Nepal News Desk
- 2010 Journalism Innovation Prize, Society of Professional Journalists, awarded to Global Press Institute
- 2008 One of the 21 Leaders of the 21st Century, Women's ENews, awarded to Cristi Hegranes
- 2008 Ida B. Wells Award for Bravery in Journalism, Women's ENews, awarded to Cristi Hegranes

== See also ==
- Institute for Nonprofit News
