= Generic Product Identifier =

Classification system to identify drugs

The Generic Product Identifier (GPI) is a 14-character hierarchical classification system created by Wolters Kluwer's MediSpan that identifies drugs from their primary therapeutic use down to the unique interchangeable product, regardless of manufacturer or package size. The code consists of seven subsets, each providing increasingly more specific information about a drug available with a prescription in the United States. The GPI is created and maintained by UpToDate, Inc, a Wolters Kluwer company.

The GPI defines Drug Group, Drug Class, Drug Subclass, Drug Base Name, Drug Name, Dose Form, and GPI Name in a codified manner. The first six characters of the GPI define the therapeutic class code, the next two pairs the drug name, and the last four define route, dosage or strength. For example GPI 58-20-00-60-10-01-05 is for the drug nortriptyline HCl cap 10 mg (an antidepressant) and can be further classified as follows:

GPI	Coding	Example
58	Drug group	Antidepressants
58-20	Drug class	Tricyclic agents
58-20-00	Drug sub-class	—
58-20-00-60	Drug name	Nortriptyline
58-20-00-60-10	Drug name extension	Hydrochloride
58-20-00-60-10-01	Dosage form	Capsule
58-20-00-60-10-01-05	Strength	10 mg

Alternate drug classification systems include the AHFS Drug Information brand run by the American Society of Health-System Pharmacists and First DataBank's Generic Sequence Number (GSN) also known as the Clinical Formulation ID or formerly as Generic Code Number Sequence Number (GCN Seq No).

Wolters Kluwer provides a database under their Medi-Span brand called Medi-Span Electronic Drug File v2.5 that provides this therapeutic classification system which can be mapped to other prescription drug classification codes commonly used for payment and analysis in the United States Health Care System. This classification system is used in conjunction with other embedded drug information like adverse drug effects, drug interactions, drug dosing, and more.
