= Government Polytechnic Amravati =

Institute in Maharashtra, India

Government Polytechnic Amravati (GPA)
- Type: Education and Research Institution
- Established: 1955
- Principal: Prof.A.B.Borade
- Location: Gadge Nagar, Amravati, Maharashtra, India
- Acronym: GPA
- Website: http://www.gpamravati.ac.in/

Government Polytechnic, Amravati is an autonomous engineering college located in the city of Vidarbha, Amravati and is one of the oldest academic institutes in the Indian state of Maharashtra, having been established in 1955. The institute is approved by All India Council for Technical Education (AICTE), New Delhi & Government of Maharashtra has awarded an academic autonomy to the institute since 1995.

It offers various courses like Civil Engineering, Mechanical Engineering, Electrical Engineering, Computer Engineering, Information Technology, Electronics & Telecommunication Engineering, Plastic and Polymer Engineering and Chemical Engineering.

| Sr.No. | Name of Programme | Duration | Intake Capacity |
|---|---|---|---|
| 1 | Civil Engineering | 3 Year | 120 |
| 2 | Mechanical Engineering | 3 Year | 120 |
| 3 | Electrical Engineering | 3 Year | 60 |
| 4 | Computer Engineering | 3 Year | 60 |
| 5 | Information & Technology | 3 Year | 60 |
| 6 | Electronics & Telecommunication | 3 Year | 120 |
| 7 | Plastic & Polymer Engineering | 3 Year | 30 |
| 8 | Chemical Engineering | 3 Year | 30 |
