= Amravati Municipal Corporation =

Local civic body in Amravati, Maharashtra, India

Type
- Type: Municipal Corporation of the Amravati

History
- Founded: 15 August 1983; 42 years ago

Leadership
- Mayor: Shrichand Tejwani, BJP
- Municipal Commissioner & Administrator: Saumya Sharma (Chandak), (IAS)
- Deputy Mayor: Sachin Bhende, RYSP

Structure
- Seats: 87
- Political groups: Government (54): BJP (25); RYSP (15); NCP (11); SHS (3); Opposition (33): INC (15); AIMIM (12); BSP (3); SS(UBT) (2); VBA (1)
- Length of term: 5 years

Elections
- Voting system: First-past-the-post voting
- Last election: 15 January 2026
- Next election: 2031

Motto
- योगः कर्मसु कौशलम (Sanskrit)

Website
- amravaticorporation.in

Amravati Municipal Corporation is the governing body of the city of Amravati in the Indian state of Maharashtra. The municipal corporation consists of democratically elected members, is headed by a mayor and administers the city's infrastructure, public services and police. Members from the state's leading various political parties hold elected offices in the corporation. Municipal Corporation mechanism in India was introduced during British Rule with formation of municipal corporation in Madras (Chennai) in 1688, later followed by municipal corporations in Bombay (Mumbai) and Calcutta (Kolkata) by 1762. Amravati Municipal Corporation is headed by Mayor of city and governed by Commissioner.

Amravati municipal corporation is located in Amravati City. Amravati Municipal Corporation has been formed with functions to improve the infrastructure of town.

== Administration ==
The Amravati Municipal Corporation (AMC) is headed by an Indian Administrative Service (IAS) officer who serves as the Municipal commissioner. The Municipal commissioner has executive power and is responsible for the day-to-day administration of the AMC. Every five years, there is an election to select Corporator, who have the responsibility of managing fundamental civic infrastructure and enforcing their duties. The Mayor, who is usually from the majority party, serves as the head of the AMC.

City officials, as of March 2023
Mayor	Shrichand Tejwani	6 February 2026
Deputy Mayor	Sachin Bhende	6 February 2026
Municipal Commissioner	Saumya Sharma (Chandak)	18 June 2025
Administrator	Saumya Sharma (Chandak)	18 June 2025
Commissioner of police	Arvind Chawaria	20 may 2025

== Revenue sources ==
The following are the Income sources for the corporation from the Central and State Government.

=== Revenue from Taxes ===
Following is the Tax related revenue for the corporation-

- Property Tax
- Profession Tax
- Entertainment Tax
- Grants from Central and State Government like Goods and Services Tax
- Advertisement Tax

=== Revenue from non-tax sources ===
Following is the Non Tax related revenue for the corporation.

- Water usage charges.
- Fees from Documentation services.
- Rent received from municipal property.
- Funds from municipal bonds.

== Corporation Election 2017 ==
=== Political Performance in Election 2017 ===
Amravati Municipal Corporation elections were conducted in February 2017.

S.No.	Party name	Party flag or symbol	Number of Corporators
01	Bhartiya Janata Party (BJP)		45
02	Indian National Congress (INC)		15
03	All India Majlis-e-Ittehadul Muslimeen		10
04	Shiv Sena (SS)		07
05	Bahujan Samaj Party (BSP)		05
06	Yuva Swabhiman Party (YSP)		03
07	Republican Party of India (Athavale)		01
08	Independents		01

== Corporation Election 2012 ==
=== Political Performance in Election 2012 ===
Amravati Municipal Corporation elections were conducted in February 2012.

S.No.	Party name	Party flag or symbol	Number of Corporators
01	Indian National Congress (INC)		25
02	Bharatiya Janata Party (BJP)		07
03	Bahujan Samaj Party (BSP)		06
04	Nationalist Congress Party (NCP)		17
05	Shiv Sena (SS)		10
06	Janvikas Congress		06
07	Jankalyan Aghadi		01
08	Republican Party of India (Gavai)		01
09	Republican Party of India (Athavale)		02
10	Indian Union Muslim League (IUML)	IUML Election Symbol	02
11	Samajwadi Party (SP)		01
12	Maharashtra Swabhiman Paksha		01
13	Independents		08

Ward.No.	Ward Name	Name of Corporators
01	Shegaon	Pravin Meshram, Archana Ingole
02	Tapovan	Raju Mankar, Swati Nistane
03	Jawahar Stadium	Raju Masram, Sujata Zade
04	Sant Gadgebaba	Balu Bhuyar, Sarika Mahalle
05	Rampuri Camp	Bhushan Bansod, Sheeladevi Bajaj
06	Vidarbha Mahavidyalaya	Dhiraj Hiwase, Divya Sisode
07	Navsari	Pradip Bajad, Nileema Kale
08	Jamil Colony	Mohd Imran Mohd Yakub, Hamidabano Afzal
09	Mahendra Colony	Yojna Revaskar, Lubna Tanvir Nawab
10	Vilas Nagar	Pradip Dhande, Rekha Tayade
11	Morbag	Suganchand Gupta, Kusum Sahu
12	Ambapeth	Dinesh Bub, Hemlata Sahu
13	Maltekdi	Sanjay Agrawal, Vandana Kangale
14	SRPF	Nitinraj (Bablu) T. Shekhawat, Malti Dabade
15	Wadali	Vijay Babulkar, Sapna Thakur
16	Chaprasipura Bichutekdi	Ambadas Javare, Shahista Ansari Jishan Ansari
17	Congressnagar Frezarpura	Arun Jaiswal, Alka Sardar
18	Rukhmini Nagar	Nitin Deshmukh, Nutan Bujade
19	Swami Vivekanand	Pradip Hiwase, Asha Nindhane
20	Ambika Nagar	Chetan Pawar, Jayshree Morya
21	Rajapeth	Prashant Wankhede, Savita Ladekar
22	Sharda Nagar	Nandakishor Varhade, Suvarna Raut
23	Gaurakshan	Milind Bambal, Kanchan Dendule
24	Budhwara	Vilas Ingole, Sunita Bhele
25	Jawahar Gate	Pravin Haramkar, Kanchan Upadhyay, Archana Rajgure
26	Gawalipura	Shekh Hamid Shada, Bilkis Bano Hamza Khan
27	Pathanpura	Nurkha Maujdar Kha, Rahimabi Rafiq
28	Mehadiya Colony	Shaikh Jafar Shaikh Jabbar, Hafisabi Yusufshah
29	Aleem Nagar	Mohd. Asif Mohd. Haroon, Tamijabi Ahamdakha
30	Rehamat Nagar	Abdul Rafiq Abdul Razak, Fahemida Narsin Habibshah
31	Gadgeshwar	Bharat Chavhan, Sangita Wagh
32	Nawathe Plot	Digambar Dahake, Vanita Tayade
33	Dastur Nagar	Rajendra Mahalle, Anjali Pande
34	Kiran Nagar	Deepak Patil, Nirmala Borkar
35	Wadarpura	Ajay Gondane, Deepmala Mohod
36	Benoda Bhimtekdi	Gaurav khond, Mamata Aware
37	Jevad Nagar	Rajendra Tayade, Vandana Harne
38	Akoli Sainagar	Tushar Bharatiya, Manjusha Jadhav
39	Nemani Godown	Sunil Kale, Charanjitkaur Nanda
40	Almas Nagar	Javed Memon, Chaya Ambadkar
41	Baripura	Vijay Nagpure, Jayshree More
42	Somwar Bazar	Chandumal Bidlani, Kanchan Grespunje
43	Ziri	Prakash Bansod, Gufa Mahadev Meshram

== Nominated corporators (2012-2017) ==
A total of 5 corporators were nominated based on the strength of the parties in the corporation after the 2012 elections. These 5 corporators are as follows :-

- Indian National Congress (2) - Vasantrao Saulkar, Amol Thakre
- Nationalist Congress Party (1) - Asif Hussain Muzzafar Hussain
- Shiv Sena (1) - Komal Bothra
- Bharatiya Janata Party (1) - Ajay Samadekar

== Corporation Election 2007 ==
S.No.	Party name	Party flag or symbol	Number of Corporators
01	Indian National Congress (INC)		21
02	Bharatiya Janata Party (BJP)		15
03	Nationalist Congress Party (NCP)		18
04	Shiv Sena (SS)		10
05	Bahujan Samaj Party (BSP)		04
06	Indian Union Muslim League (IUML)	IUML Election Symbol	01
