= Waman Gopal Joshi =

Marathi journalist

- Born: 18 March 1881
- Died: 3 June 1956 (aged 75)
- Other names: Veer Wamanrao Joshi, Dada Joshi
- Known for: Indian Independence Movement

Waman Gopal Joshi (18 March 1881 – 3 June 1956), popularly known as Veer Wamanrao Joshi, was a Marathi journalist, playwright, and freedom fighter, from Amravati Maharashtra, India.

== Early life ==
He was the editor of Rashtramat and Swatantra Hindustan during the freedom struggle of India. He courted arrest and came to be known as Veer Wamanrao Joshi or Veer Vamanrao Joshi. He wrote the play 'RaNa-dundubhi', whose songs were made famous by Deenanath Mangeshkar.

Waman Gopal Joshi should not be confused with the writer Vaman Malhar Joshi. They were contemporaries.

He was also involved in Satyagraha and kayde bhang movement in Hyderabad free movement.

== Literary work ==
- Rakshasi Mahattvakanksha (1914)
- Ranadundubhi (1927)
