= Amravati =

City in Maharashtra, India

- City
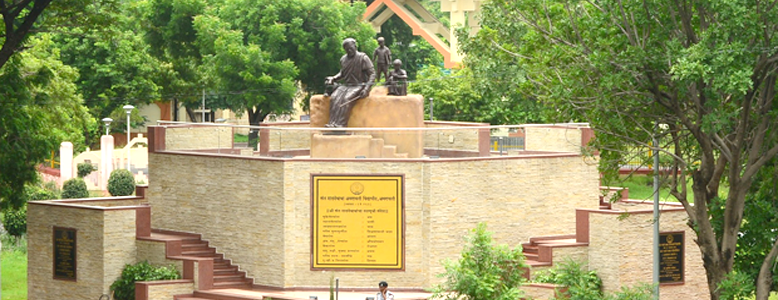
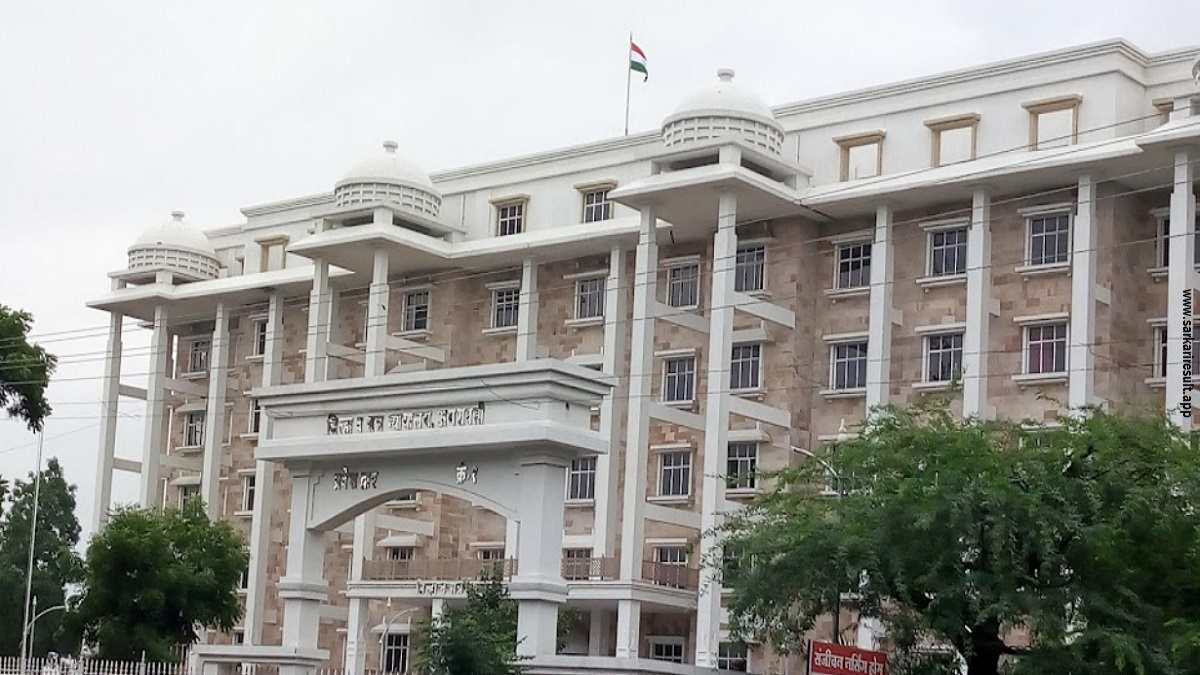
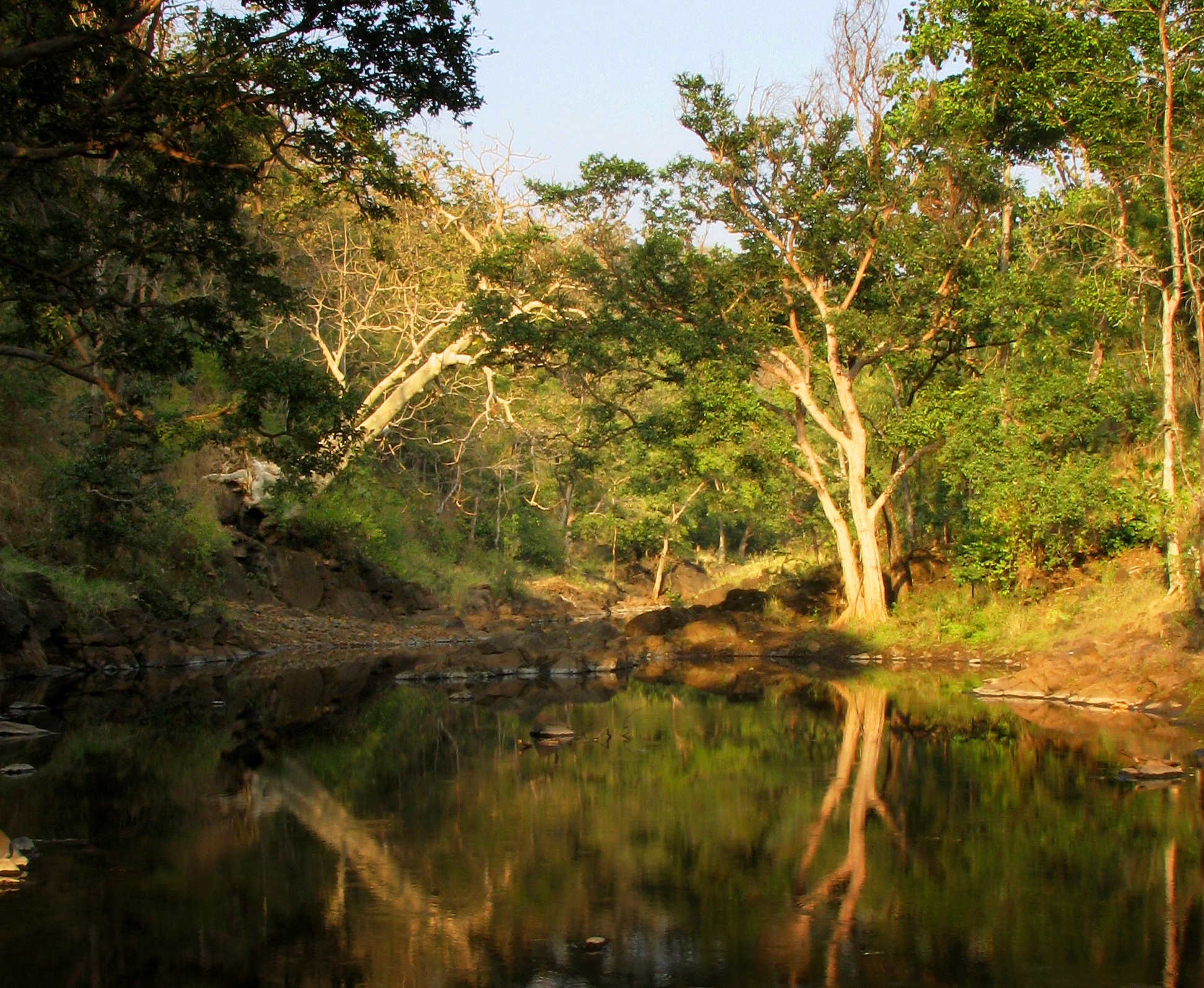
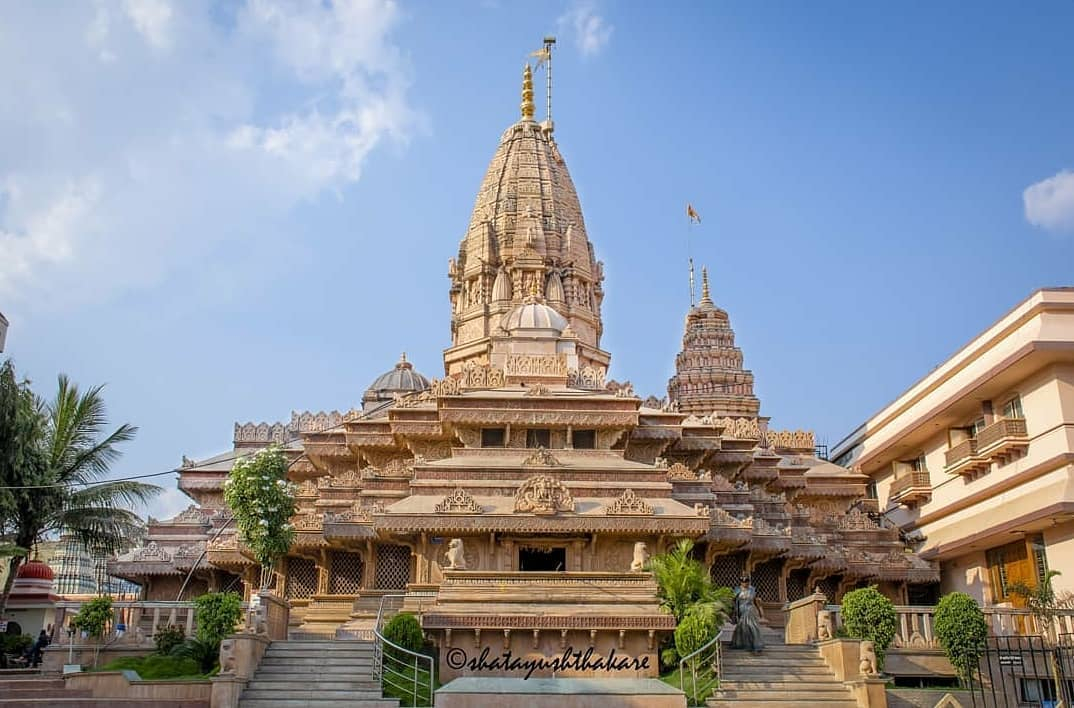
- Amravati Bridge, Amravati University, Amravati Court, Melghat Lake, Melghat tiger reserve, Ekvira Temple, Board Office Amravati, Melghat Tiger
- Nickname: Amba Nagari
- Interactive map of Amravati
- Coordinates: 20°55′33″N 77°45′53″E
- Country: India
- State: Maharashtra
- District: Amravati
- Established: 1097 AD

Government
  - Type: Municipal Corporation
  - Body: Amravati Municipal Corporation
  - Municipal Commissioner: Devidas Pawar

Area
  - Total: 121.65 km^{2} (46.97 sq mi)
  - Rank: 2nd in Vidharbha
- Elevation: 343 m (1,125 ft)

Population (2011)
  - Total: 646,801
  - Rank: India: 70th Maharashtra: 14th Vidarbha: 2nd
  - Density: 3,524/km^{2} (9,130/sq mi)
- Demonym: Amravatikar

Languages
  - Official: Marathi
- Time zone: UTC+5:30 (IST)
- PIN: 444 601 - 444 608, 444701, 444901
- Telephone code: +91-721
- Vehicle registration: MH-27
- Distance from Nagpur: 152 kilometres (94 mi) (land)
- Distance from Mumbai: 663 kilometres (412 mi) (land)
- Literacy Rate: 93.03%
- HDI: Medium
- Website: amravati.gov.in

Amravati is a city in Maharashtra located in the Vidarbha region. It is the ninth largest city in Maharashtra, India & second largest city in the Vidarbha region in terms of population. It is the administrative headquarter of Amravati district as well as Amravati Division which includes Amravati District, Akola District, Buldhana District, Washim District & Yavatmal District. It is one of Maharashtra's nominated cities under Smart Cities Mission.

== Etymology ==
The ancient name of Amravati is "Udumbravati", prākrut form of this is "Umbravati" and "Amravati" is known for many centuries with this name.Amravati is the incorrect pronunciation of this, and as a result, it now goes by that name. Amravati is claimed to have gotten its name from the city's historic Ambadevi temple.

== History ==
Evidence of human settlement in Amravati in the 11th century comes from the marble statue of the Jain tirthankara Rishabhanatha. According to an inscription on its base, this statue was installed in 1097. When Govind Maha Prabhu visited Amravati in the 13th century, the region surrounding Amaravati was ruled by the Hindu King of Devagiree (Yadav). Famine (drought) struck Amravati in the fourteenth century, and residents fled to Gujarat and Malwa. After several years, the locals were brought back to Amravati, where the population was sparse. Mager Aurangpura, now known as "Sabanpura", was given to Jamia Masjid by Aurangzeb in the sixteenth century. This demonstrates that Muslims and Hindus coexist in this area. When Amravati became Bhosle ki Amravati in 1722, Chhatrapati Shahu Maharaj gave Amrāvati and Badnera to Shri Ranoji Bhosle. The city was reconstructed and prospered by Ranoji Bhosle after the treaty of Devgaon and Anjangaon Surji and victory over Gavilgad (Fort of Chikhaldara).

The Amravati residents still refer to the location where the British general Colonel Wellesley camped as a camp. After the 18th century, the city of Amravati was founded. Amravati was governed by the Nizam and Bosale Union states. Although the revenue officer was appointed, the defence system suffered. British forces took control of Gavilgad Fort on 15 December 1803. According to the Deogaon pact, Nizam received the Warhād as a sign of friendship. Pindāri invaded Amravati city around 1805.

In 1983, Amravati became Vidarbha's second Municipal corporation. Located about 663 (412 mi) kilometres east of the state capital Mumbai and 152 (94 mi) kilometres west of Nagpur, Amravati is the second largest city of the Vidarbha region after Nagpur.

== Geography ==
Amravati is located at 20.93°N 77.75°E. It has an average elevation of 343 meters (1125 feet). It lies 156 km (97 mi) west of Nagpur and serves as the administrative centre of Amravati District and of Amravati Division. The city is located near the passes through the hills that separate the cotton-growing regions of the Purna basin to the West and the Wardha basin to the East. Chikhaldara is about 80 km from Amravati city which is the only hill station in the Vidarbha region. The land area of the city is around 50.5 km^{2} (19.5 sq mi).

=== Climate ===
Amravati has a tropical wet and dry climate with hot, dry summers and mild to cool winters. Summer lasts from March to June, the monsoon season from July to October, and winter from November to March.

The highest and lowest temperatures ever recorded were 49.1 °C on 25 May 2013 and 5.0 °C on 9 February 1887 respectively.

Climate data for Amravati (1991–2020, extremes 1901–2020)
Month	Jan	Feb	Mar	Apr	May	Jun	Jul	Aug	Sep	Oct	Nov	Dec	Year
Record high °C (°F)	34.6 (94.3)	38.9 (102.0)	43.9 (111.0)	46.8 (116.2)	48.3 (118.9)	46.7 (116.1)	40.2 (104.4)	40.5 (104.9)	38.9 (102.0)	42.6 (108.7)	37.4 (99.3)	35.6 (96.1)	48.3 (118.9)
Mean daily maximum °C (°F)	29.0 (84.2)	31.8 (89.2)	36.2 (97.2)	40.0 (104.0)	41.6 (106.9)	35.7 (96.3)	30.4 (86.7)	29.1 (84.4)	30.8 (87.4)	32.5 (90.5)	30.8 (87.4)	28.8 (83.8)	32.9 (91.2)
Mean daily minimum °C (°F)	14.2 (57.6)	16.4 (61.5)	20.0 (68.0)	23.3 (73.9)	25.2 (77.4)	23.3 (73.9)	21.8 (71.2)	21.4 (70.5)	21.3 (70.3)	19.7 (67.5)	16.8 (62.2)	14.1 (57.4)	19.7 (67.5)
Record low °C (°F)	6.1 (43.0)	5.0 (41.0)	8.9 (48.0)	12.8 (55.0)	17.0 (62.6)	17.0 (62.6)	16.8 (62.2)	15.6 (60.1)	16.8 (62.2)	12.0 (53.6)	8.9 (48.0)	7.8 (46.0)	5.0 (41.0)
Average rainfall mm (inches)	6.1 (0.24)	5.0 (0.20)	18.5 (0.73)	7.1 (0.28)	6.0 (0.24)	137.5 (5.41)	205.6 (8.09)	179.1 (7.05)	138.9 (5.47)	47.5 (1.87)	11.3 (0.44)	0.5 (0.02)	763.1 (30.04)
Average rainy days	0.4	0.2	1.1	0.7	0.9	5.4	11.2	11.0	7.3	2.5	0.6	0.1	41.4
Average relative humidity (%) (at 17:30 IST)	51	47	40	33	31	53	74	79	72	59	63	61	55
Source 1: India Meteorological Department
Source 2: Government of Maharashtra

Amravati has been ranked 2nd best “National Clean Air City” under (Category 2 3-10L Population cities) in India according to 'Swachh Vayu Survekshan 2024 Results'

== Demographics ==
The population of Amravati City in 2011 was 646,801; of which males and females were 330,544 and 316,257 respectively. The sex ratio of Amravati city is 957 per 1000 males. The population in the age range of 0–6 years was 62,497. The effective literacy rate (population over 7 years of age) was 93.03%.

=== Religion ===
Hinduism is the major religion in Amravati with 61.8% followers, with Islam having 23.7% and Buddhism having 12.8% followers.

Year	Male	Female	Total Population	Change
2001	284247	265263	549510	-
2011	329992	317065	647057	17.752

Religion in Amravati City (2011)
Religion	Percent
Hinduism	61.83%
Islam	23.73%
Buddhism	12.87%
Jainism	0.88%
Other or not stated	0.69%

Languages in Amravati (2011)
1. Marathi (60.3%)
2. Urdu (20.3%)
3. Hindi (12.2%)
4. Sindhi (3.26%)
5. Marwari (1.56%)
6. Others (2.45%)

Marathi is the most spoken language in the city. Urdu is the second-largest language, spoken by Muslims. Hindi and Marwari are spoken by nearly 15% of the population and Sindhi is spoken by 3% of the population.

== Government and politics ==
Amravati Municipal Corporation is the local authority in the city. It is headed by a mayor who is assisted by a deputy mayor elected for a tenure of three years. It was established on 15 August 1983. The area governed by the Municipal Corporation at that time was 121.65 km^{2} comprising the erstwhile Municipal Councils of Amravati and Badnera along with eighteen revenue villages.

== Transport ==
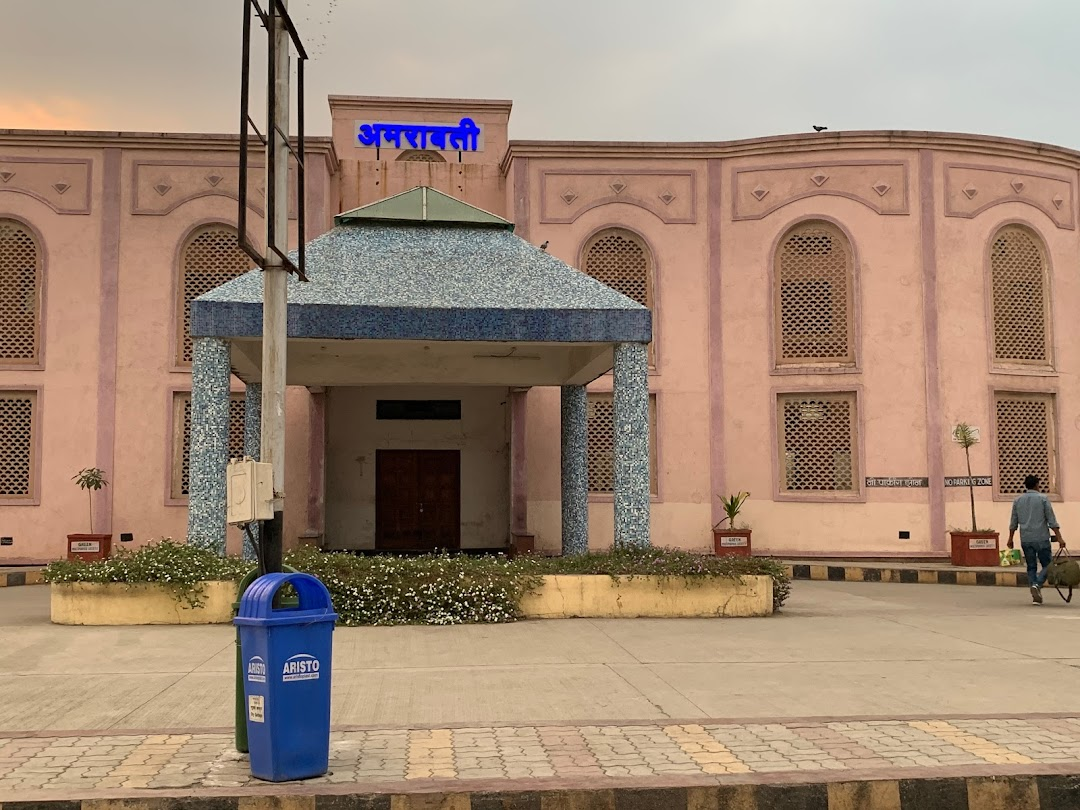
Amravati Railway Station

=== Road ===
The star city bus services are run by the Amravati Municipal Corporation. Private auto rickshaws and cycle rickshaws are also popular. Amravati has also started a Women's Special City bus which is a first in the Vidarbha region.

The Maharashtra State Road Transport Corporation (MSRTC) provides transport services for intercity and interstate travel. Many private operators also ply on the highly travelled Amravati – Pune and Amravati – Indore routes. Bus services to cities like Nagpur, Yavatmal, Bhopal, Harda, Indore, Raipur, Jabalpur, Mumbai, Pune, Akola, Dharni, Nanded, Aurangabad, Jalna, Burhanpur, Parbhani, Solapur, Khandwa, Gondia, Shirdi, Hyderabad, Paratwada (Achalpur) and Kolhapur are also available.

National Highway 6 (old numbering), which runs from Hazira (Surat) to Kolkata, passes through Amravati.

New Star City Buses are launched in the city replacing the old city buses.

=== Railway ===
Amravati has three railway stations:

- Amravati railway station, situated in the heart of the city is a terminus. The railway line could not be extended beyond it. Therefore, a new station was constructed outside the city when a new railway line was laid to connect Badnera junction to Narkhed on the Nagpur-Itarsi main railway line. Amravati railway station is situated on the branch line from Badnera on Nagpur-Bhusawal section of Howrah-Nagpur-Mumbai line of Central Railways.
- New Amravati railway station building was inaugurated on 10 December 2011. Amravati railway station provides multiple shuttle services to Badnera throughout the day.
- Badnera Junction railway station serves the area of Badnera in Amravati. It is a junction station on the Howrah-Nagpur-Mumbai line. There is a broad gauge line to Narkhed.
  - Located around 10 km from Amravati, Badnera is an important railway junction that connects Amravati with several key locations. Many trains originating from or passing through Badnera connect to major cities.

=== Airport ===
Amravati Airport, located at Bellora, 15 kilometres from NH-6 towards Yavatmal, is operated by the Maharashtra Airport Development Company (MADC). It is currently served by Alliance Air, which operates three flights per week on Mondays, Wednesdays, and Fridays to Mumbai. The Nagpur Flying Club has applied to DGCA for permission to shift its flying operations to Amravati airport. It also has a helipad facility. MADC is acquiring about 400 Hectares of land for developing the airport and related facilities at an estimated cost of Rs. 2.25 billion.

== Education ==
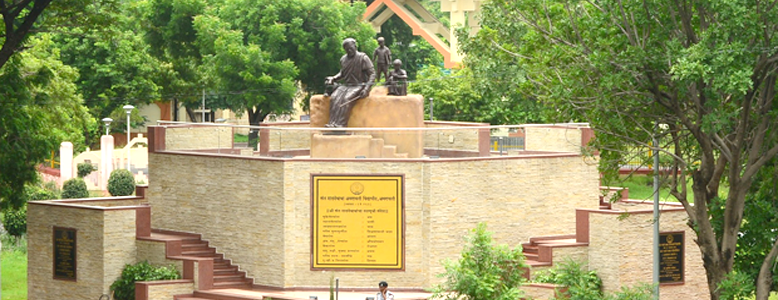
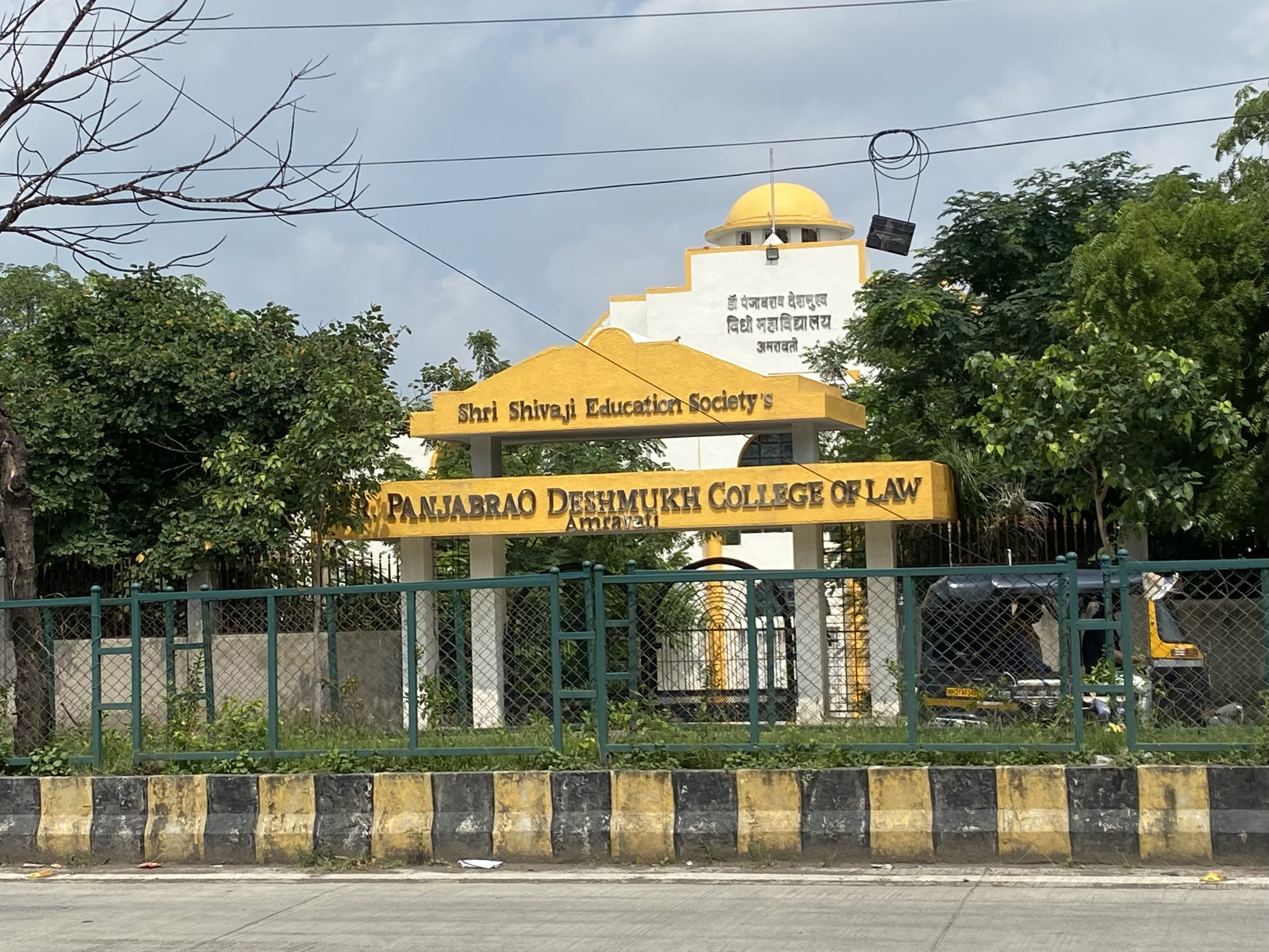
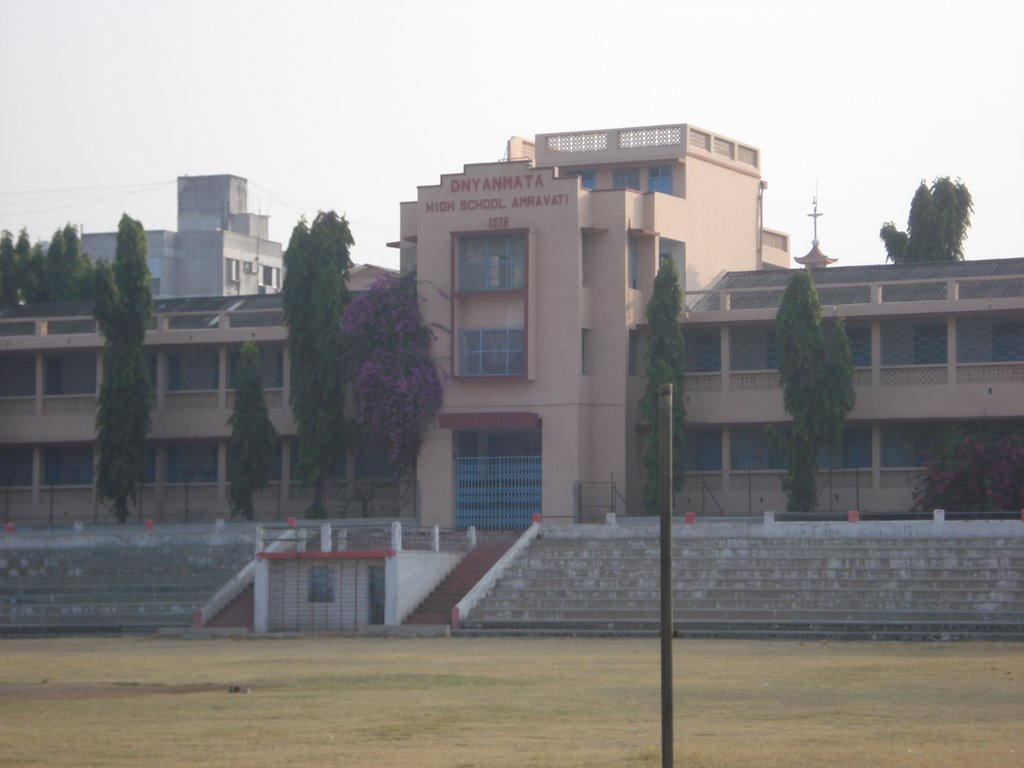
Amravati University, Law College, Dnyanmata High School
- Dr. Panjabrao Deshmukh Memorial Medical College
- Dr. Punjabrao Deshmukh Polytechnic College
- Government College of Engineering, Amravati
- Government Polytechnic Amravati
- Hanuman Vyayam Prasarak Mandal
- Hanuman Vyayam Prasarak Mandal's College of Engineering and Technology
- P. R. Patil Group of Educational Institutes
- Sant Gadge Baba Amravati University
- Shivaji Education Society

== Sports ==
=== Territorial Army Parade Ground ===
Territorial Army Parade Ground is a multi-purpose stadium in the city, formerly known as the Reforms Club Ground. 1958 First recorded Cricket match was held in 1958. The ground is owned and managed by the Territorial Army, a part-time branch of the Indian Army. The ground is mainly used for organising football and cricket matches and other sports.
The stadium hosted one Ranji Trophy match in 1976 when the Vidarbha cricket team played against the Rajasthan cricket team.

=== Hanuman Vyayam Prasarak Mandal Ground ===
In Hanuman Vyayam Prasarak Mandal a cricket ground is present that held a single first-class match when Vidarbha cricket team played Rajasthan cricket team in the 1980/81 Ranji Trophy, which resulted in a Rajasthan victory by 7 wickets.

== Media ==
Several daily newspapers are published from Amravati or produce local editions for the city. Dainik Hindusthan, a Marathi-language daily based in Amravati, was founded by Balkrishna Vishnu Marathe, also known as Balasaheb Marathe; it marked its 75th anniversary in 2024 with celebrations inaugurated by Union minister Nitin Gadkari. The Marathi dailies Lokmat and Deshonnati and the Hindi daily Dainik Bhaskar publish Amravati editions.

== Notable people ==
- Asif Basra
- Suresh Bhat
- Manzar Bhopali
- Mohan Choti
- Bhagwan Dada
- Pranawachandra Deshmukh
- Punjabrao Deshmukh
- Sunil Deshmukh
- Bharat Ganeshpure
- Bhushan Ramkrishna Gavai
- Tanveer Ghazi
- Gajanan Jagirdar
- Moropant Vishvanath Joshi
- Waman Gopal Joshi
- Gadge Maharaj
- Tukdoji Maharaj
- Vikas Mahatme
- Pratibha Patil
- Jitesh Sharma
- Shripad Balwant Tambe
- Shiv Thakare
- Prabhakar Vaidya

== See also ==
- Make in Maharashtra
- Amravati division
- List of districts of Maharashtra
