= Pilaf =

Rice dish in which grains do not stick

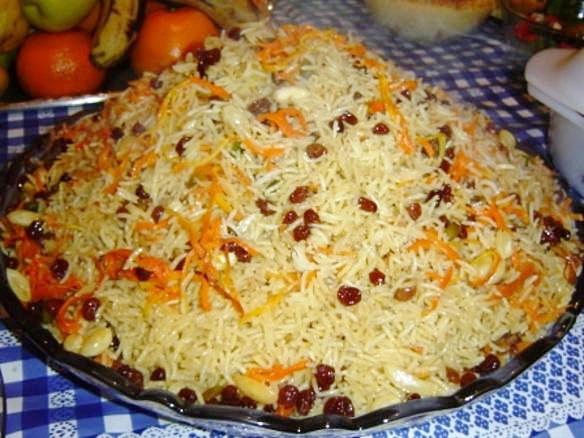
- Kabuli palaw, a variety of pilaf made in Afghanistan
- Alternative names: Polao, pulao, plao, pela, pilav, pilov, pallao, pilau, pelau, palau, polau, pulaav, palaw, palavu, plovas, palov, polov, polo, polu, kurysh, fulao, fulaaw, osh, aş, paloo, piles, kürüch
- Course: Main
- Place of origin: West Asia and South Asia
- Region or state: Central Asia, West Asia, South Asia, South Caucasus, Maritime Southeast Asia, East Africa, Balkans
- Serving temperature: Hot
- Main ingredients: Rice, stock or broth, spices, meat, vegetables, dried fruits

Pilaf (US: /ˈpiːlɑːf/ or pilau UK: /ˈpiːlaʊ, piːˈlaʊ/) (Note: see #Etymology for other terms) is a rice dish, or in some regions, a wheat dish, whose recipe usually involves cooking in stock or broth, adding spices, and other ingredients such as vegetables and meat, (Note: Oxford English Dictionary Online Edition (subscription required): pilaf (n) = pilau n.1; pilau n.1 = "A dish, partly of Middle Eastern, partly and ultimately of South Asian origin, consisting of rice (or, in certain areas, wheat) cooked in stock with spices, usually mixed with meat and various other ingredients.) (Note: Merriam-Webster Unabridged Dictionary (subscription required): "rice usually combined with meat and vegetables, fried in oil, steamed in stock, and seasoned with any of numerous herbs (as saffron or cumin).") and employing some technique for achieving cooked grains that do not adhere. (Note: Perry: "A Middle-Eastern method of cooking rice so that every grain remains separate. ...However, there is no evidence that rice was cooked by this technique in India before the Muslim invasions, and Indians themselves associate pilaf-making with Muslim cities such as Hyderabad, Lucknow, and Delhi. .... The first descriptions of the pilaf technique appear in the 13th-century Arabic books Kitab al-Tabikh and Kitab al-Witsla ila al Habib, written in Baghdad and Syria, respectively. They show the technique in its entirety, including the cloth beneath the lid, and describe still-current flavourings such as meat, pulses, and fruit.) (Note: Roger: "As noted, Iranians have a unique method of preparing rice. This method is designed to leave the grains separate and tasty, making the rice fluffy and very flavorful. After soaking, parboiling, and draining, the rice is poured into a dish smeared with melted butter. The lid is then sealed tightly with a cloth and a paste of flour and water. The last stage is to steam it on low heat for about half an hour, after which the rice is removed and fluffed.")

During the Abbasid Caliphate, such methods of cooking rice first spread across a vast territory from South Asia to Spain, and eventually to a wider world. The Spanish paella, (Note: Roger: " (p. 1143) Under the Abbasids, for example (ninth to twelfth century), during the Golden Age of Islam, there was one single empire from Afghanistan to Spain and the North of Arabia. The size of the empire allowed many foods to spread throughout the Middle East. From India, rice went to Syria, Iraq, and Iran, and eventually, it became known and cultivated all the way to Spain. .... Many dishes of that period are still prepared today with ingredients available to the common people. Some of these are vinegar preserves, roasted meat, and cooked livers, which could be bought in the streets, eaten in the shops, or taken home. Such dishes considerably influenced medieval European and Indian cookery; pilaf and meat patties that started out as samosa or sambusak.") and the South Asian pilau or pulao, (Note: Nandy: "(p. 11) Not merely ingredients came to the subcontinent, but also recipes. ... All around India one finds preparations that came originally from outside South Asia. Kebabs came from West and Central Asia and underwent radical metamorphosis in the hot and dusty plains of India. So did biryani and pulao, two rice preparations, usually with meat. Without them, ceremonial dining in many parts of India, Pakistan, and Bangladesh is incomplete. Even the term pulao or pilav seems to have come from Arabic and Persian. It is true that in Sanskrit — in the Yajnavalkya Smriti — and in old Tamil, the term pulao occurs (Achaya, 1998b: 11), but it is also true that biryani and pulao today carry mainly the stamp of the Mughal times and its Persianized high culture.") and biryani, (Note: Sengupta: "(p. 74) Muslim influence on the style and substance of Indian food was profound. K.T. Achaya writes that the Muslims imported a new refinement and a courtly etiquette of both group and individual dining into the austere dining ambiance of Hindu society. ... Babur's son, Humayun, came back to India after spending a long period of exile in Kabul and the Safavid imperial court in Iran. He brought with him an entourage of Persian cooks who introduced the rich and elaborate rice cookery of the Safavid courts to India, combining Indian spices and Persian arts into a rich fusion that became the iconic dish of Islamic South Asian cuisine, the biryani.") evolved from such dishes.

Pilaf and similar dishes are common to Middle Eastern, West Asian, Balkan, Caribbean, South Caucasian, Central Asian, East African, Eastern European, Latin American, Maritime Southeast Asia, and South Asian cuisines; in these areas, they are regarded as staple dishes.

== Etymology ==
Oxford English Dictionary Online Edition's summary, the English word pilaf, which the OED refers to the version with spelling "pilau," is a borrowing from Persian by way of Turkish. In more detail, the English pilau, of first use 1609 CE, has come from Persian pulaw (16th cent. as palāv), in turn from Hindi pulāv dish of rice and meat, from Sanskrit pulāka (ball of rice), probably from Dravidian (cf Tamil puḷukku (adjective) simmered, (noun) boiled or parboiled food, puḷukkal cooked rice); probably partly via French pilau (1654; 1680 as pilaw; 1833 as pilaf), Italian pilao (1542).

== History ==
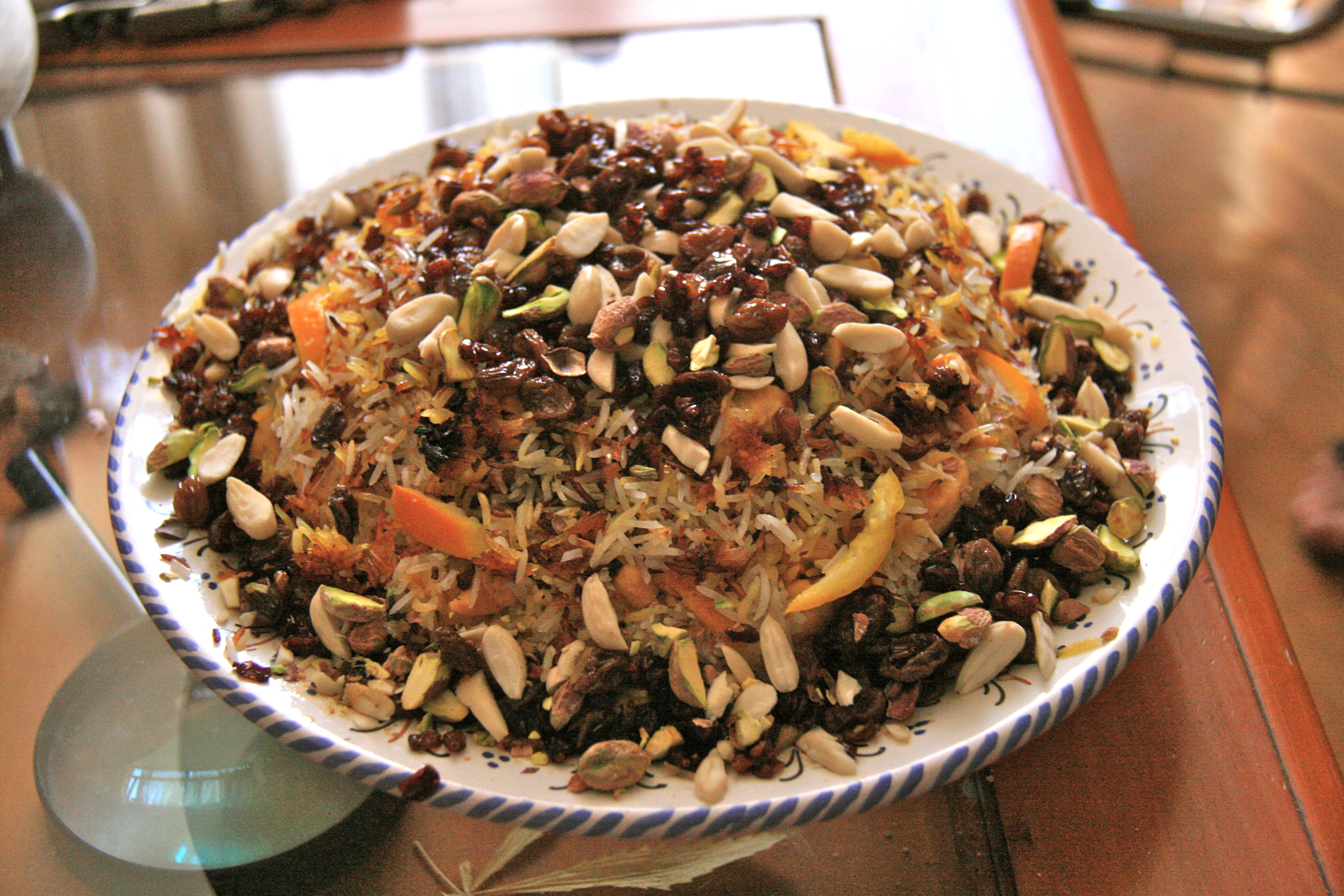
Persian Pollo

It was at the time of the Abbasid Caliphate that methods of cooking rice which approximate modern styles of cooking pilaf at first spread through a vast territory from Spain to Afghanistan, and eventually to a wider world. The Spanish paella, (Note: Roger: " (p. 1143) Under the Abbassids, for example (ninth to twelfth century), during the Golden Age of Islam, there was one single empire from Afghanistan to Spain and the North of Arabia. The size of the empire allowed many foods to spread throughout the Middle East. From India, rice went to Syria, Iraq, and Iran, and eventually, it became known and cultivated all the way to Spain. .... Many dishes of that period are still prepared today with ingredients available to the common people. Some of these are vinegar preserves, roasted meat, and cooked livers, which could be bought in the streets, eaten in the shops, or taken home. Such dishes considerably influenced medieval European and Indian cookery; for example, paella, which evolved from pulao, and pilaf and meat patties that started out as samosa or sambusak.") and the South Asian pilau or pulao, (Note: Nandy: "(p. 11) All around India one finds preparations that came originally from outside South Asia. Kebabs came from West and Central Asia and underwent radical metamorphosis in the hot and dusty plains of India. So did biryani and pulao, two rice preparations, usually with meat. Without them, ceremonial dining in many parts of India, Pakistan, and Bangladesh is incomplete.") and biryani, (Note: Sengupta: "(p. 74) Muslim influence on the style and substance of Indian food was profound. K.T. Achaya writes that the Muslims imported a new refinement and a courtly etiquette of both group and individual dining into the austere dining ambience of Hindu society. ... Babur's son, Humayun, came back to India after spending a long period of exile in Kabul and the Safavid imperial court in Iran. He brought with him an entourage of Persian cooks who introduced the rich and elaborate rice cookery of the Safavid courts to India, combining Indian spices and Persian arts into a rich fusion that became the iconic dish of Islamic South Asian cuisine, the biryani.") evolved from such dishes.

According to food historian Charles Perry, pilaf is a post-10th-century eastern Arabic innovation. Kitab al-Wusla, an early 13th–century cookbook authored by Ibn al-Adim of Aleppo, provides the first recipe for a dish resembling modern pilaf, utilizing a base of rice, meat, chickpeas, and garlic.

The earliest known recipe for pilaf to appear explicitly under the name "pilaf" (or any of its variant spellings) is found in the cookbook Kārnāma dar bāb-e tabbākhī-o san'at-e ān (A Manual of Cookery and Its Art), written in 1521 by Muhammad-'Alī Bāvarchī-e Baghdādī, a cook associated with the court of Ismail I.

The food historian K. T. Achaya suggested that the Sanskrit epic Mahabharata mentions an instance of rice and meat cooked together. Also, according to Achaya, the terms "pulao" and "pallao" are used to refer to a rice dish in ancient Sanskrit works such as the Yājñavalkya Smṛti. However, according to food writers Colleen Taylor Sen and Charles Perry, and social theorist Ashis Nandy, these references do not substantially correlate to the commonly used meaning and history implied in pilafs, which appear in Indian accounts after the medieval Central Asian conquests. Food historian Charles Perry characterized K. T. Achaya's claim as a myth and stated that the term used by Achaya for pilaf refers to "raw meat or fish". He further stated that Achaya mostly reported conclusions drawn by other people from primary evidence without verification. According to Charles Perry, there is no sign of pulao in ancient India, and the Sanskrit word that became pulao in later Indian languages originally meant "shriveled, blighted, empty, or bad grain"—which points to some other dish rather than pilaf.

Similarly, Alexander the Great and his army, many centuries earlier, in the 4th century BCE, have been reported to have been so impressed with the Eastern Iranic Bactrian and Sogdian palāvs that his soldiers brought the recipes back to Macedon when they returned. Similar stories exist of Alexander bringing pilaf to the ancient Sogdian Samarkand; however, they are considered apocryphal by archaeologist John Boardman. Similarly, it has been reported that pilaf was consumed in the Byzantine Empire and in the Republic of Venice.

Thirteenth-century texts describing the consistency of pilaf state that the grains should be plump and somewhat firm to resemble peppercorns with no mushiness, and each grain should be separate with no clumping.

According to Encyclopædia Iranica, the earliest attestation of pilaf in Persian is found in the 14th-century Persian satirical poem Mūš-o gorba by Ubayd Zakani.

Another primary source for pilaf dishes comes from the 17th-century Iranian philosopher Molla Sadra.

== Preparation ==
Some cooks prefer to use basmati rice because it is easier to prepare a pilaf where the grains stay "light, fluffy and separate" with this type of rice. However, other types of long-grain rice are also used. The rice is rinsed thoroughly before use to remove the surface starch. Pilaf can be cooked in water or stock. Common additions include fried onions and fragrant spices like cardamom, bay leaves and cinnamon.

Pilaf is usually made with meat or vegetables, but it can also be made plain which is called sade pilav in Turkish, chelo in Persian and ruzz mufalfal in Arabic. Persian pilaf uses saffron which gives Persian rice flavor and a yellow color. Pilaf is often made by adding the rice to hot fat and stirring briefly before adding the cooking liquid. The fat used varies from recipe to recipe. Cooking methods vary with respect to details such as pre-soaking the rice and steaming after boiling.

== Local varieties ==
There are thousands of variations of pilaf made with rice or other grains like bulgur. Some include different combinations of meats, fruits or vegetables, while others are simple and served plain.

Central Asian, South Asian, Iranian and Caribbean cuisine are some with distinctive styles of making pilaf.

=== Afghanistan ===
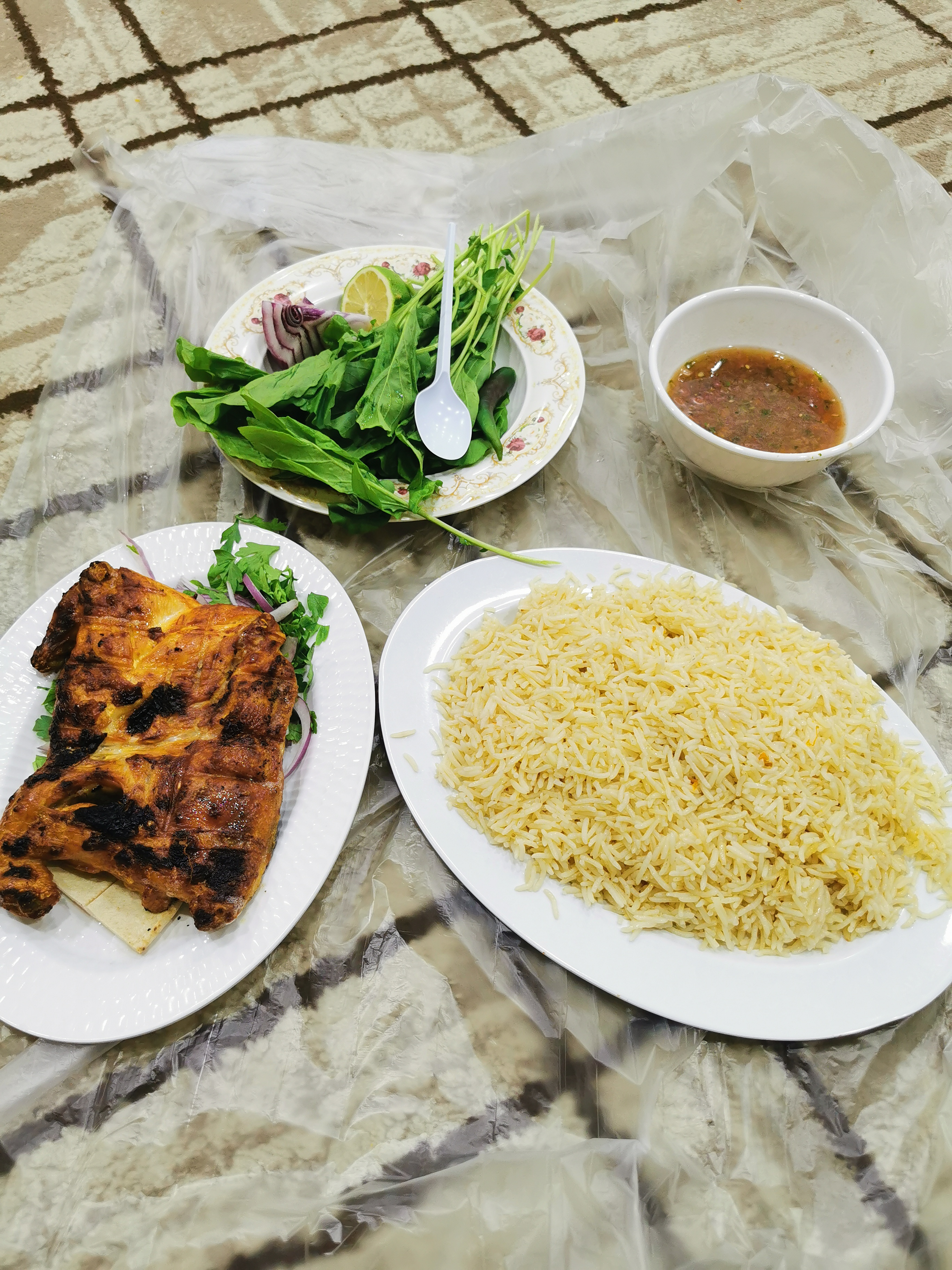
Bukhari (pilaf) meal in Saudi Arabia

In Afghan cuisine, Kabuli palaw (Persian: کابلی پلو) is made by cooking basmati with mutton, lamb, beef or chicken, and oil. Kabuli palaw is cooked in large shallow and thick dishes. Fried sliced carrots and raisins are added. Chopped nuts like pistachios, walnuts, or almonds may be added as well. The meat is covered by the rice or buried in the middle of the dish. Kabuli palaw rice with carrots and raisins is very popular in Saudi Arabia, where it is known as roz Bukhari (Arabic: رز بخاري), meaning 'Bukharan rice'.

=== Albania ===
In Albanian cuisine, pilaf is a very common dish. It is typically accompanied by yogurt and eaten with bean stew, meat soup or baked meats such as chicken and lamb. Medium-long grain rice is used, and it is cooked plainly with butter, resulting in a soft yet non-sticky texture.

There are various rice dishes in Albania, which are all commonly referred to as pilaf.

Albania ranks among the top three countries in Europe for rice consumption.

=== Armenia ===
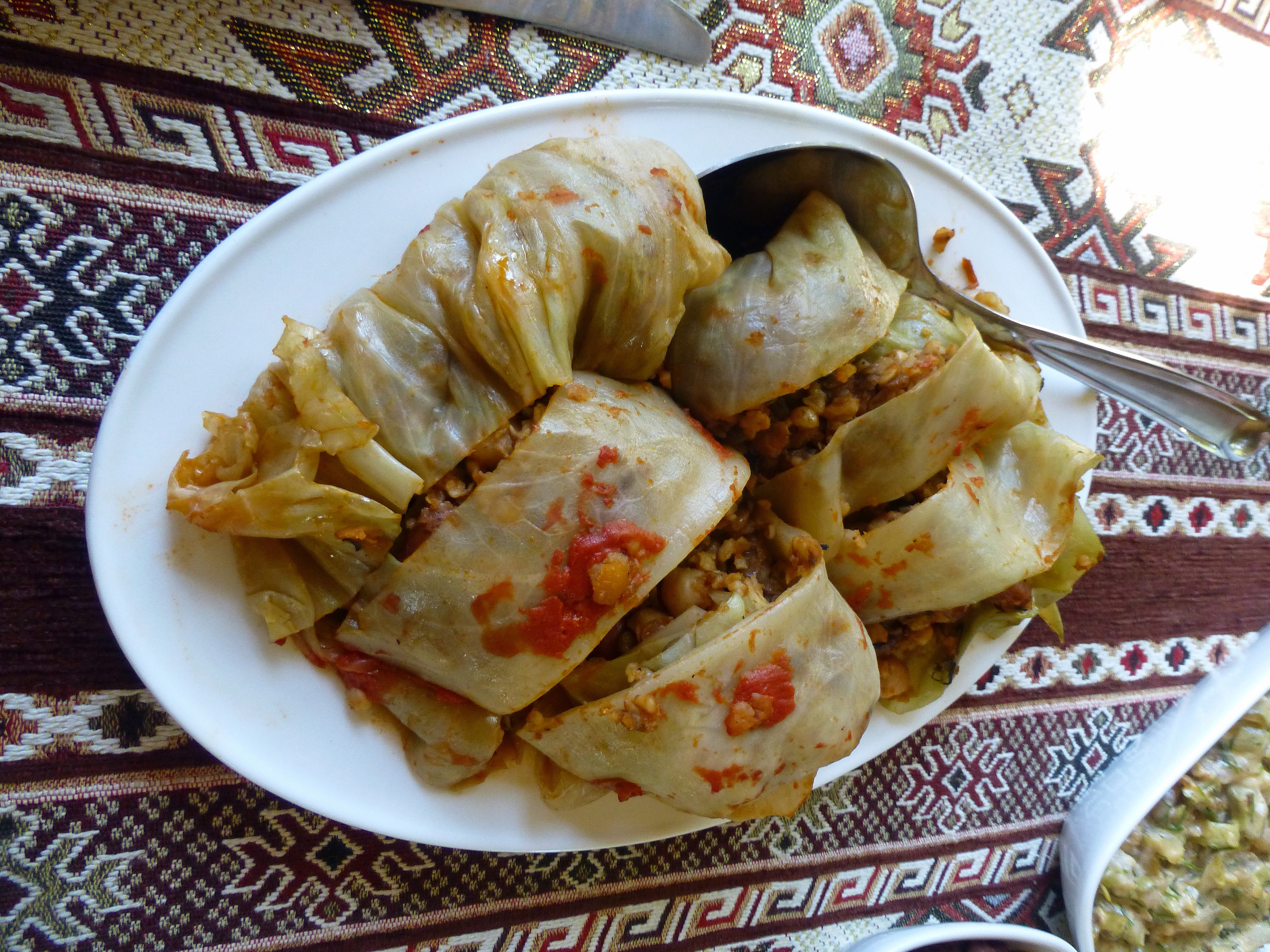
Armenian cabbage roll stuffed with chickpeas and bulgur pilaf

Armenians use a lot of bulgur ("cracked wheat") in their pilaf dishes. Armenian recipes may combine vermicelli or orzo with rice cooked in stock seasoned with mint, parsley and allspice. One traditional Armenian pilaf is made with the same noodle rice mixture cooked in stock with raisins, almonds and allspice.

Armenian kinds of rice are discussed by Rose Baboian in her cookbook from 1964 which includes recipes for different pilafs, most rooted in her birthplace of Antep in Turkey. Baboian recommends that the noodles be stir-fried first in chicken fat before being added to the pilaf. Another Armenian cookbook written by Vağinag Pürad recommends to render poultry fat in the oven with red pepper until the fat mixture turns a red color before using the strained fat to prepare pilaf.

Lapa is an Armenian word with several meanings one of which is a "watery boiled rice, thick rice soup, mush" and lepe which refers to various rice dishes differing by region. Antranig Azhderian describes Armenian pilaf as a "dish resembling porridge".

=== Azerbaijan ===
Azerbaijani cuisine includes more than 40 different plov recipes. Traditional Azerbaijani plov consists of three distinct components, served simultaneously on separate platters: rice (warm, never hot), meat, and herbs.

Rice pilaf examples from Azerbaijan

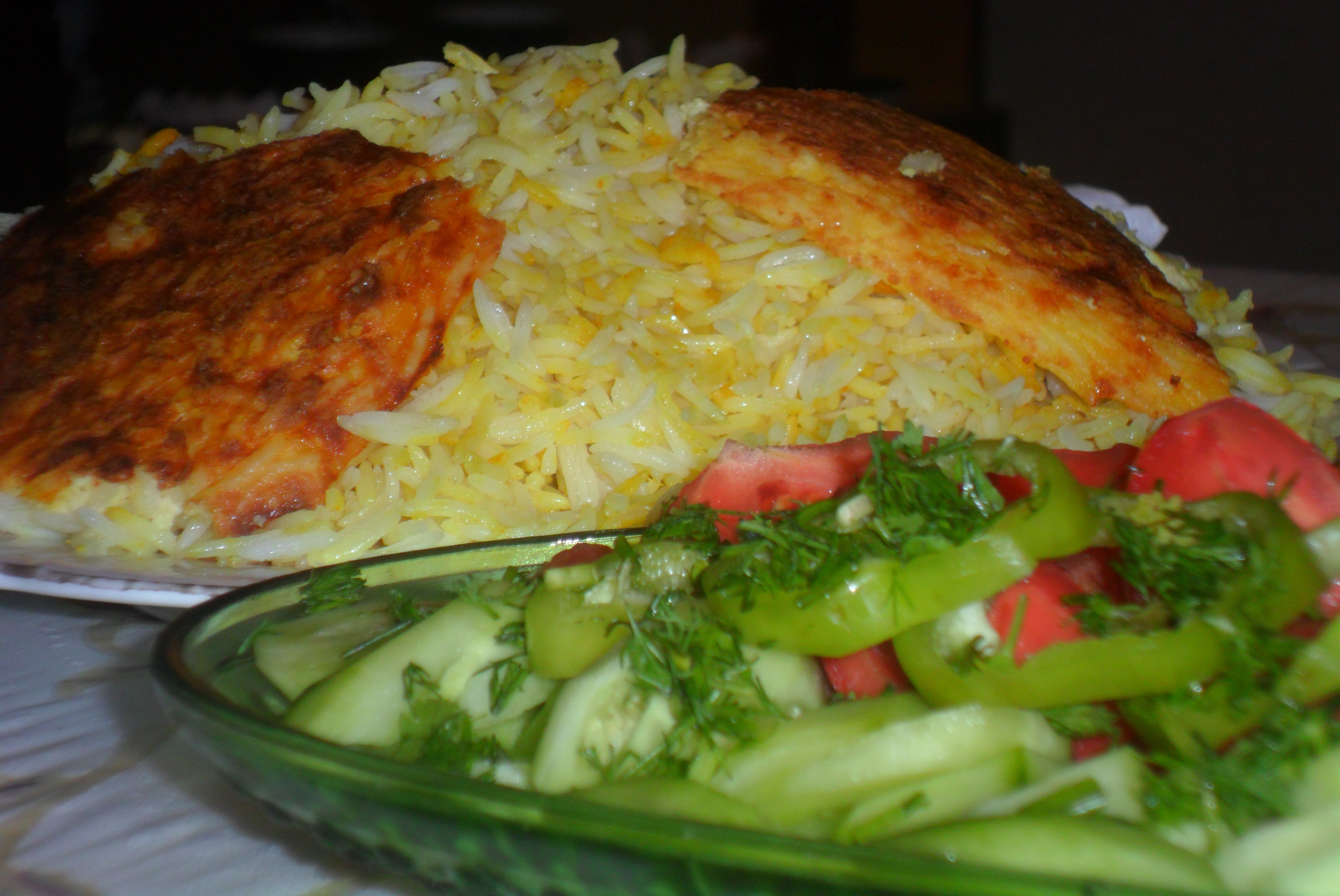
Azerbaijani plov with caramelized rice, served with choban salad

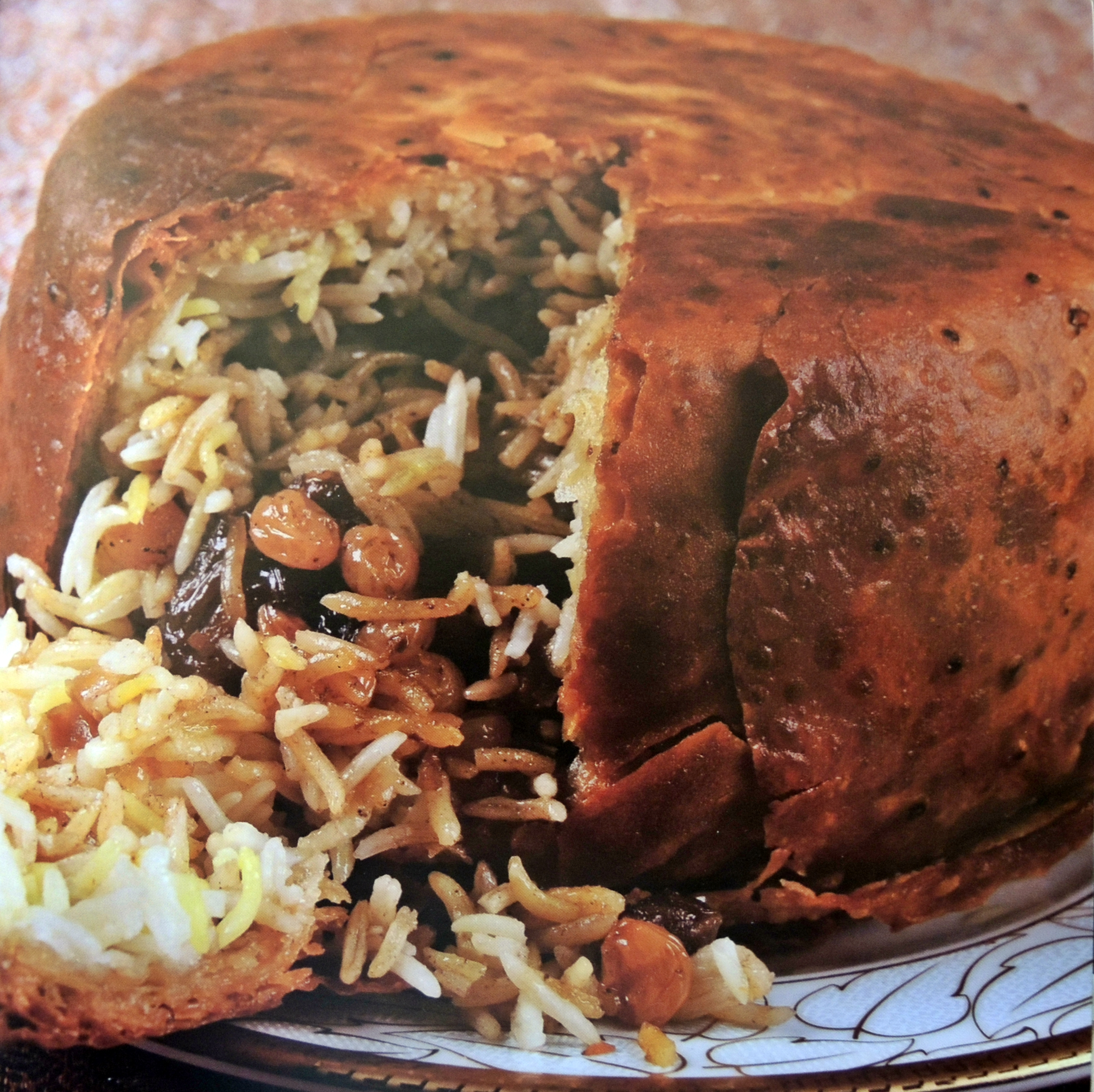
Azerbaijani shah-pilaf

=== Bangladesh ===
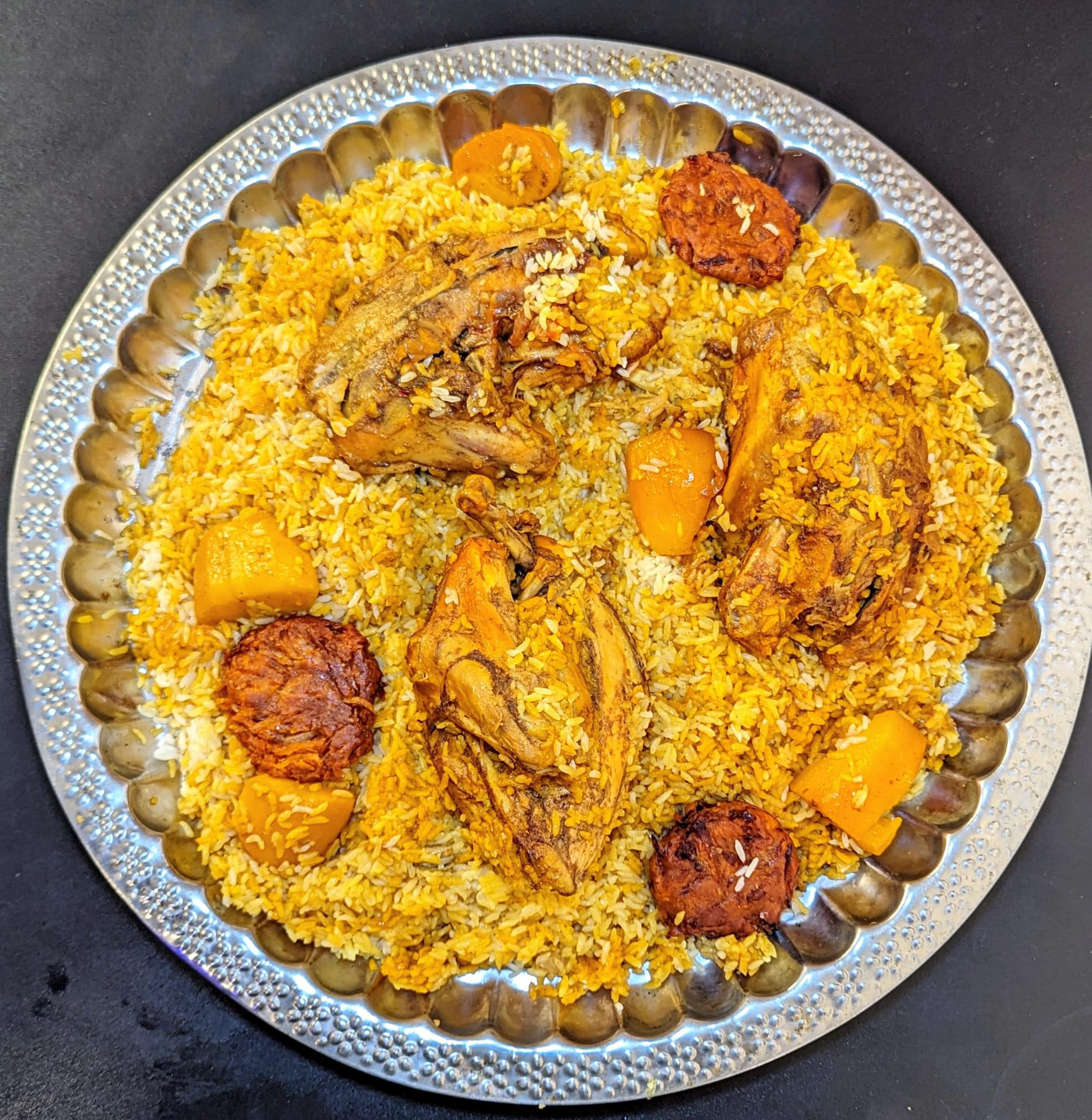
Traditional Old Dhaka style chicken pilaf, locally known as Murog Polao

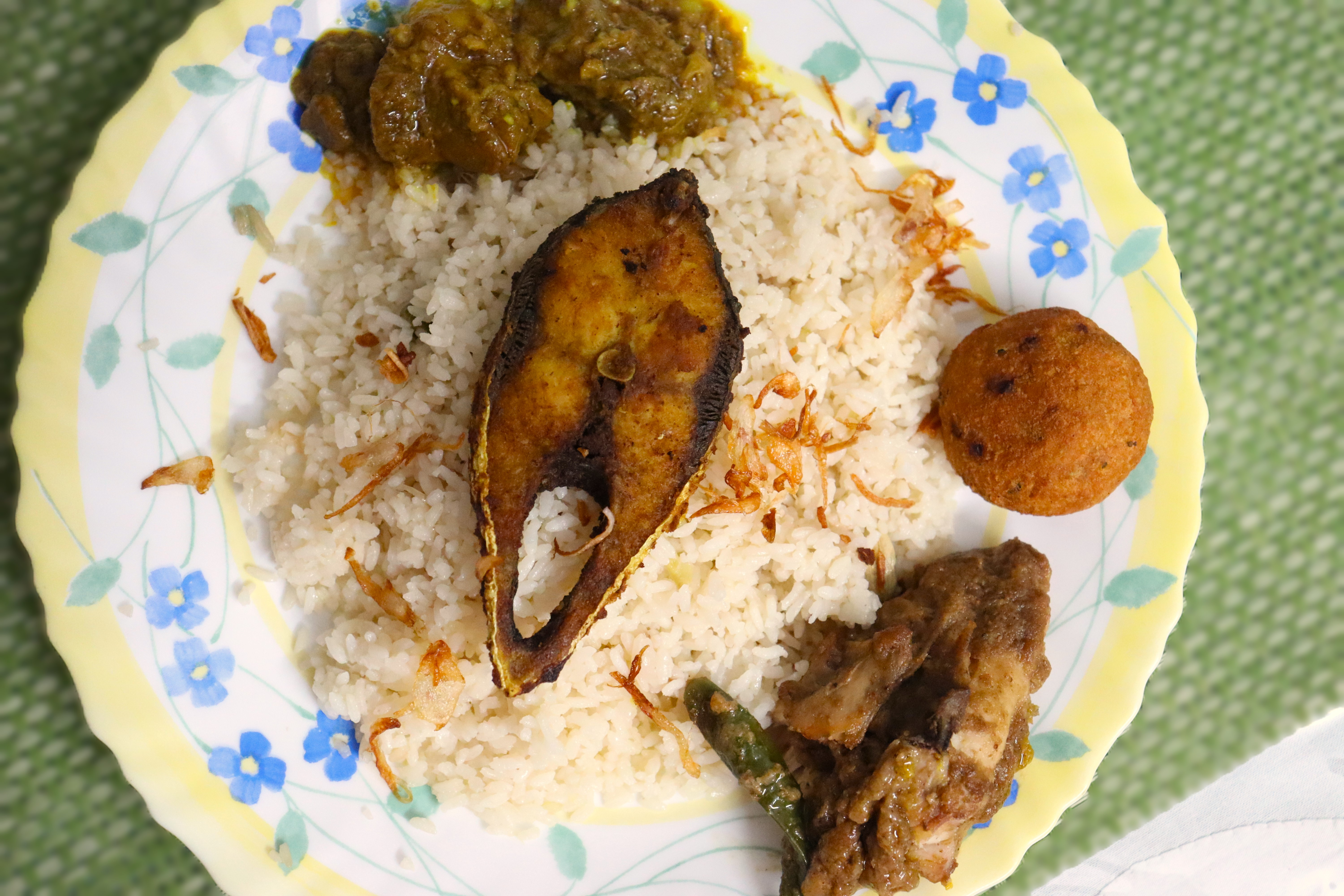
A classic Bangladeshi holiday lunch: plain pilaf served with fried hilsa, kebab, and rich chicken or beef korma.

In Bangladesh, polao (পোলাও), is a popular ceremonial dish cooked only with aromatic rice. Bangladesh cultivates many varieties of aromatic rice, which can be found only in this country and some surrounding Indian states with predominantly Bengali populations. Historically, there were many varieties of aromatic rice. These included short-grain rice with buttery and other fragrances depending on the variety. Over a long span of time, many recipes were lost and then reinvented.

Since the 1970s in Bangladesh pulao has referred to aromatic rice (বাসন্তী পোলাও) Bashonti polao, first fried either in oil or clarified butter with onions, fresh ginger and whole aromatic spices such as cardamom, cinnamon, black pepper, and more, depending on each household and region. This is then cooked in stock or water, first boiled and then steamed. It is finished off with a bit more clarified butter and fragrant essences such as rose water or kewra water. For presentation, beresta (fried onions) are sprinkled on top. Chicken pulao, (morog pulao) is a traditional ceremonial dish among the Bangladeshi Muslim community. There are several different types of morog pulao found only in particular regions or communities.

In Sylhet and Chittagong, a popular ceremonial dish called akhni polao. Aqni being the rich stock in which mutton is cooked and then used to cook the rice. Another very spicy Polao dish very popular and unique to Bangladesh is called Tehari. It is very different in taste to the tahris found in some parts of neighboring India. They are most popularly eaten with beef and chevon (goat meat) but are also paired with chicken. Young small potatoes, mustard oil (which is alternated with clarified butter or oil depending on individual taste), and a unique spice blend found in teharis distinguish them from other meat polaos. The most famous tehari in the capital city of Dhaka is called Hajir biryani. Although here the name biryani is a misnomer, in usage among the urban young population it differentiates the popular dish mutton biryanis (goat meat).

=== Brazil ===
A significantly modified version of the recipe, often seen as influenced by what is called arroz pilau there, is known in Brazil as arroz de frango desfiado or risoto de frango (Portuguese: [ɐˈʁoz dʒi ˈfɾɐ̃ɡu dʒisfiˈadu], "shredded chicken rice"; [ʁiˈzotu], "chicken risotto"). Rice lightly fried (and optionally seasoned), salted and cooked until soft (but neither soupy nor sticky) in either water or chicken stock is added to chicken stock, onions and sometimes cubed bell peppers (cooked in the stock), shredded chicken breast, green peas, tomato sauce, shoyu, and optionally vegetables (e.g. canned sweet corn, cooked carrot cubes, courgette cubes, broccolini flowers, chopped broccoli or broccolini stalks or leaves fried in garlic seasoning) or herbs (e.g., mint, like in canja) to form a distantly risotto-like dish – but it is generally fluffy (depending on the texture of the rice being added), as generally, once all ingredients are mixed, it is not left to cook longer than five minutes. In the case shredded chicken breast is not added, with the rice being instead served alongside chicken and sauce suprême, it is known as arroz suprême de frango (Portuguese: [ɐˈʁos suˈpɾẽm(i) dʒi ˈfɾɐ̃ɡu], "chicken supreme rice").

=== Caribbean ===
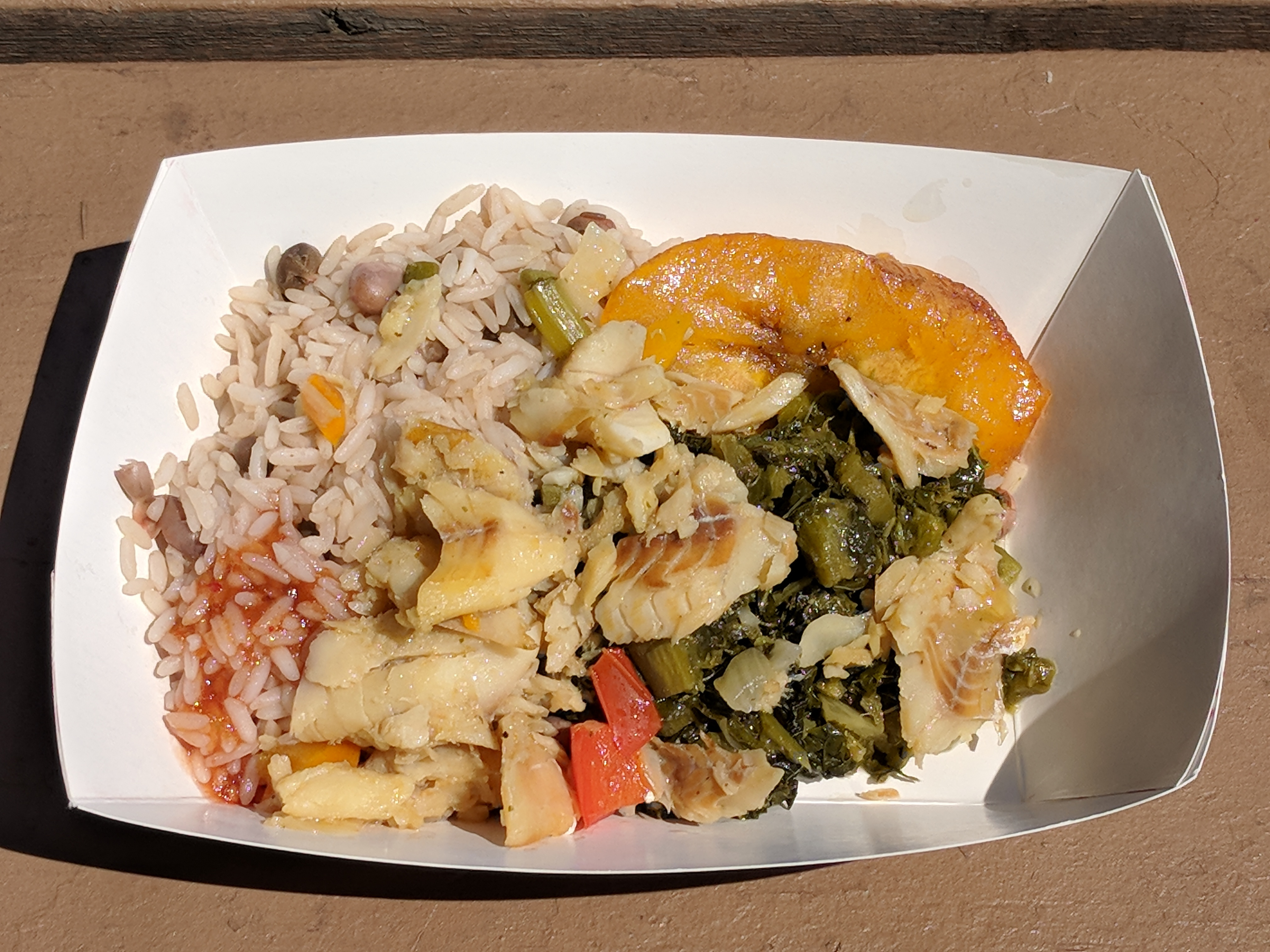
Caribbean-style pelau with saltfish and callaloo

In the Eastern Caribbean and other Caribbean territories there are variations of pelau which include a wide range of ingredients such as pigeon peas, green peas, green beans, corn, carrots, pumpkin, and meat such as beef or chicken, or cured pig tail. The seasoned meat is usually cooked in a stew, with the rice and other vegetables added afterwards. Coconut milk and spices are also key additions in some islands.

Trinidad is recognized for its pelau, a layered rice with meats and vegetables. It is a mix of traditional African cuisine and "New World" ingredients like ketchup. The process of browning the meat (usually chicken, but also stew beef or lamb) in sugar is an African technique.

In Tobago, pelau is commonly made with crab.

=== Central Asia ===
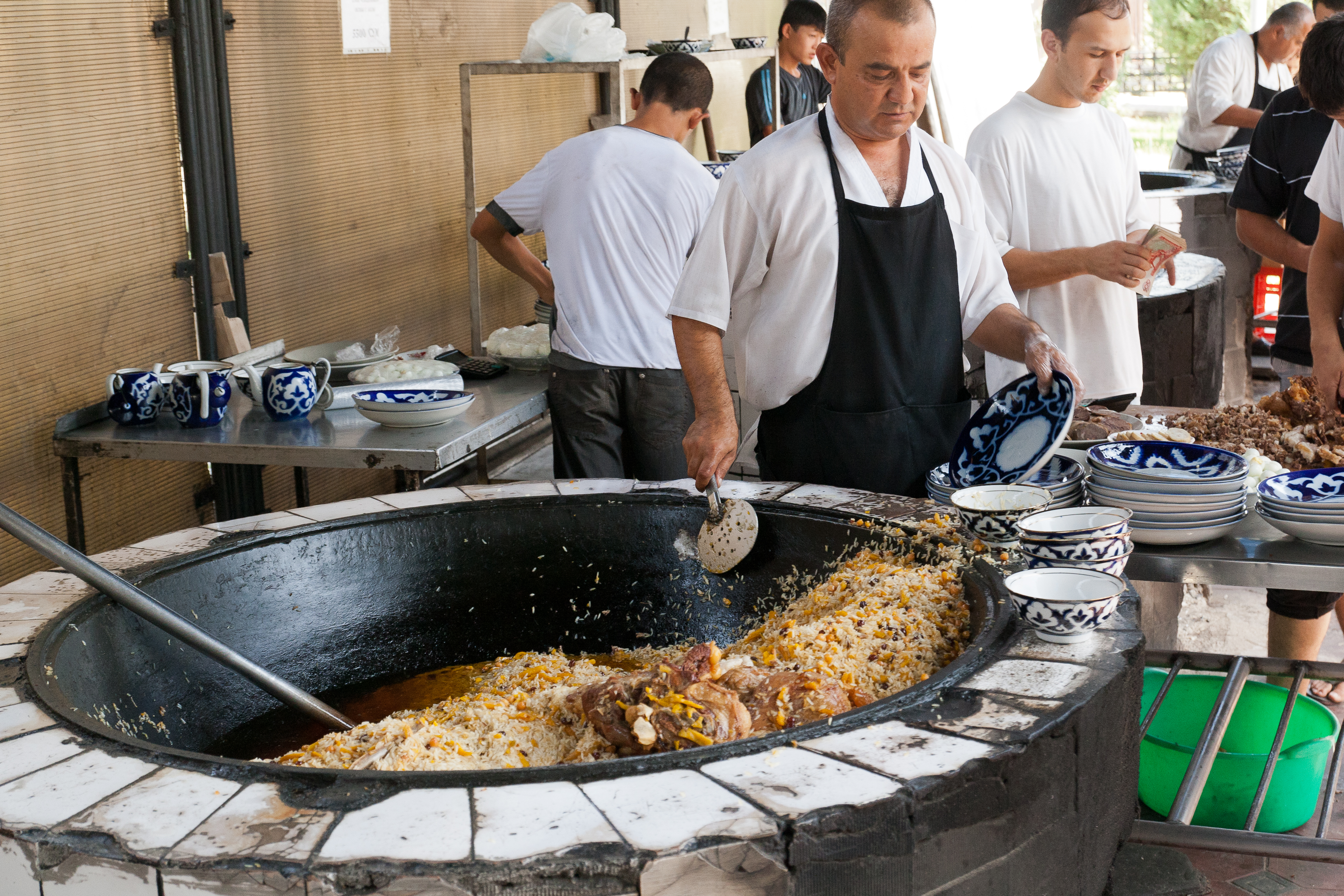
Restaurant cooking in Tashkent

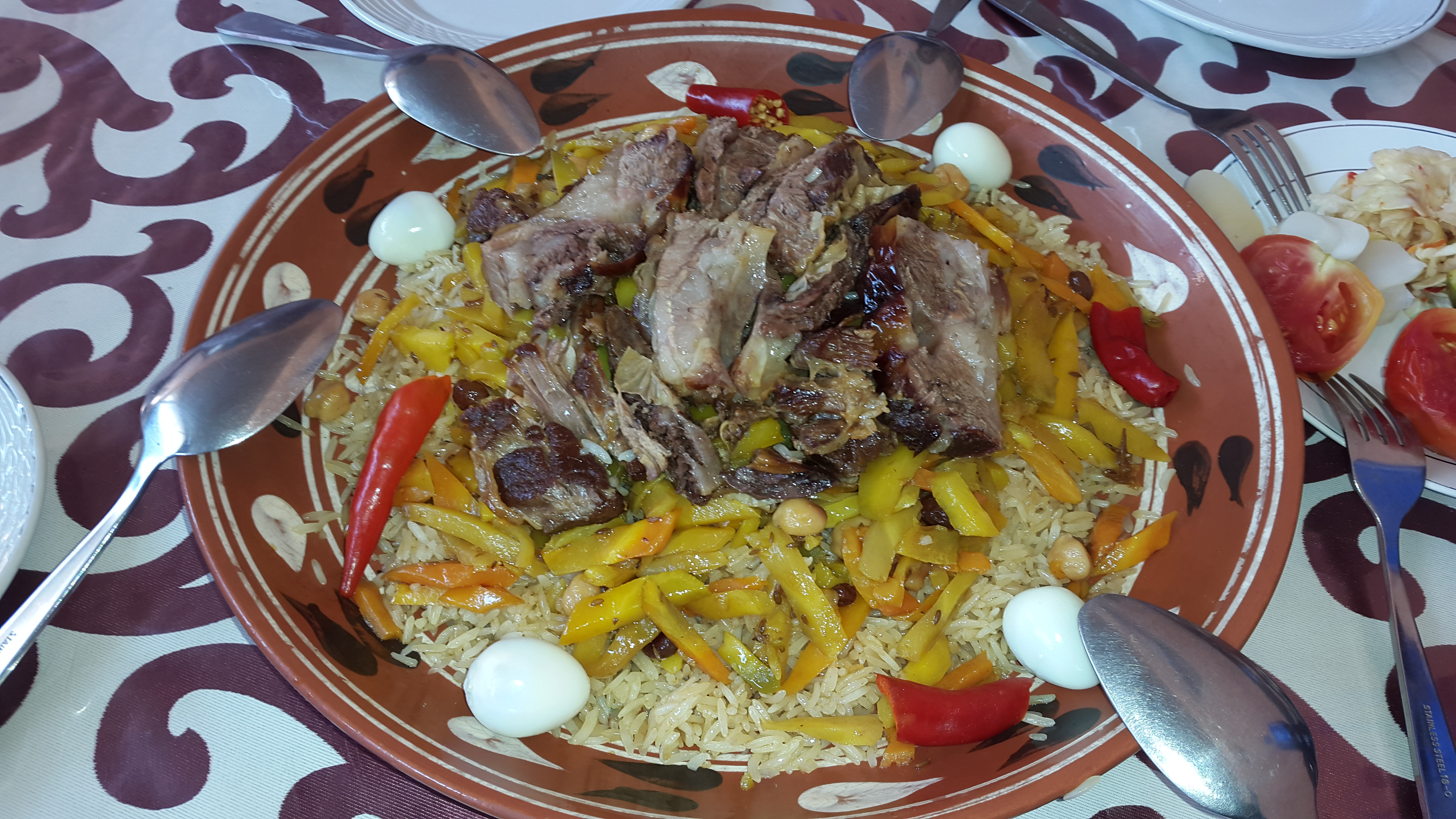
Samarkand pilaf cooked with linseed oil

Central Asian, e.g. Uzbek, Kyrgyz and Tajik (Uzbek: Osh, Palov, Kyrgyz: Аш, палоо, Tajik: Палов) Kazakh, Turkmen, Karakalpak (Kazakh: Палау, Palaw) or osh differs from other preparations in that rice is not steamed, but instead simmered in a rich stew of meat and vegetables called zirvak (зирвак), until all the liquid is absorbed into the rice. A limited degree of steaming is commonly achieved by covering the pot. It is usually cooked in a kazon (or deghi) over an open fire. The cooking tradition includes many regional and occasional variations. Commonly, it is prepared with lamb or beef, browned in lamb fat or oil, and then stewed with fried onions, garlic and carrots. Chicken palov is rare but found in traditional recipes originating in Bukhara. Some regional varieties use distinct types of oil to cook the meat. For example, Samarkand-style plov commonly uses zig'ir oil, a mix of melon seed, cottonseed, sesame seed, and flaxseed oils. Plov is usually simply spiced with salt, peppercorns, and cumin, but coriander, barberries, red pepper, or marigold may be added according to regional variation or the chef's preference. Heads of garlic and chickpeas are sometimes buried into the rice during cooking. Sweet variations with dried apricots, cranberries and raisins are prepared on special occasions.

Plov is the national dish of Uzbekistan and Tajikistan, which was recognized by UNESCO and inscribed on its Intangible Cultural Heritage of Humanity list in 2016. However, neighbouring countries, including Kazakhstan and Azerbaijan, also consider plov a staple dish, with their own regional variations reflecting local ingredients and cooking.

Although often prepared at home, plov is made on special occasions by an oshpaz (Tajik: ошпаз) or ashpoz (osh/ash master chef), who cooks it over an open flame, sometimes serving up to 1,000 people from a single cauldron on holidays or occasions such as weddings. Oshi nahor, or "morning palov", is served in the early morning (between 6 and 9 am) to large gatherings of guests, typically as part of an ongoing wedding celebration.

Plov is found in the post-Soviet countries and Xinjiang Uyghur Autonomous Region of China. In Xinjiang, where the dish is known as polu, polo, or pola (Uyghur: پولو، پولۇ، پولا), it is often served with pickled vegetables, including carrots, onion and tomato.

Rice pilaf examples from Central Asia

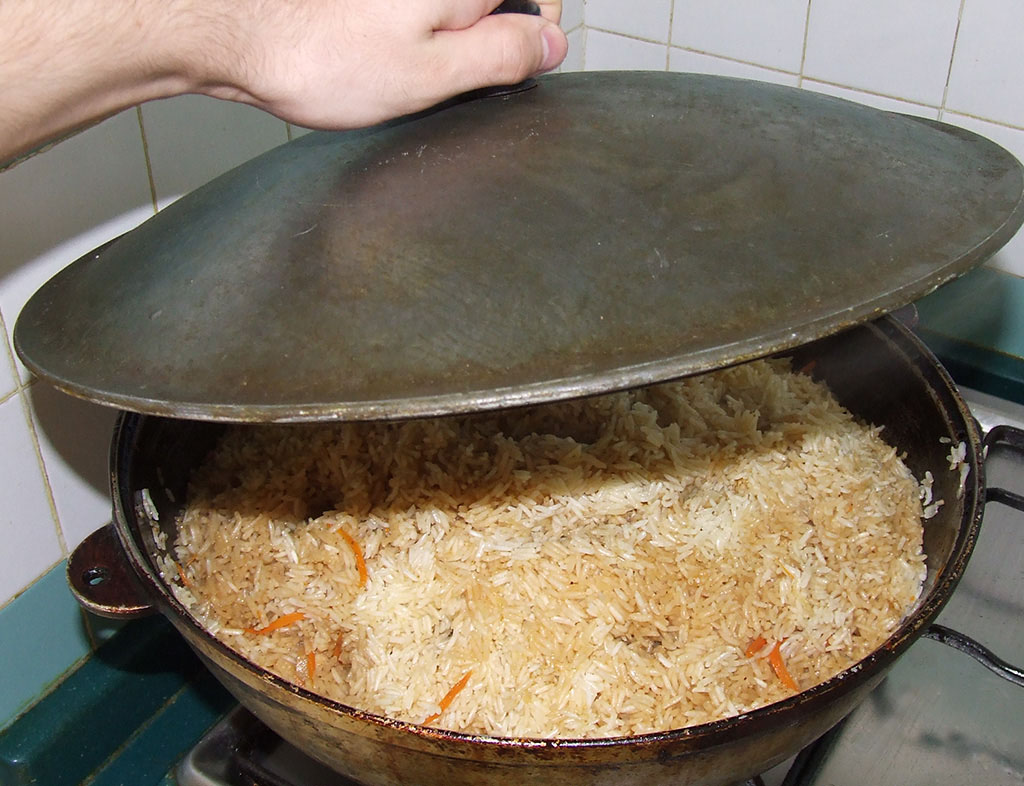
Uzbek plov being prepared in a kazon in a Tashkent home

Tajik oshi palov being prepared with kabobi toki (stuffed grape leafs)

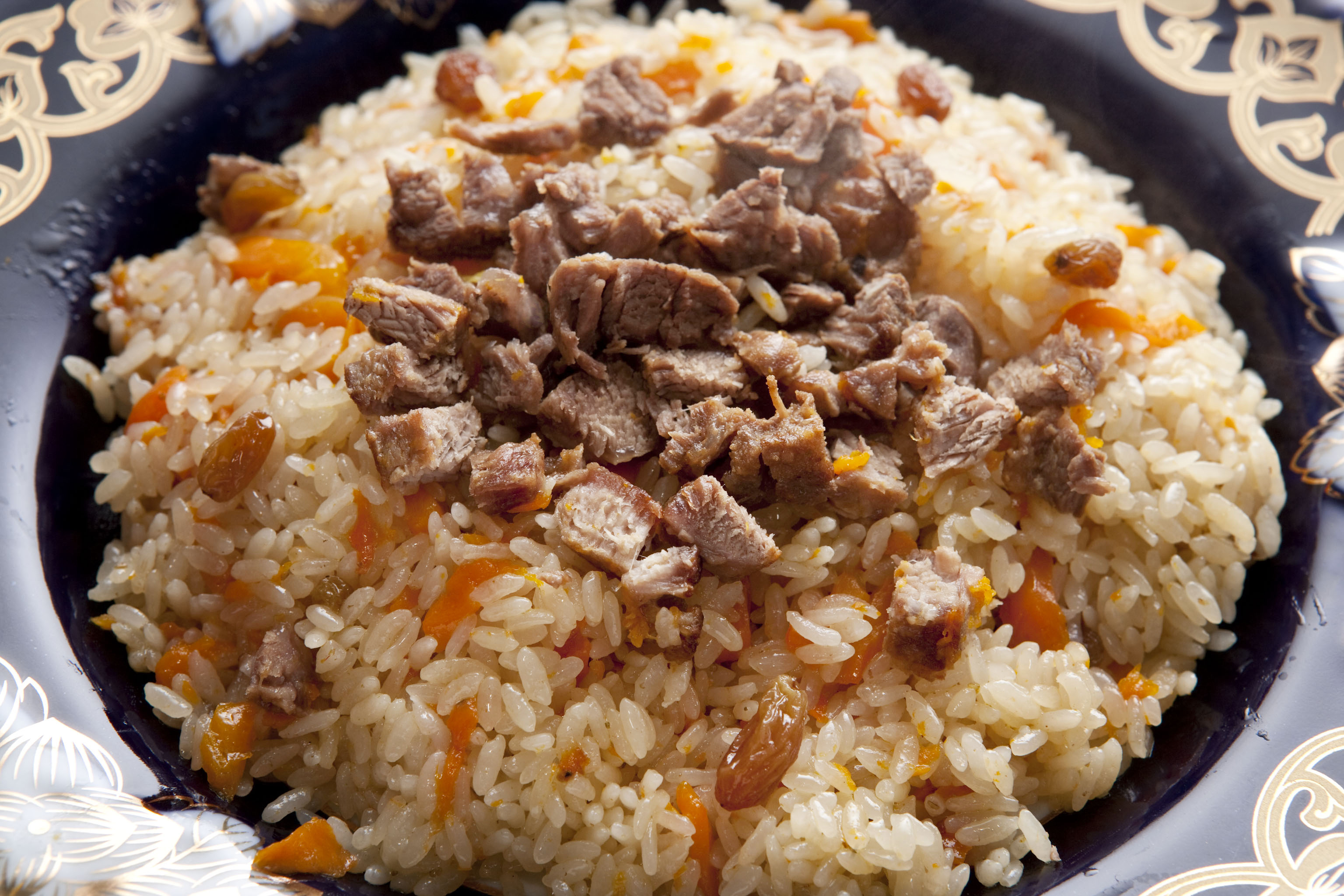
Uyghur polu

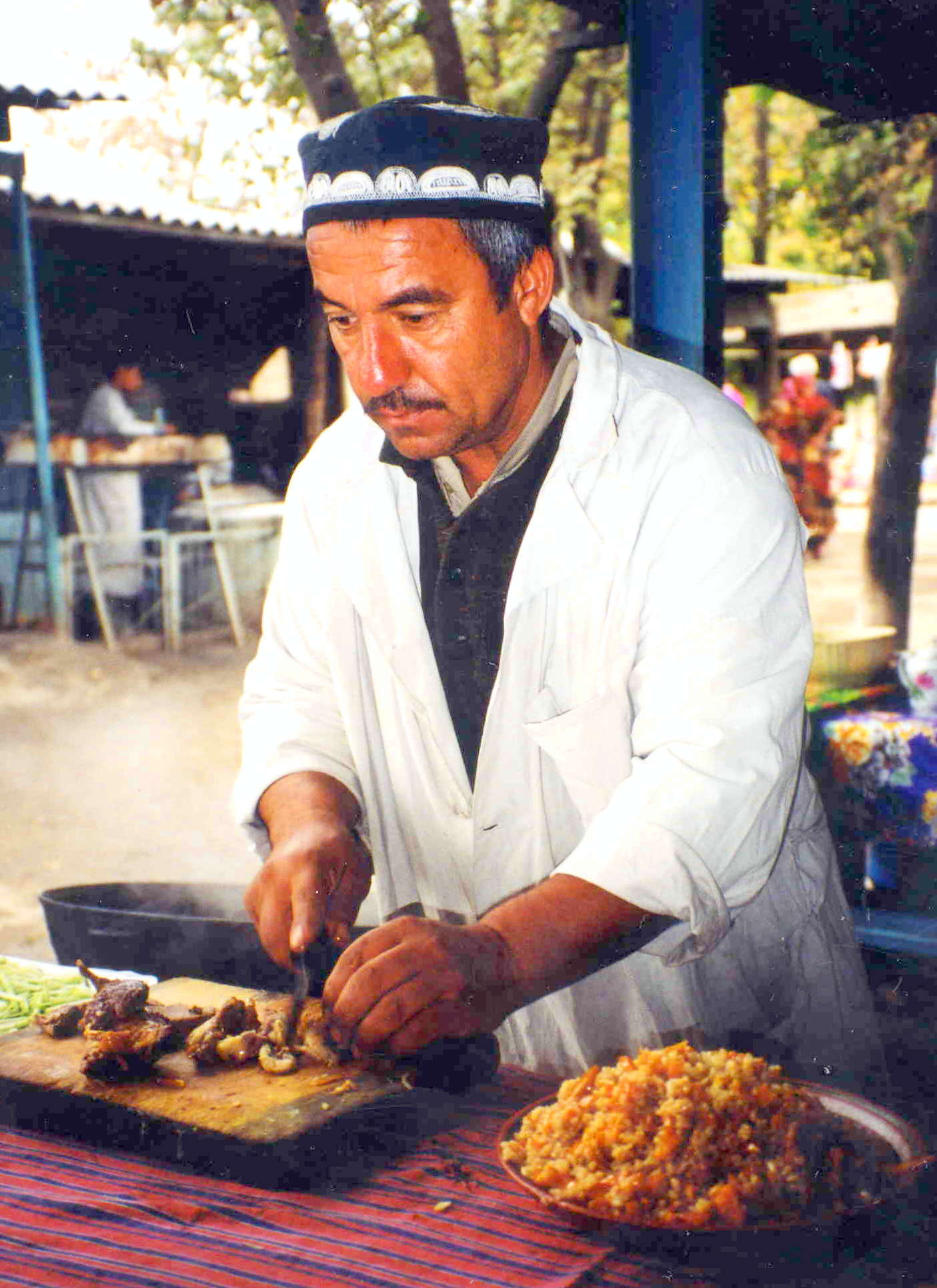
Tajik oshpaz

=== Greece ===
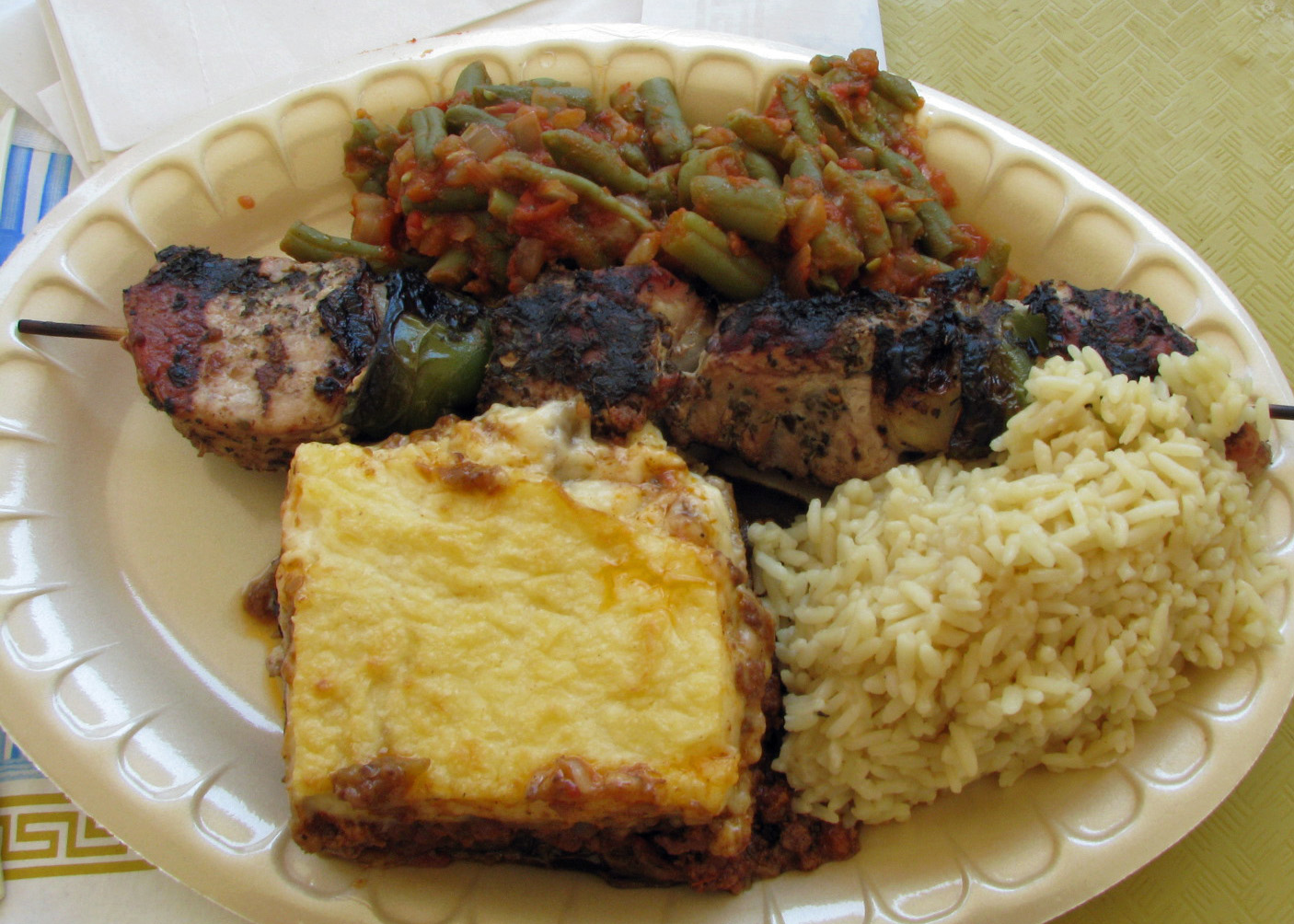
A Greek meal with rice pilaf (bottom right)

In Greek cuisine, piláfi (πιλάφι) is fluffy and soft, but neither soupy nor sticky, rice that has been boiled in a meat stock or bouillon broth. In Northern Greece, it is considered improper to prepare piláfi on a stovetop; the pot is properly placed in the oven. Gamopílafo ("wedding pilaf") is the prized pilaf served traditionally at weddings and major celebrations in Crete: rice is boiled in lamb or goat broth, then finished with lemon juice. Although it bears the name, Gamopílafo is not a pilaf but rather a kind of risotto, with a creamy and not fluffy texture.

=== Hungary ===
Pilaf (piláf or rízseshús) is a popular national dish in Hungary. It is believed to have been popularised in Hungary during the Ottoman period. It is characterised by rice cooked in broth, with meat, onions and paprika, along with a choice of vegetables and additional herbs and/or spices.

=== India ===
Pulao is usually a mixture of rice with vegetables, usually peas, potatoes, green beans, carrots and sometimes includes any one kind of meat like chicken, fish, lamb, goat, pork or prawns. A typical Bengali style pulao is prepared using vegetarian ingredients like Long grain rice or aromatic rice, cashewnut, raisin, ghee and various spices like nutmeg, bay leaf, cinnamon, cardamom, cumin, clove and mace. There are also a few very elaborate pulaos with Persian names like hazar pasand ("a thousand delights"). In Karnataka palav along with a variant called Rice Bath is a staple breakfast available in most of the restaurants. It is usually served on special occasions and weddings, though it is not uncommon to eat it for a regular lunch or dinner meal. It is considered very high in food energy and fat. A pulao is often complemented with either spiced yogurt or raita.

Rice pilaf examples from India

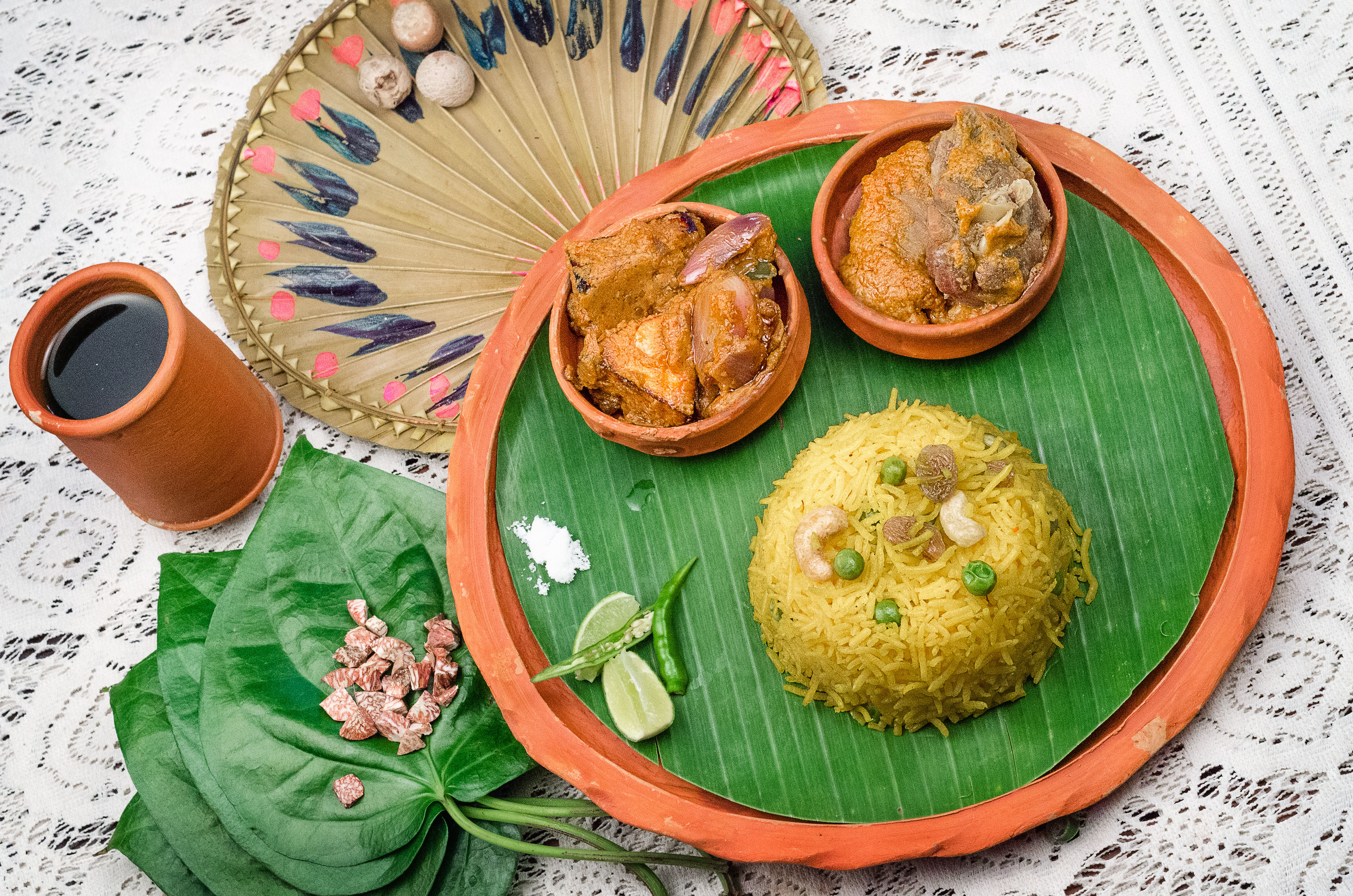
Pulao Mutton, from West Bengal, India

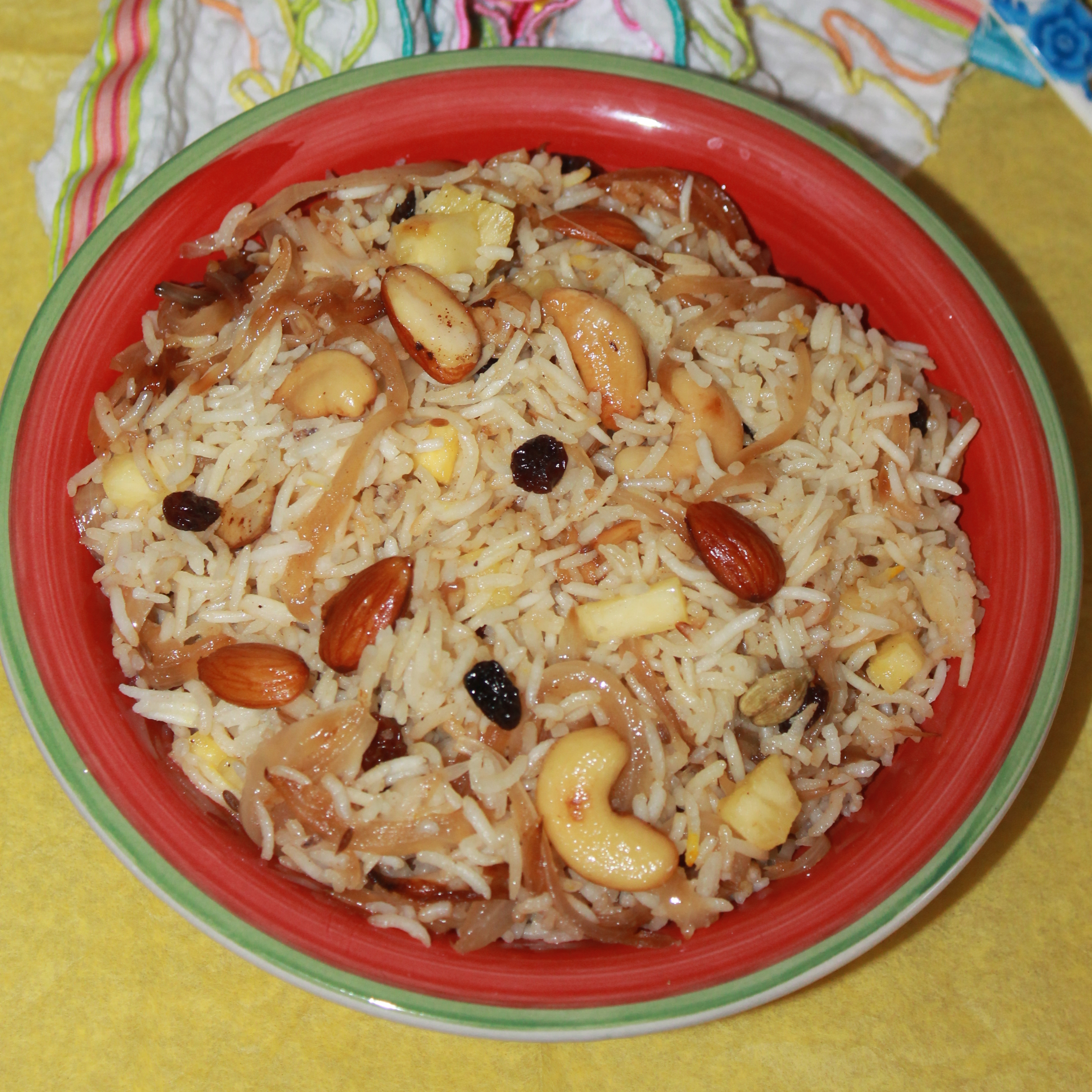
Kashmiri pulao with nuts and fruit

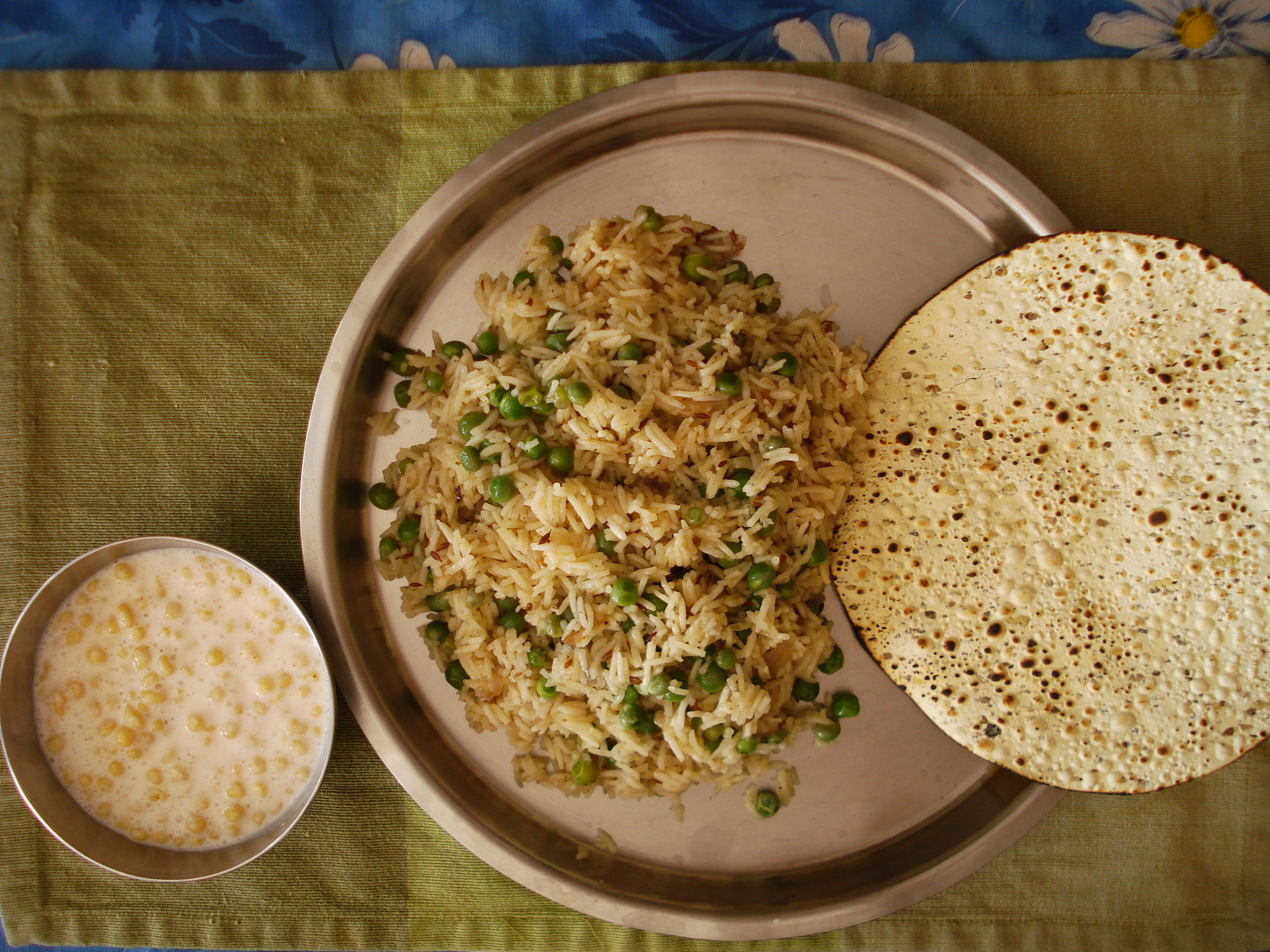
Matar pulao with peas served with boondi raita and papadum

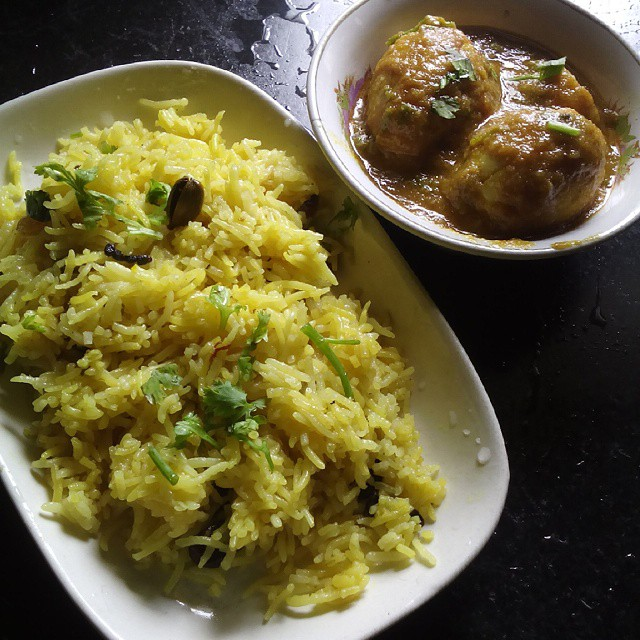
Pulao served alongside eggs in gravy

=== Indonesia ===
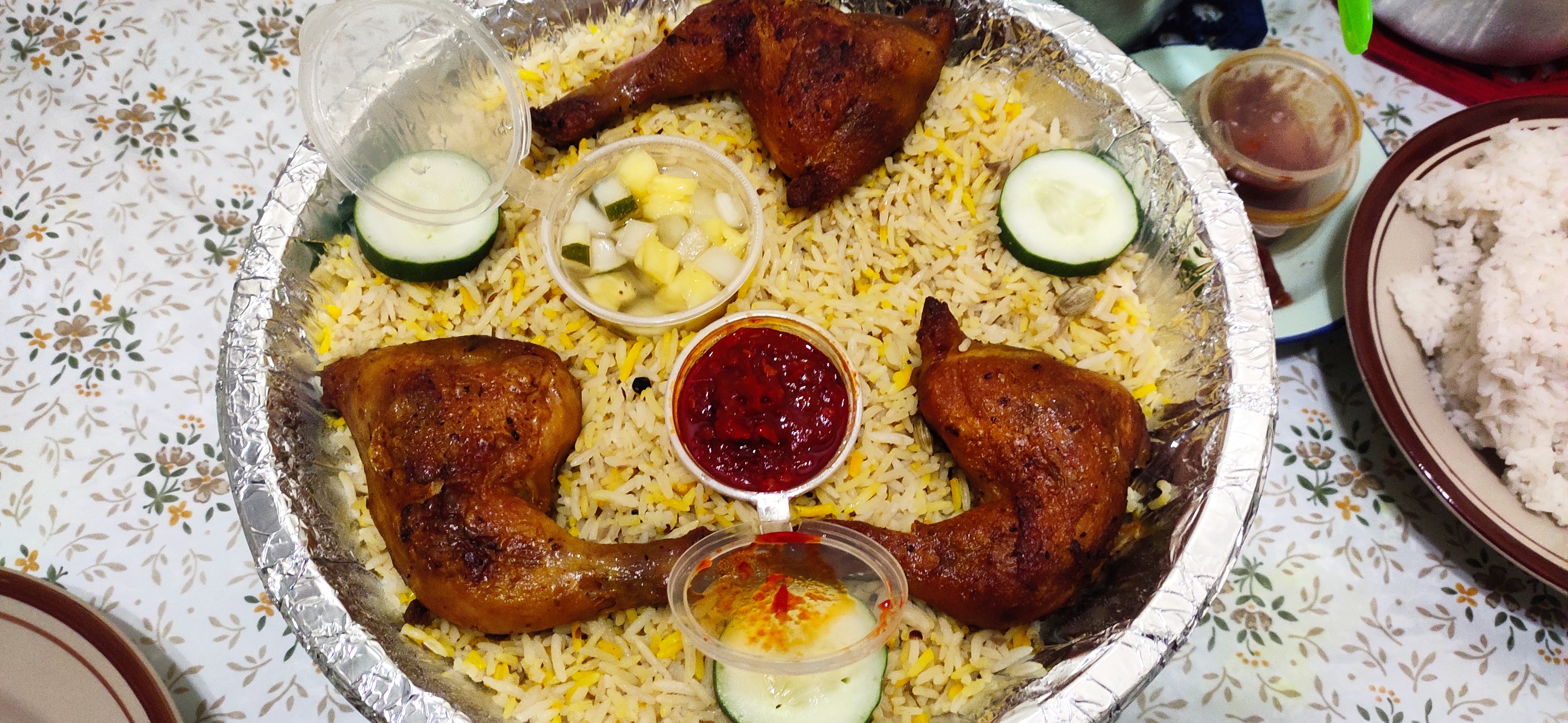
A portion of kebuli rice served with acar and sambal.

The Arab community in Indonesia, largely descended from migrants from Hadhramaut in Yemen who arrived in Java between the 18th and 19th centuries through Indian Ocean trade networks, developed a local version of pilaf called Nasi kebuli, an accultured dish within Arab Indonesian cuisine and said to derive its name from the kabuli pulao of Afghanistan, along with nasi kebuli, another type of pilaf that has become popular among Arab Indonesians is Nasi mandi. According to Gagas Ulung and Deerona in their book Jejak Kuliner Arab di Pulau Jawa (2014), the origin of nasi kebuli indicate that prior to settling in Java, Hadhrami migrants spent time in Gujarat, where interaction with local food traditions, transmitted in part by Kerala cooks working aboard Gujarati trading vessels, contributed to the formation of the dish before it was further adapted to Indonesian tastes through intermarriage and cultural blending. Nasi kebuli is characterized by long grain Basmati rice, cooked in goat meat broth, milk and ghee, and seasoned with garlic, shallots and spices such as cardamom, cloves, cumin, coriander, nutmeg, black pepper, and cinnamon; it is typically served with goat meat or chicken, and may be accompanied by raisins or dates, sambal goreng ati, maraq soup, acar or pickled pineapples, sambal, and emping crackers. In Indonesia, particularly within Betawi and Arab Indonesian communities, nasi kebuli is closely associated with Islamic religious festivals such as Eid al Fitr, Eid al Adha, and Mawlid, as well as weddings, cultural gatherings, and official state banquets.

=== Iran ===
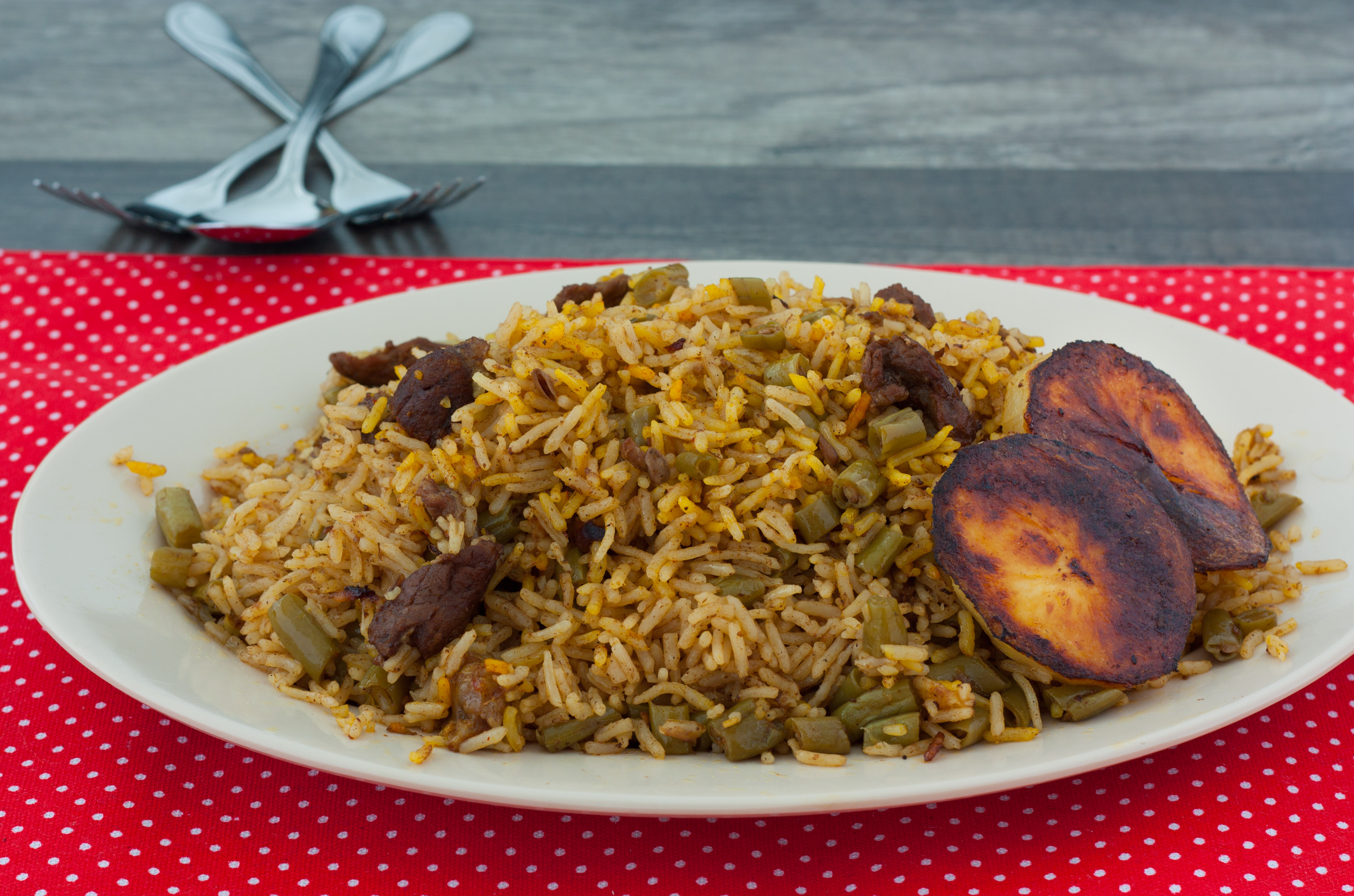
Lubia polo, 'Persian rice with green beans' in Iran

Persian culinary terms referring to rice preparation are numerous and ancient and have influenced and found their way into the neighbouring languages: polow (from which the word "pilaf" is derived around the world; rice cooked in broth while the grains remain separate, straining the half cooked rice before adding the broth and then "brewing"), chelow (white rice with separate grains), kateh (sticky rice) and tahchin (slow cooked rice, vegetables, and meat cooked in a specially designed dish). One of the many unique ingredients used in Persian rice is saffron. There are a wide variety of Persian rice dishes (up to 100 dishes) with vegetables and herbs which are very popular among Iranians.

There are four primary methods of cooking rice in Iran:

- Chelow: rice that is carefully prepared through soaking and parboiling, at which point the water is drained and the rice is steamed. This method results in an exceptionally fluffy rice with the grains separated and not sticky; it also results in a golden rice crust at the bottom of the pot called tahdig (literally "bottom of the pot").
- Polow: rice that is cooked exactly the same as chelo, with the exception that after draining the rice, other ingredients are layered with the rice, and they are then steamed together.
- Kateh: rice that is boiled until the water is absorbed. This is the traditional dish of Northern Iran.
- Dami: Cooked almost the same as kateh, except that the heat is reduced just before boiling and a towel is placed between the lid and the pot to prevent steam from escaping. Dami literally means "simmered".

=== Japan ===
Japanese style Pilaf (ピラフ) is commonly eaten with Japanese school lunch, or kyūshoku (給食). Pilaf is also a key component of toruko rice.

=== Kenya ===
In Kenya pilau is mostly eaten in coastal regions. The spices are similar to Indian varieties. Potatoes are typically added to the masala and the dish can be eaten with meat, fish or meatless. It is often served with a side of kachumbari.

=== Pakistan ===
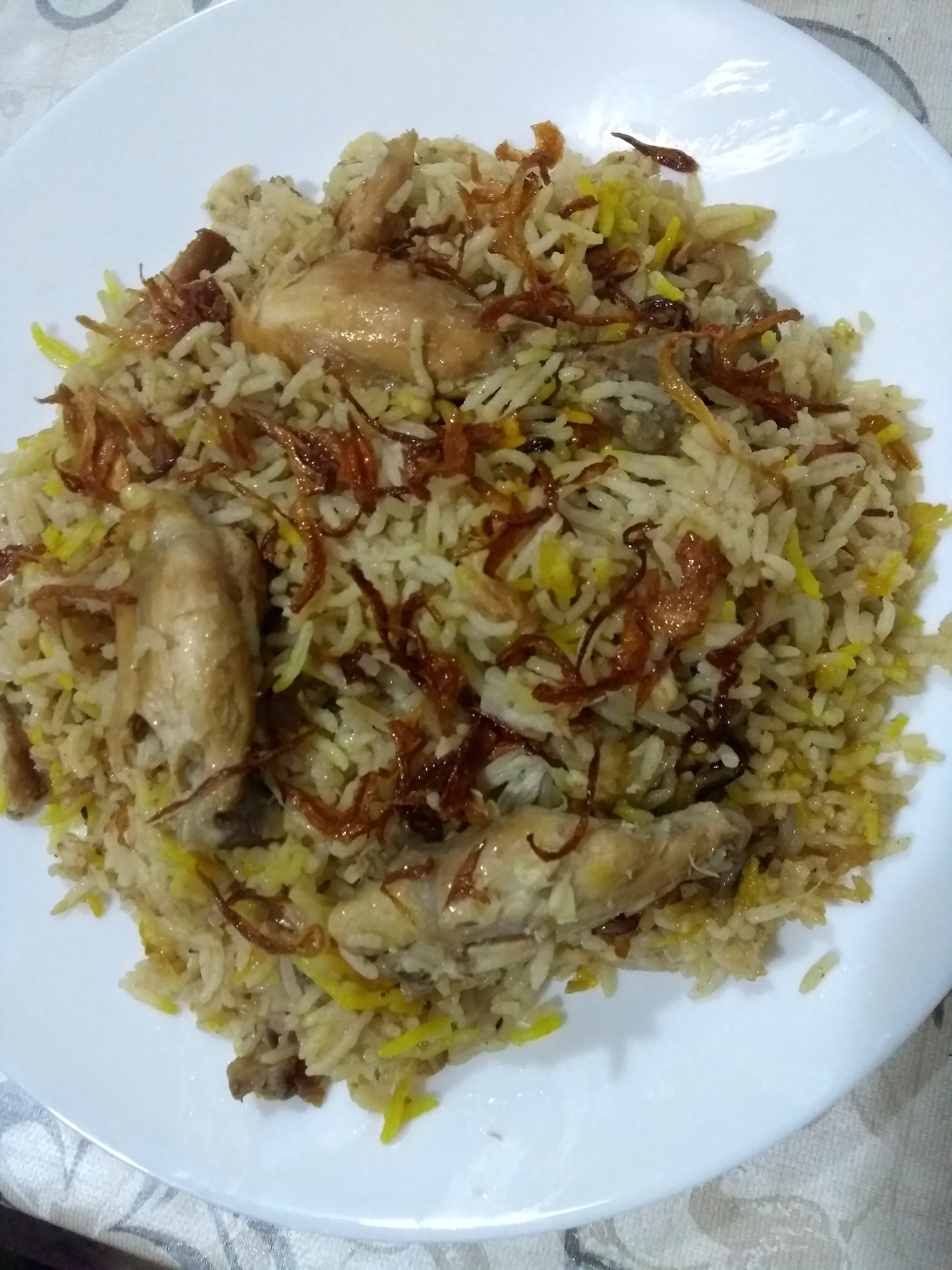
Zafrani chicken pulao, Karachi, Pakistan

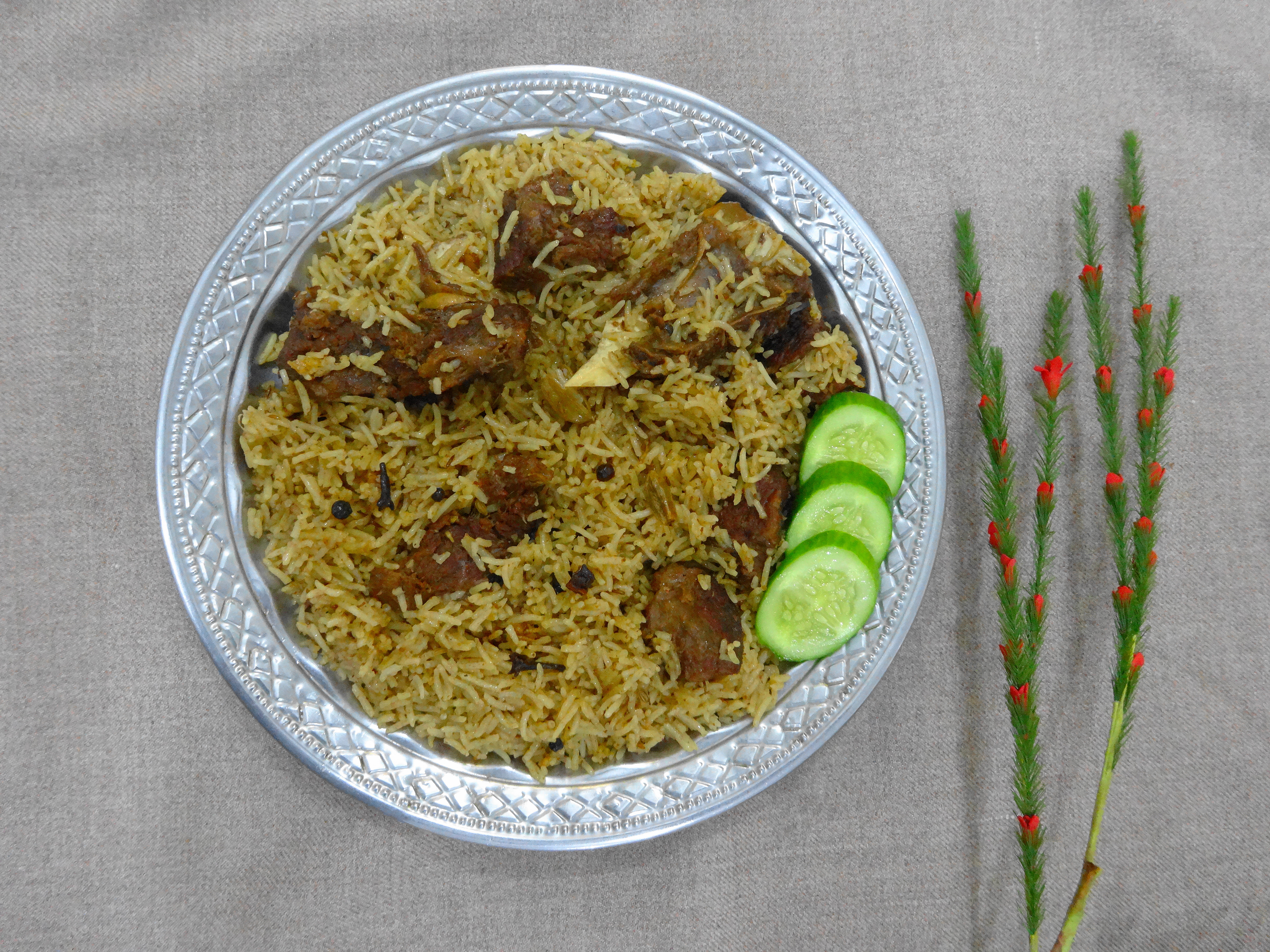
Camel meat pulao, Pakistan

In Pakistan, pulao (پلاؤ), also romanized as pulāv, is a popular dish made with fragrant basmati rice cooked in a seasoned meat or bone broth. Typically non-spicy, it features tender pieces of meat, such as chicken, lamb, or beef, though vegetarian variations are also popular. As with Afghan cuisine, Kabuli pulav is a staple dish in Pakistan, especially in the western regions. This variation of pulav is often adorned with sliced carrots, almonds, and raisins fried in a sweet syrup, adding a unique touch of sweetness and texture to the dish. Bannu Beef Pulao, also known as Bannu Gosht Pulao, is a traditional and popular variation of pulav recipe hailing from the Bannu district of the Khyber Pakhtunkhwa province in Pakistan. The dish is made with beef, basmati rice, and a blend of local spices, resulting in a flavor profile characteristic of the region. The beef is first cooked in a separate preparation known as Beef Yakhni, made using a combination of salt, ginger, garlic, onions, and garam masala. This broth enhances the flavor and ensures the meat is tender. The rice is then combined with the cooked beef, allowing the flavors to meld together. This delicacy is often served during special occasions and family dinners and is a staple of the Pashtun culinary tradition.

Pulao is popular in all parts of Pakistan, but the cooking style can vary slightly in other parts of the country. It is prepared by Sindhi people of Pakistan in their marriage ceremonies, condolence meetings, and other occasions.

=== Romania ===
Romanian style pilaf is often more watery in consistency, more akin to congee, and uses chicken breast meat along with chopped red peppers, onion, and carrot.

=== Levant ===
Traditional Levantine cooking includes a variety of Pilaf known as "Maqlubeh", known across the countries of the Eastern Mediterranean. The rice pilaf which is traditionally cooked with meat, eggplant, tomatoes, potatoes, and cauliflower also has a fish variety known as "sayadieh", or the Fishermen's Dish.

=== Turkey ===
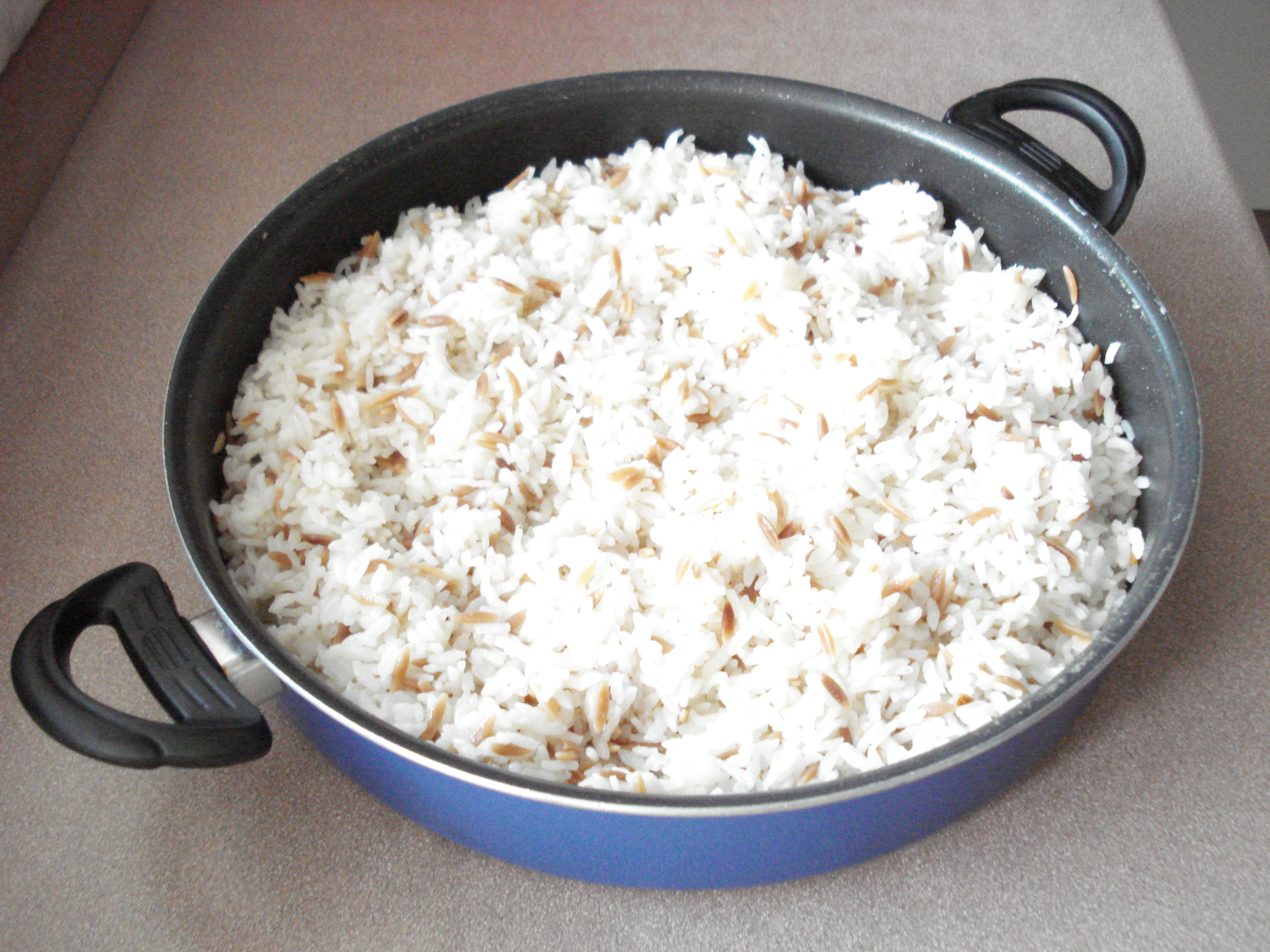
Typical Turkish pilav. Rice with orzo.

Historically, mutton stock was the most common cooking liquid for Turkish pilavs.

Turkish cuisine contains many different pilav types. Some of these variations are pirinç (rice) pilav, bulgur pilav, and arpa şehriye (orzo) pilav. Using mainly these three types, Turkish people make many dishes such as perdeli pilav, and etli pilav (rice cooked with cubed beef). Unlike Chinese rice, if Turkish rice is sticky, it is considered unsuccessful. To make the best rice according to Turkish people, one must rinse the rice, cook in butter, then add the water and let it sit until it soaks all the water. This results in a pilaf that is not sticky and every single rice grain falls off of the spoon separately.

The Greek Orthodox Pontian minority had their own methods of preparing pilav. Pontians along the Black Sea coast might make pilav with anchovies (called hapsipilavon) or mussels (called mythopilavon). Other varieties of Pontian pilav could include chicken, lamb, and vegetables. Typical seasonings are anise, dill, parsley, salt, pepper, and saffron. Some Pontians cooked pine nuts, peanuts, or almonds into their pilav. While pilav was usually made from rice, it could also be made with buckwheat.

=== Ukraine ===
Traditional Crimean Tatar pilyav (pilâv) is prepared from rice; meat, onions, or raisins can be added.

=== Baltics ===
Lithuanian pilaf is often referred to as plovas. It tends to consist of rice and vegetables; depending on the region the vegetables can be tomatoes, carrots, cabbage, and/or mushrooms. It often contains chicken pieces or cut-up pieces of pork, usually the meat around the neck or the stomach; seasonings can be heavy or light, and some plovas might be made with rice that is very soft, unlike other variants.

Latvian pilaf is often referred to as plovs or plov. It tends to contain the same ingredients as the Lithuanian plovas and can vary from county to county.

== See also ==
- List of rice dishes
- Bannu pulao
- Fried rice
- Maqluba
- Nasi lemak
- Nasi goreng

== Bibliography ==
- Achaya, K.T. (1994), Indian Food Tradition A Historical Companion, Oxford University Press India, p. 44, ISBN 978-0-19-562845-6.
- American Institute for Cancer Research (2005), The New American Plate Cookbook: Recipes for a Healthy Weight and a Healthy Life, University of California Press, pp. 158–, ISBN 978-0-520-24234-0.
- Boardman, John (2019), Alexander the Great: From His Death to the Present Day, Princeton University Press, ISBN 978-0-691-18175-2.
- Collingham, Elizabeth M. (2007), Curry: A Tale of Cooks and Conquerors, Oxford University Press, ISBN 978-0-19-532001-5.
- Davidson, Alan (2014), The Oxford Companion to Food, Oxford University Press, pp. 624–625, ISBN 978-0-19-967733-7.
- Kraig, Bruce (2013), The Oxford Encyclopedia of Food and Drink in America, Oxford University Press USA, p. 140, ISBN 978-0-19-973496-2.
- Marton, Renee (2014), Rice: A Global History, Reaktion Books, pp. 34–, ISBN 978-1-78023-412-0.
- Merriam-Webster Unabridged Dictionary (2019), pilaf noun, Merriam-Webster Incorporated Unabridged Dictionary; Online, Subscription Required.
- Nabhan, Gary Paul (2014), Cumin, Camels, and Caravans: A Spice Odyssey, Univ of California Press, ISBN 978-0-520-26720-6.
- Nandy, Ashis (2004), "The Changing Popular Culture of Indian Food: Preliminary Notes", South Asia Research, 24 (1): 9–19, doi:10.1177/0262728004042760, ISSN 0262-7280, S2CID 143223986.
- Oxford English Dictionary (2006a), pilaf (n), Oxford English Dictionary, 3rd edition, online (subscription required).
- Oxford English Dictionary (2006b), pilau (n), Oxford English Dictionary, 3rd edition, online (subscription required), ""A dish, partly of Middle Eastern, partly and ultimately of South Asian origin, consisting of rice (or, in certain areas, wheat) cooked in stock with spices, usually mixed with meat and various other ingredients."
- Perry, Charles (2014), "Pilaf", in Jaine, Tom (ed.), The Oxford Companion to Food by Alan Davidson, 3rd Edition, Oxford University Press, pp. 624–625, ISBN 978-0-19-967733-7.
- Perry, Charles (15 December 1994), "Annual Cookbook Issue: Book Review: An Armchair Guide to the Indian Table: Indian Food: A Historical Companion By K. T. Achaya (Oxford University Press: 1994; $35; 290 pp.)", Los Angeles Times.
- Perry, Charles (28 April 1994), "Rice Pilaf: Ingredients, Texture Varies", Los Angeles Times.
- Rasanayagam, C. (1984) [1926], Ancient Jaffna: Being a Research Into the History of Jaffna from Very Early Times to the Portug[u]ese Period, Everyman's Publisher (Madras), pp. 153–4, ISBN 978-81-206-0210-6.
- Roger, Delphine (2000), "The Middle East and South Asia (in Chapter: History and Culture of Food and Drink in Asia)", in Kiple, Kenneth F.; Ornelas, Kriemhild Coneè (eds.), The Cambridge World History of Food, vol. 2, Cambridge and New York: Cambridge University Press, pp. 1140–1150, ISBN 978-0-521-40215-6.
- Sen, Colleen Taylor (2014), Feasts and Fasts: A History of Food in India, Reaktion Books, pp. 164–5, ISBN 978-1-78023-391-8.
- Sengupta, Jayanta (2014), "India", in Freedman, Paul; Chaplin, Joyce E.; Albala, Ken (eds.), Food in Time and Place: The American Historical Association Companion to Food History, Univ of California Press, pp. 68–94, ISBN 978-0-520-27745-8.
