= Yahni =

Class of stews, broths, and stocks

Yakhni
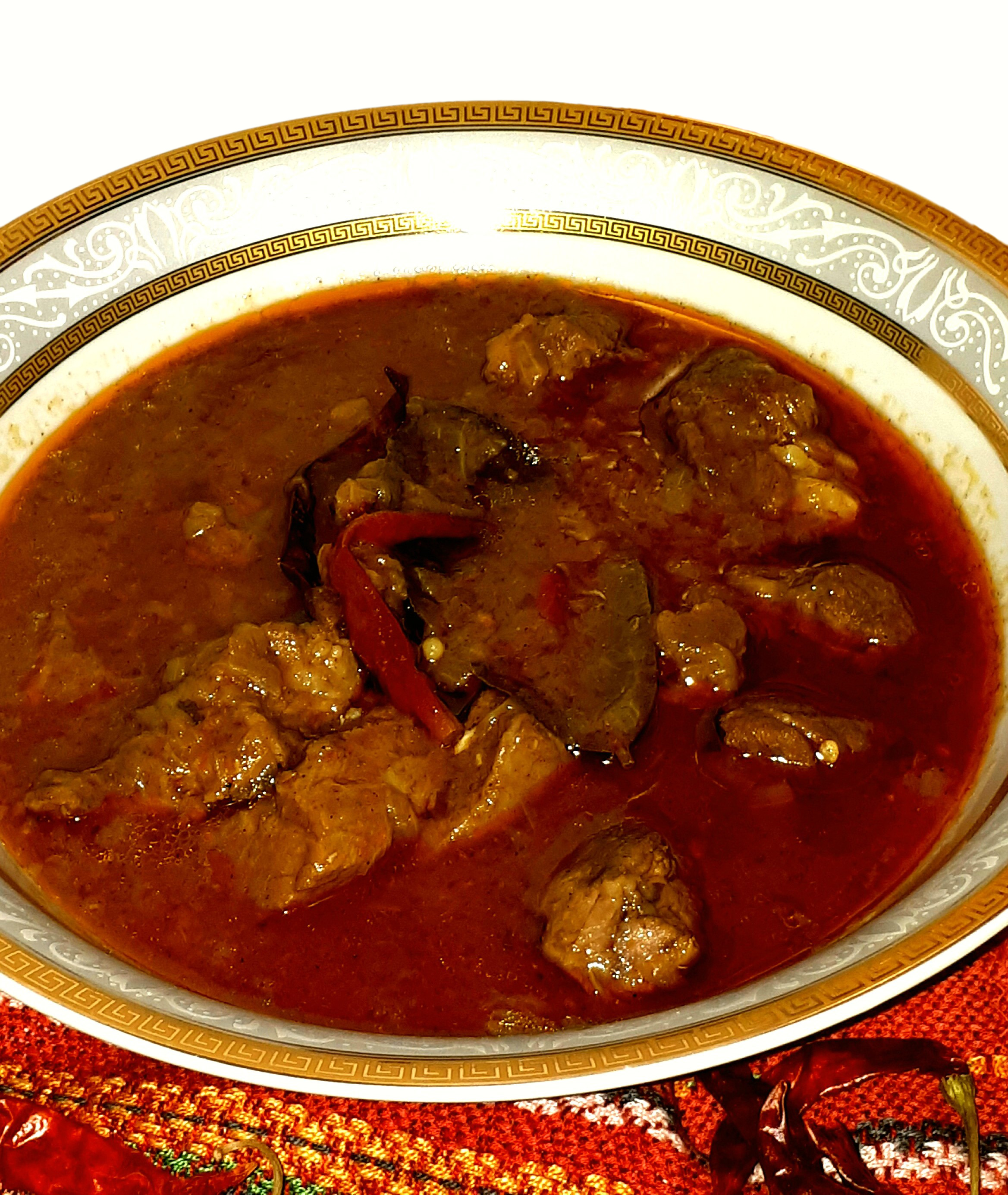
- Beef yahnia in North Macedonia
- Alternative names: Yahni, yahnia, jahni, yakhna, yakhnia, iahnie
- Type: Stew, stock, or broth
- Main ingredients: lamb meat, mutton meat, etc. (varies by region)

Yakhni (Persian: یخنی, Arabic: يخني, Urdu: یخنی, Hindi: यख़नी, Greek: γιαχνί), yahni (Turkish), or yahniya (Bulgarian: яхния, Serbian, Macedonian: јанија), jahni (Albanian), iahnie (Romanian) is a class of dishes traditionally prepared in a vast area encompassing South Asia, the Middle East and the Balkans. Generally, it is a stew of meat and vegetables.

== History ==
A meat stew named yakhni originated in Medieval Iranian cuisine. The name derives from the covered clay pot in which it was originally cooked. The meaning of the Persian word is "store of food". Different varieties of this dish later spread eastwards to Afghanistan, Uzbekistan and much later to South Asia and westwards to the Ottoman Empire reaching the Levant, Egypt, Libya, and the Balkans.

== Etymology ==
The word yakhni (Ottoman Turkish: یخنی) was borrowed into Ottoman Turkish from Farsi. Lexicographer James Redhouse defined the word in his 1890 English-Ottoman Turkish as a "stew of fish or meat". The Arabic yakhni (Arabic: يخني) was loaned from Turkish.

== Varieties ==
In Iranian cuisine, yakhni is a meat stew akin to khoresh, while yakhni-polow is a pilaf cooked in a stew.

In Arab, Albanian, Greek, and Turkish cuisines, it is a stew of meat, fish, or vegetables in a browned-onion base with tomatoes and olive oil. Garlic and spices are a common addition in some cuisines. In Bulgarian cuisine and Romanian cuisine, sunflower oil is used instead of olive oil.

In the Arab World, yakhni typically accompanies rice or bulgur. Gazan yakhni is traditionally served with maftoul.

In the northern Indian subcontinent, yakhni refers to stock or broth of beef, chicken, lamb or mutton. It is touted for its health benefits and is often the base for many foods including pulao (a pilaf) and other shorbas (soups). In Kashmiri cuisine, yakhni is a light, yogurt-based meat dish, usually made with mutton or chicken. Flavored with fennel, ginger, and cardamom. It is commonly served with rice.

In Bangladesh, akhni is a mixed rice dish and variant of the biryani and polao dishes.

A version of the dish is also part of the Romani cuisine.

In Romanian cuisine, the term iahnie de fasole refers to a style of baked beans, often cooked or served with smoked meat and sausages (fasole cu cârnați).

Fasoulia yakhni is a stew of olive oil, green beans, tomatoes, and onions that may contain meat, it is common in the Balkans and the middle east, Lebanese fasoulia yakhni is made with white beans.

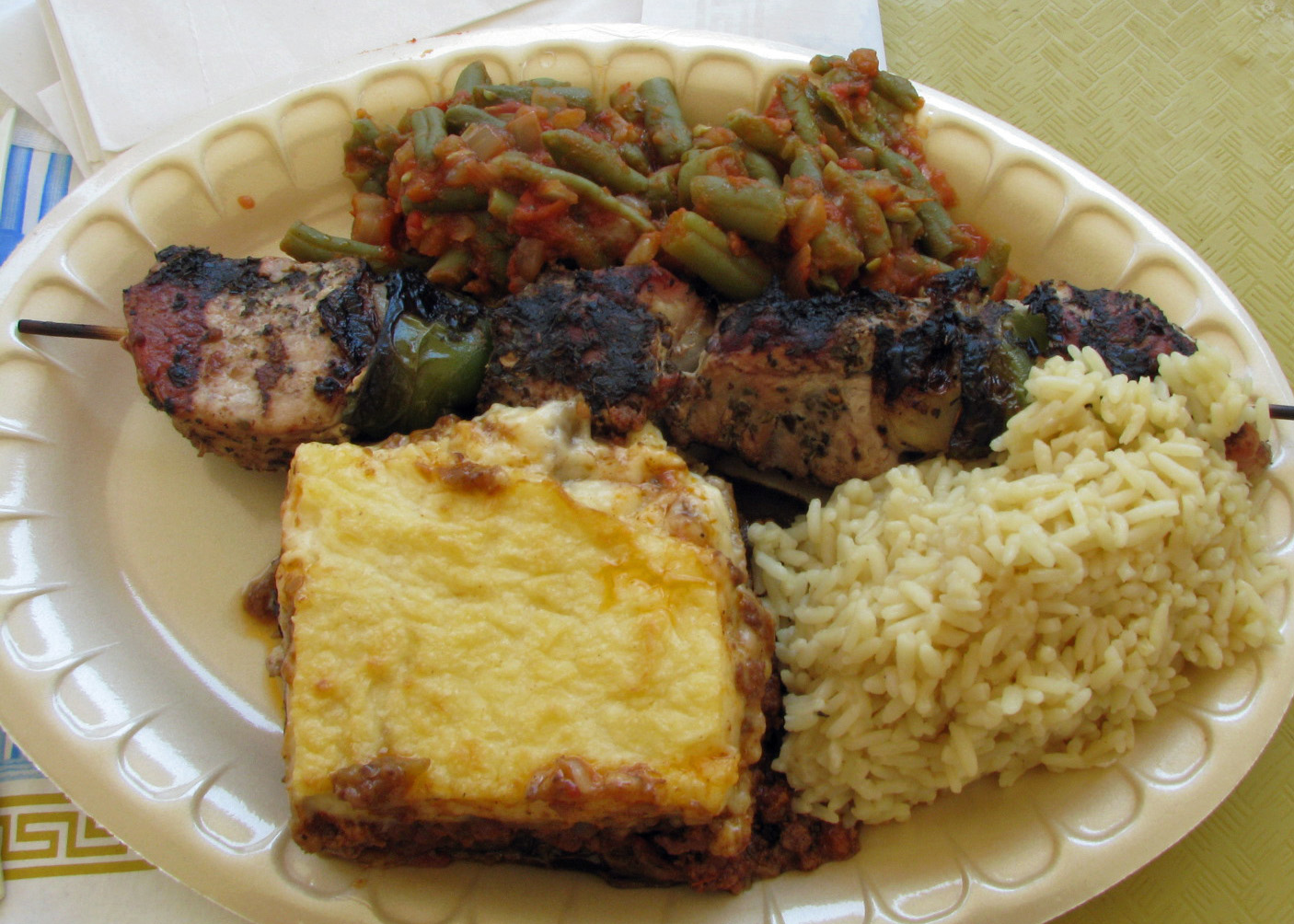
Plate of Greek food: yakhni at top center, with pork souvlaki below, mousaka (bottom left) and rice pilaf (bottom right)

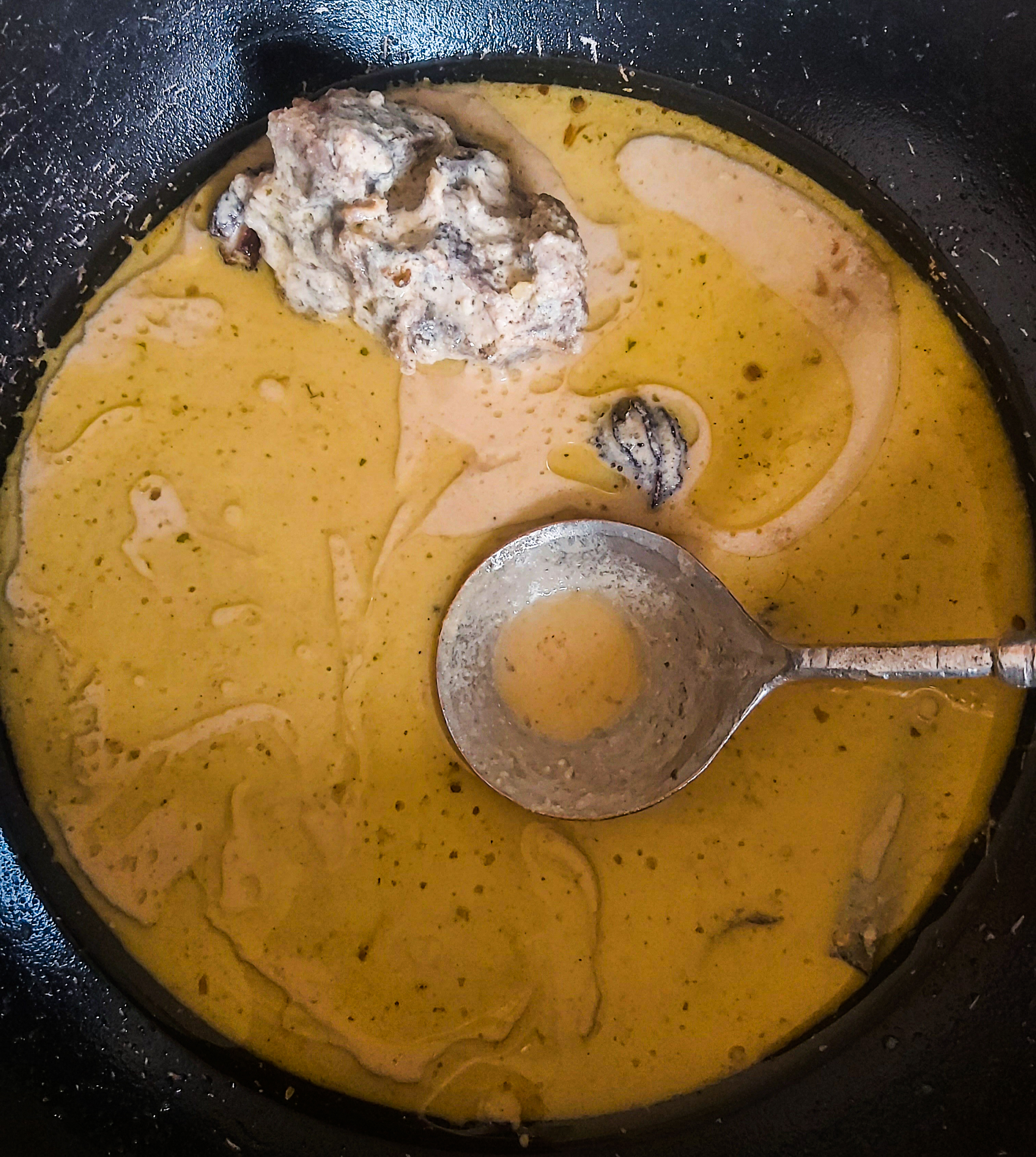
Yakhni from Kashmir

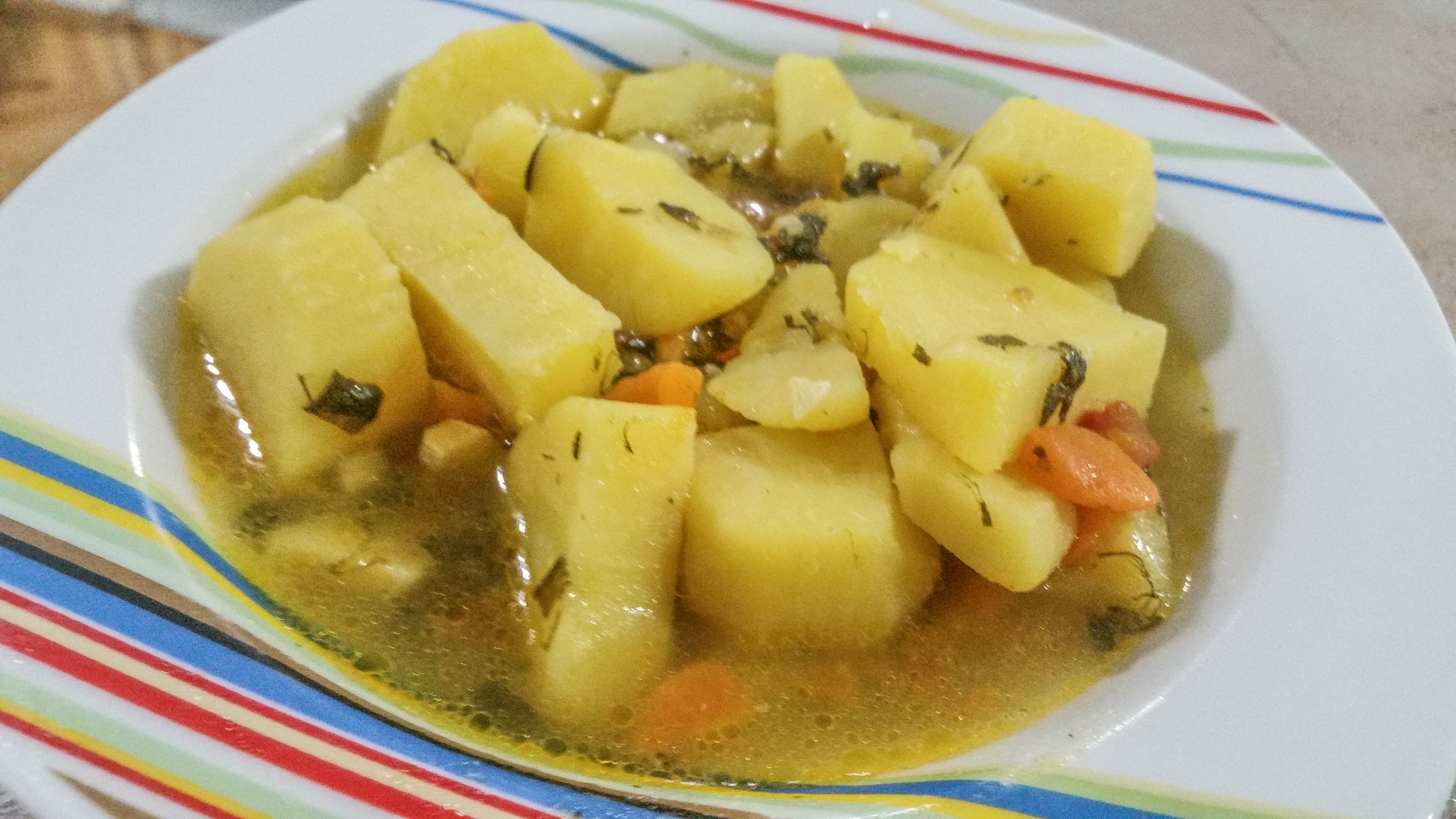
Potato yahnia

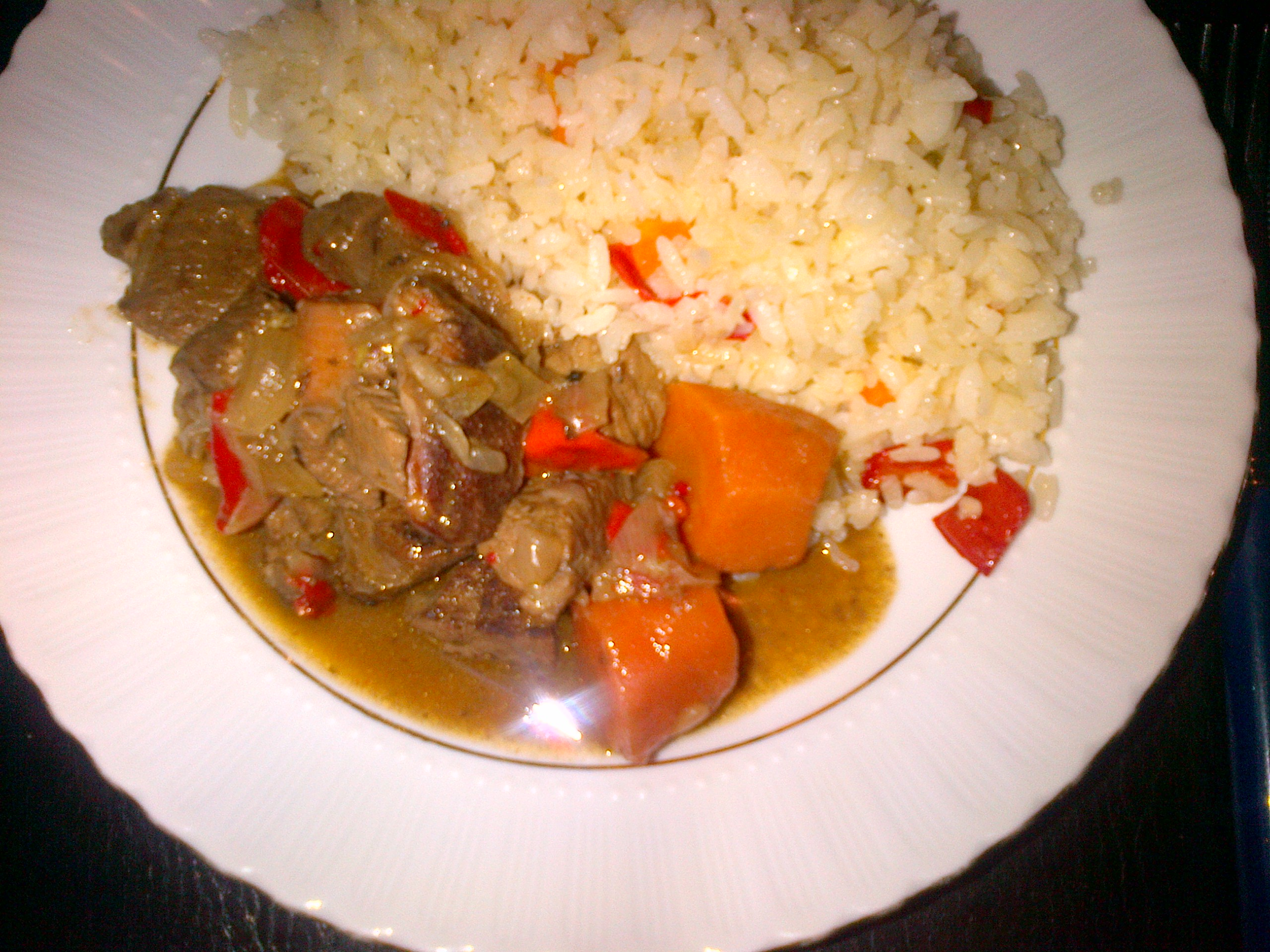
Veal yahni served with rice

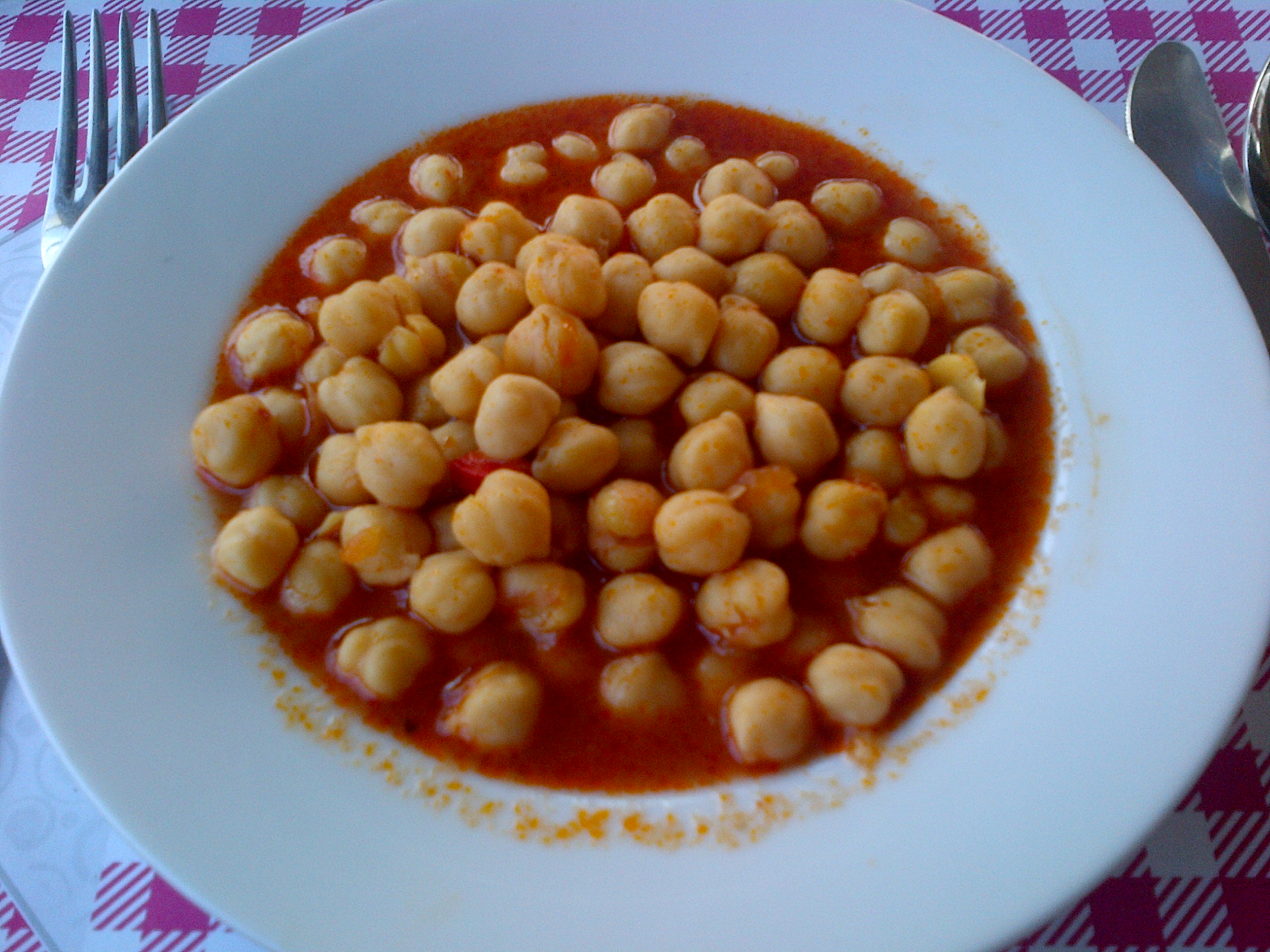
Turkish chickpea yahni

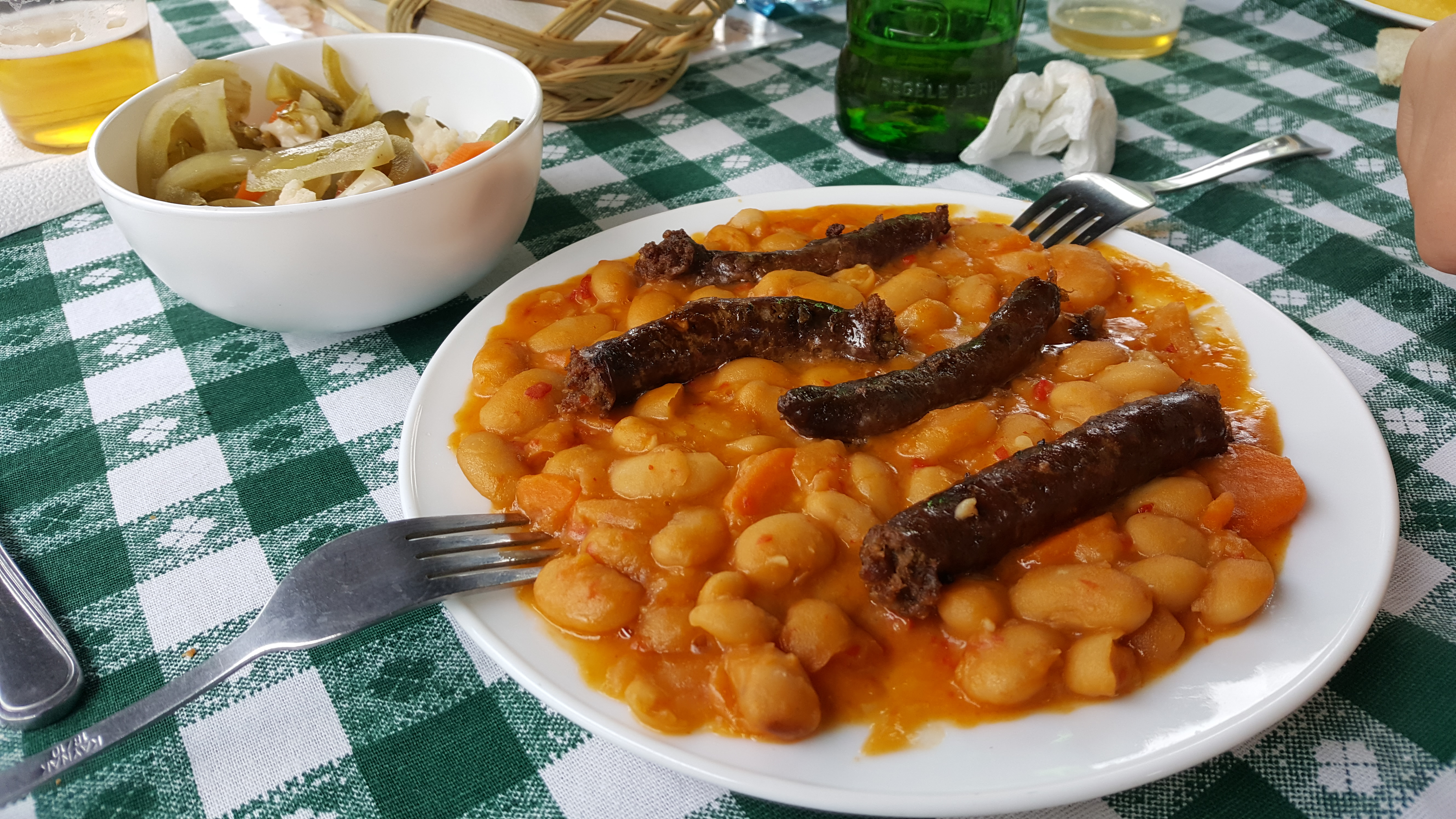
Romanian bean yahni served with sausages

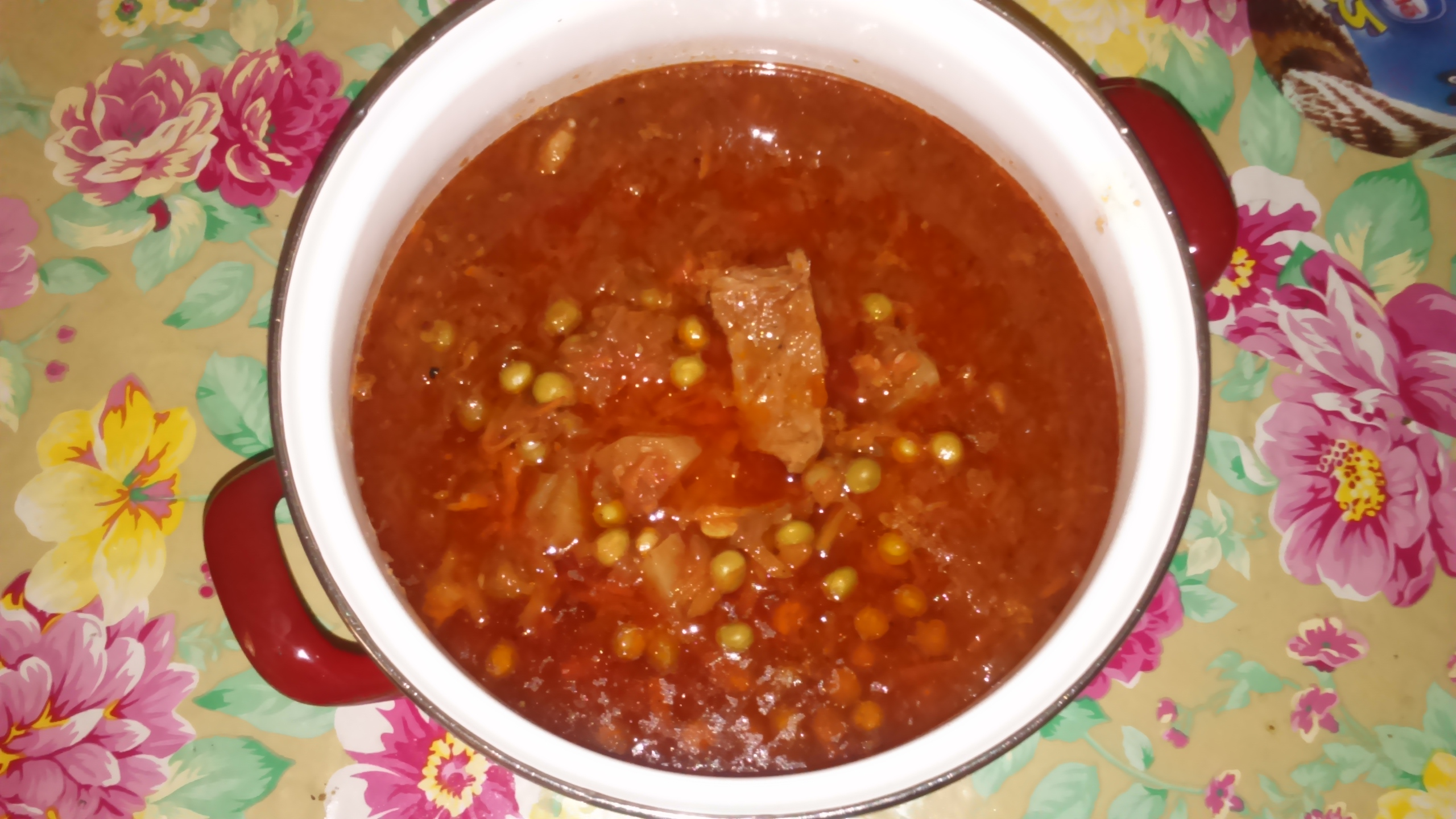
Egyptian fasoulia yakhni with meat and potatoes.
