= Akhni =

Memon/Bengali rice dish

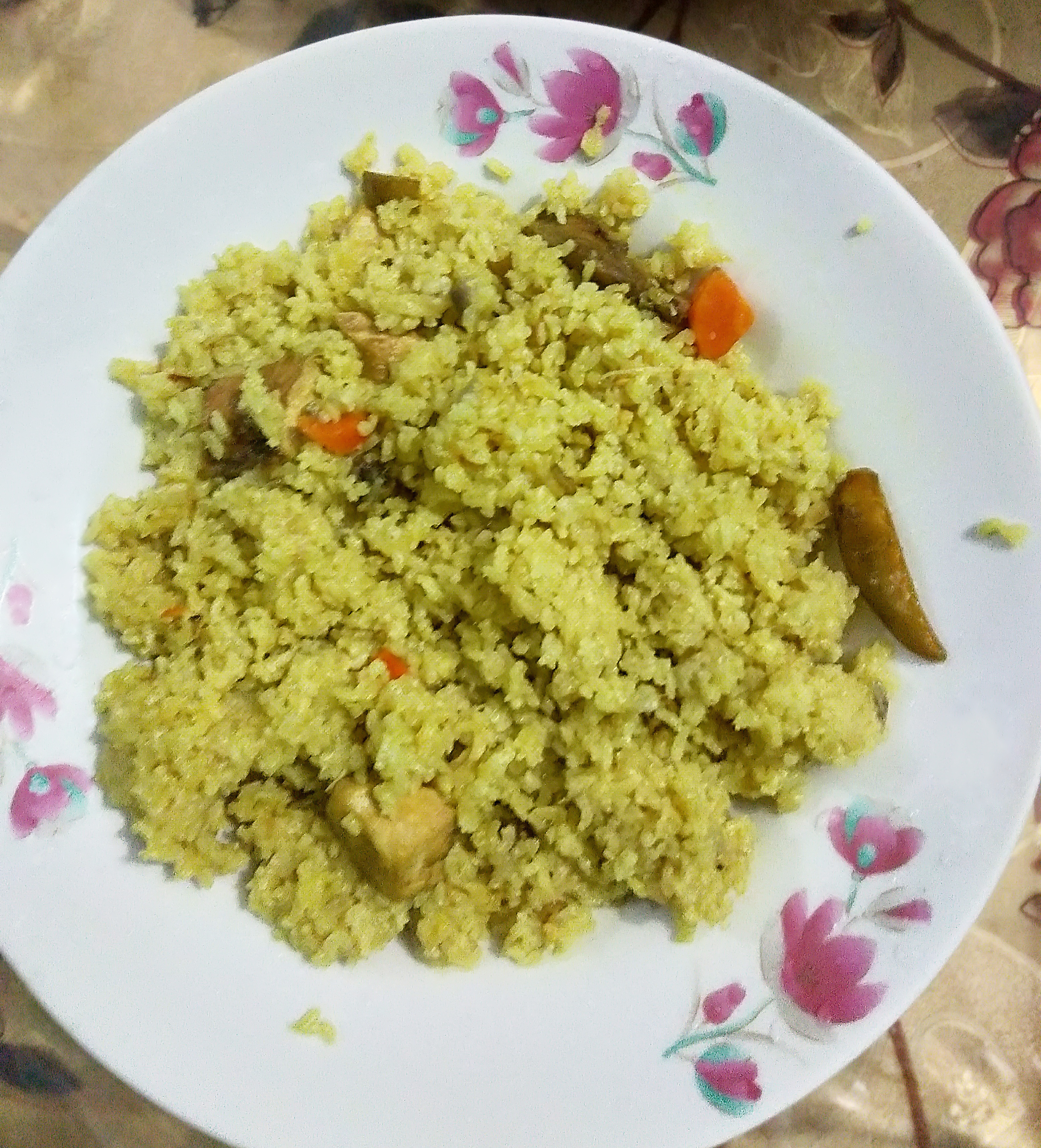
- Chicken akhni
- Course: Main dish
- Region or state: Chittagong and Sylhet
- Main ingredients: Rice, Bangladeshi spices, meat, vegetables (such as carrots and potatoes), dahi
- Ingredients generally used: Nuts, eggs
- Similar dishes: Biryani, polao

Akhni (Bengali: আখনী) is a mixed rice dish with its origins among the Bengali Muslims of Chittagong and Sylhet, in eastern Bangladesh. It is often considered to be a particular variation of biryani or polao. The dish is especially popular in restaurants throughout Bangladesh, as well as among the diaspora across the world. The dish is a staple in Chittagong, where it is said to be consumed every week by the average Chittagonian person. During Ramadan, the Islamic month of fasting, the dish is popularly eaten at Iftar meals across Sylhet too.

== Etymology ==
The word 'akhni' is derived from the Arabic term, yakhni, which means stew.

== Ingredients ==
It is made by mixing rice with cooking oil, traditional spices (ginger, garlic, garam masala, tejpata, cumin, onion, salt), ghee, meat (chicken, beef, goat, lamb), fruits and vegetables (carrots, potatoes, peas, plums), chili pepper and sour doi. Occasionally, nuts and eggs may also be added.

== See also ==
- List of rice dishes
