= Pakistani cuisine =

Culinary traditions of Pakistan

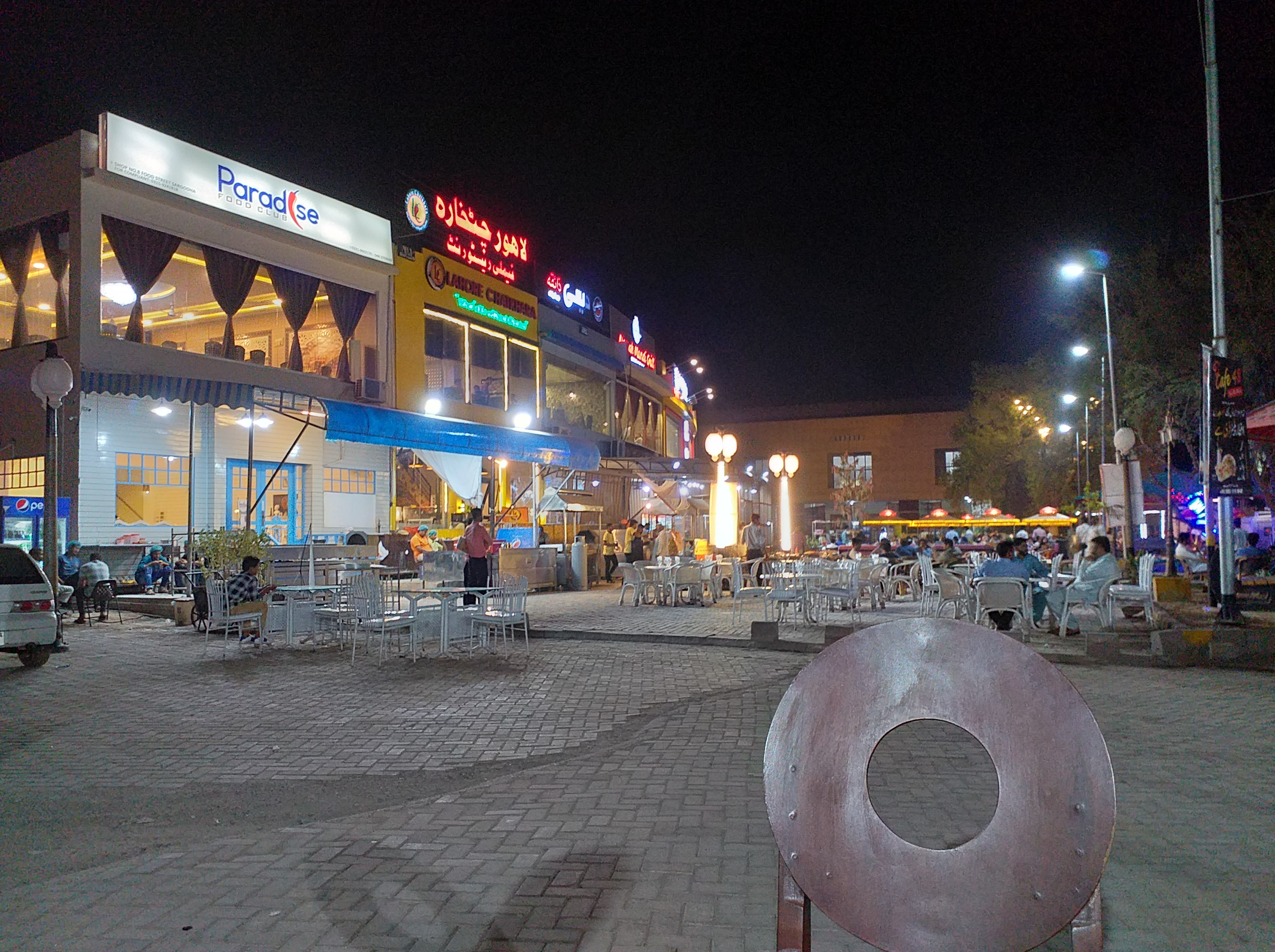
Food street located on Stadium Road, Sargodha.

Pakistani cuisine (Urdu: پاکستانی پکوان, romanized: pākistānī pakwān) encompasses the traditional and regional foods of Pakistan and its diaspora, Central and West Asia. Pakistan's ethnic and cultural diversity, diverse climates, geographical environments, and availability of different produce lead to diverse regional cuisines. The diet of most Pakistanis revolves around rice-based dishes, while various forms of naan are consumed with most meals. Tea is generally consumed daily in large quantities, and is a major part of hospitality.

Pakistani cuisine, like the culinary traditions of most Muslim-majority nations, adheres to halal principles in accordance with Islamic dietary laws, which prohibit the consumption of pork and alcohol, among other restrictions. Additionally, halal regulations outline specific guidelines for meat consumption, including which animals are considered permissible (halal) and the proper methods of slaughter and preparation to ensure compliance with Islamic dietary practices.

Pakistani cuisine is traditionally centered around meat-based dishes. However, the high cost of meat, coupled with widespread poverty, leads many households to substitute meat with more affordable staples such as lentils, rice, and vegetables.

Eating out has always been common in cities. Fast food is gaining popularity and many major foreign fast-food chains have opened all over Pakistan, where local and foreign recipes often merge to create fusion dishes, such as Pakistani-Chinese cuisine. Additionally, as a result of lifestyle changes, health trends, and new dietary research being published, traditional ingredients such as masala (pre-mixed and ready-to-use) and ghee (clarified butter)—with its health benefits and high smoke point—have been increasingly popular.

== Historical influences ==
Pakistan's national cuisine directly inherits from Indo-Aryan, Turko-Persian, Iranic, and Arab, and it is heavily influenced by Muslim culinary practices. Evidence of controlled preparatory cuisine in the region can be traced back to as early as the Bronze Age with the Indus Valley Civilization. Around 3000 BCE, sesame, eggplant, and humped cattle were domesticated in the Indus Valley; spices like turmeric, cardamom, black pepper and mustard were harvested in the region concurrently. For a thousand years, wheat and rice served as basic comestibles in the Indus Valley region.

The arrival of Islam through trade and conquests by various Arab, Turkic, Persian, and Afghan dynasties influenced the local cuisine of the region to a great degree. Due to its Muslim-majority population, Pakistan's cuisine sees a strict observance of Islamic dietary laws. Most prominently, forbiddance on the consumption of pork and alcohol by Islamic regulation has shifted the focus of Pakistani cuisine to other types of meat, such as beef, lamb, chicken, and fish, alongside a variety of fruits, vegetables, and dairy.

The Portuguese and British during their rule introduced cooking techniques such as baking, and foods from the New World and Europe. The new-world vegetables popular in Pakistani cuisine include maize, tomato, potato, sweet potatoes, peanuts, squash,chilli and fruit such as guava, pineapple, custard apple, and sapidilla. Cauliflower was introduced by the British in the region in 1822.

== Elements ==
Pakistani dishes are known for being aromatic. Some dishes contain liberal amounts of oil, contributing to a richer, fuller mouthfeel and flavour. Brown cardamom, green cardamom, cinnamon, cloves, nutmeg, mace, star anise and black pepper are the most commonly used spices in the making of a wide variety of dishes throughout Pakistan. Cumin seeds, chili powder, turmeric, and bay leaves are also very popular. In the Punjab province, spice blends are characterized by their use of coriander powder. Garam masala (a mixture of aromatic spices) is a popular blend of spices used in several Pakistani dishes including Bannu Pulao.

== Regional cuisines ==
=== Balochistan ===
Balochi cuisine originates from Pakistan's Balochistan region, yet many of its dishes have gained nationwide acclaim. Among the most popular Balochi dishes are Balochi sajji (skewered lamb or chicken stuffed with rice), mutton rosh (mutton chops) and dampukht (meat slow-cooked in its own fats). Influenced by Iranian culinary traditions, Balochi cuisine is known for its aromatic character while being non-spicy.

=== Khyber Pakhtunkhwa ===
The culinary traditions of Khyber Pakhtunkhwa are deeply rooted in Pashtun or Afghan culture and are heavily influenced by Iranic culinary traditions. Pashtun cuisine is characterized by a preference for rice-based dishes, kebabs, and lamb. Prominent dishes include Kabuli palaw, a flavorful rice dish with meat, carrots, and dried fruits; bannu pulao, a beef and stock-based rice dish; chapli kabab, a spiced and crispy minced meat patty; tika, marinated and grilled meat skewers; and mutton karahi, a savory, rich stew. Local variations such as Peshawari cuisine further showcase the diverse culinary practices of the region. Like Balochi cuisine, Pashtun cuisine is traditionally non-spicy. In recent years, rosh has taken traction with locals who enjoy the Balochi dish.

==== Chitrali ====
The cuisine of the Chitrali people is influenced by their geography and location. Common dishes are soups such as kalli, flatbread variants such as ghalmandi, and traditional juices such as chamborogh (made with dried apricots). The traditional cuisine of Chitral relies heavily on cottage cheese, bread, maize, broth, and noodles.

==== Kalash ====
Kalash people have a rich food culture that includes various types of breads and cheese. Some of the widely consumed breads are bilili (walnut bread), jã'u, (walnut bread), and kurau (flour kindled in crushed grape juice). They are made with flour and different types of nuts.

=== Punjab ===
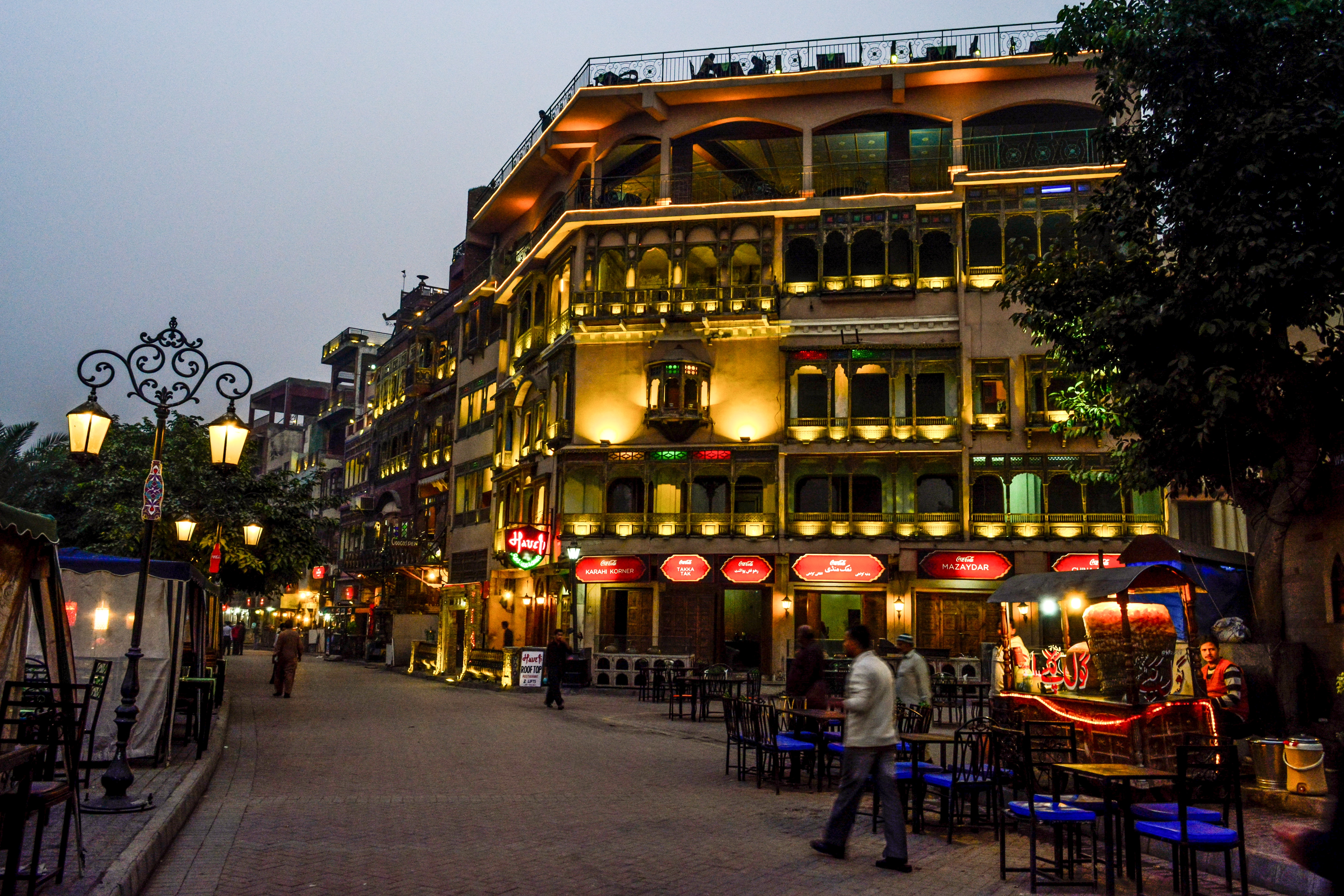
Night view of Lahore's Food Street.

The Punjab province is home to various ethnic groups, resulting in variations in cuisine across the region. Despite these differences, many dishes from Punjab have gained popularity across the region and throughout Pakistan.

Northern Punjab, situated in the Potohar Plateau, is known for dishes such as kunna gosht (mutton slow-cooked in a clay pot), hareesa (a smooth blend of wheat, lentils, and meat), and kofta curry (spiced meatballs in a savory gravy), often eaten with soft, sesame-topped roghni naan.

In Central and Eastern Punjab, signature dishes include murgh/mutton/beef pulao, a fragrant rice dish cooked with spices and meat; saag, a mustard leaf-based dish traditionally cooked on low heat in pure ghee paired with makai roti (maize flour flatbread); paye/kharoray, a slow-cooked stew made from the legs and joints of cow, goat, buffalo, or sheep; murgh cholay, a flavorful curry of chicken and chickpeas often served with roghni naan; and lassi, a refreshing yogurt-based drink. Additionally, dishes such as nihari (a slow-cooked meat stew), haleem (a rich porridge of wheat, lentils, and meat), and karahi gosht (a spicy curry cooked in a wok-like vessel) are staples. The food in this region is traditionally moderately spicy.

==== Saraiki ====
Saraiki cuisine refers to the native cuisine of the Saraiki people from the Saraiki regions of Pakistan, including southern Punjab, northern Sindh, and Eastern Balochistan. Saraiki cuisine is known for its flavorful dishes, often incorporating a variety of spices and ingredients. Key dishes include sohbat, corn on the cob (makai da sitta), murgh cholay, kunna gosht, Saraiki sajji, Cholistani pulao, and moringa flowerbud curry (locally known as sohanjrra'n). Common desserts include multani halwa and phikka khoya.

=== Sindh ===
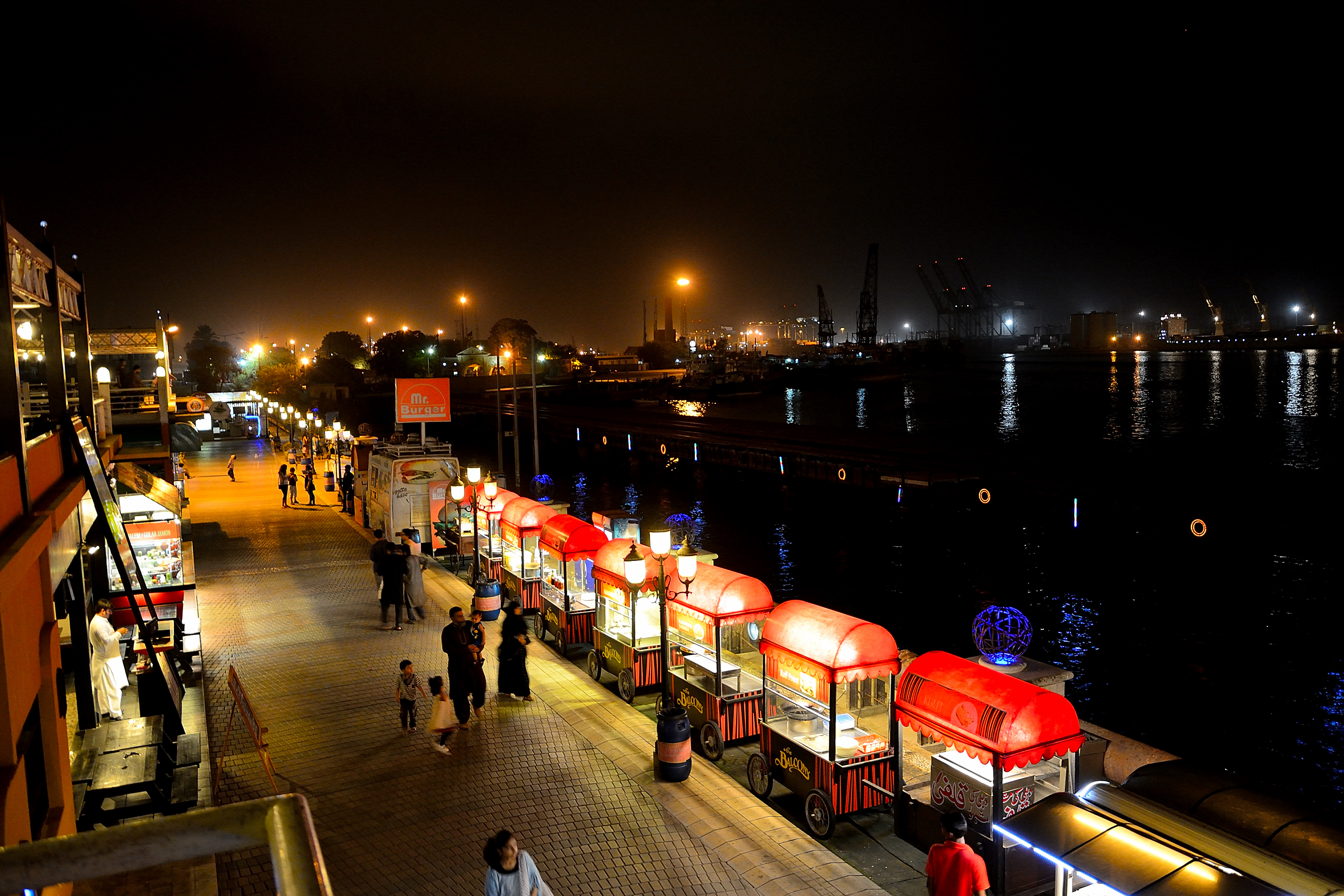
Located on the bank of the Arabian Sea in Karachi, Port Grand is one of the largest food streets of Asia.

Sindhi cuisine refers to the traditional culinary practices of the Sindhi people from the Sindh province of Pakistan. Like most Pakistani culinary traditions, it is predominantly meat-based, with chicken and mutton forming the cornerstone of most meals. Signature dishes of the Sindhi people include Sindhi biryani, karhi, daal pakwan, palo fish, and bhugal gosht. Sindhi cuisine is typically not spicy, focusing on aromatic and balanced flavors. In contrast, the cuisine of Karachi, the capital of Sindh, reflects the influence of its Muhajir (Indian immigrant) population, which constitutes a significant portion of the city’s residents along with other communities in the city which further contribute to Karachi’s diverse cuisine. Karachi’s food is known for its bold and spicy flavors.

=== Gilgit-Baltistan ===
Gilgit Baltistan includes many different dishes and Gilgit Baltistan has their cultural dish that symbolizes the people.

Gilgiti cuisine is the cuisine of Gilgit-Baltistan, Pakistan. It is typically non-spicy, but rich in flavors. Prominent Gilgiti dishes, such as the Chapshoro have gained massive popularity among different parts of Pakistan. Mumtu (dumplings) is another popular dish, often served with yogurt and parsley and black pepper, vinegar, chili sauce.

==== Hunza ====
Staple foods like barley, wheat, and millet form the foundation of dishes such as chapshuro and thukpa, hearty soups that provide warmth in the cold climate. Fresh fruits like apricots and cherries are transformed into jams, dried fruits, and juices, while dairy products like yogurt and cheese play a significant role in both savory and sweet offerings. Dishes like buckwheat bread, rosehip oil bread, and almond bread are commonly prepared in Hunza.

==== Nagar ====
Chapshuro is the local alternative of pizza in Nagar. Initially a local product of only Nagar valley, now it is widely prepared in Hunza and other localitises on the Karakoram.

==== Ghizer ====
Ghizer is famous for kelawo (also spelled kilao), walnuts dipped in honey and mulberry juice.

==== Gilgit ====
Dumplings locally called mumtu are well known in Gilgit cuisine. As Gilgit itself is a blend of cultures from neighboring districts like Hunza, Ghizer and Chilas, the cuisines of these regions is also widely found here.

=== Azad Jammu and Kashmir ===
Azad Jammu and Kashmir cuisine refers to the traditional food culture of the people of Azad Jammu and Kashmir, combining both Kashmiri and Pahari culinary traditions. Known for its rich, aromatic flavors while being mild to moderately spiced, the cuisine relies heavily on rice, meat, yogurt, and local flatbreads. Key dishes include rogan josh, yakhni, goshtaba, rista, Pahari-style mutton curry, dum aloo, and bakarkhani. Famous beverages from the region include Kashmiri chai (noon chai), a pink salted tea, and kahwa, a saffron and cardamom-infused green

== Main courses ==
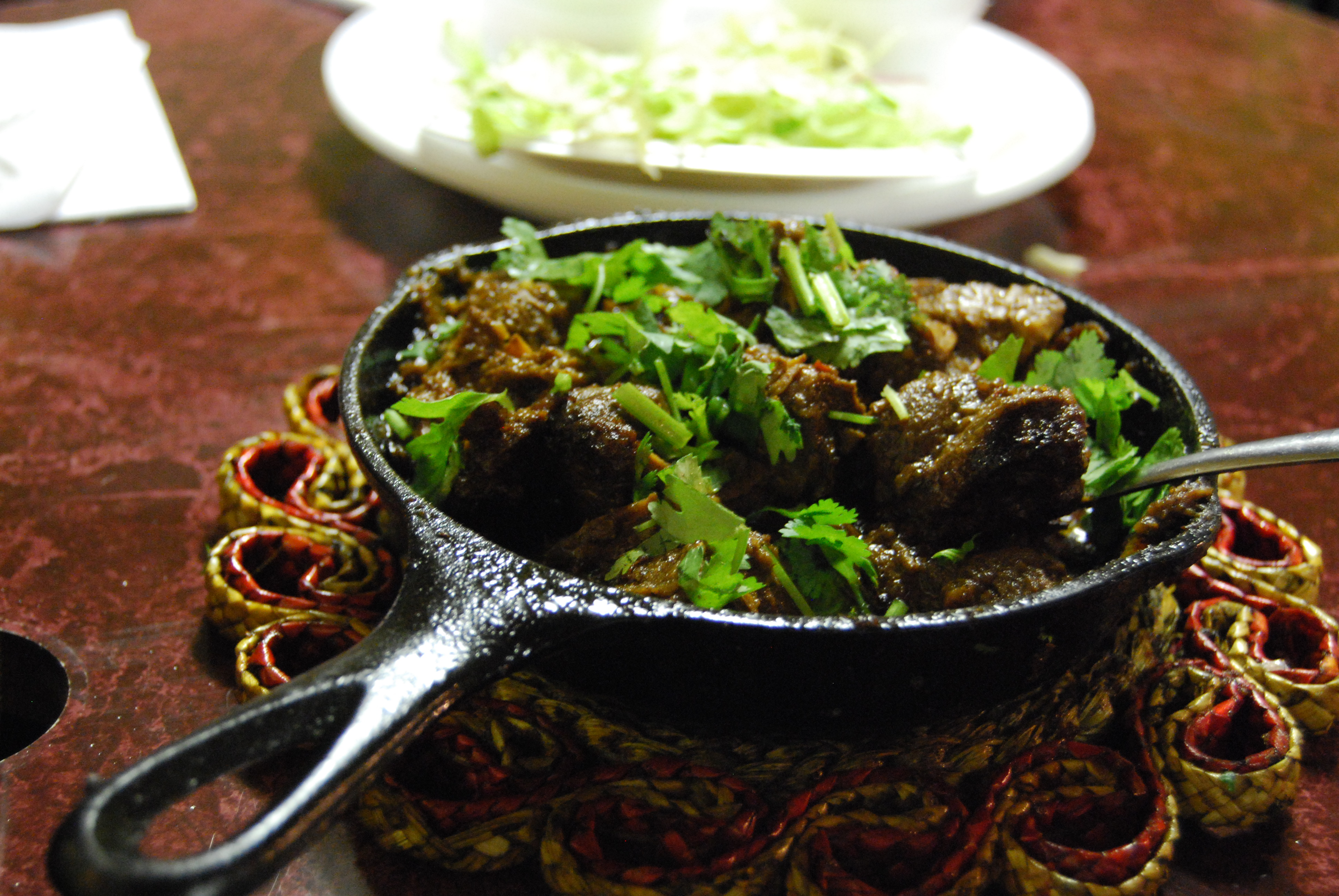
Lahori Beef Karahi, usually served with freshly made tandoori naan

In Pakistan, main courses are usually served with wheat bread (either roti or naan) or rice. Salad is generally taken as a side dish with the main course, rather than as an appetizer beforehand.

Meat plays a much more dominant role in Pakistani food, compared to other South Asian cuisines. Of all the meats, the most popular are goat, lamb and mutton, beef and chicken, which are particularly sought after as the meats of choice for kebab dishes or the classic beef shank dish nihari. Seafood is generally not consumed in large amounts, though it is very popular in the coastal areas of Sindh and the Makran coast of Balochistan and was a dominant element of the cuisine of the former East Pakistan (now Bangladesh).

Dishes, with or without meat, combined with local vegetables, such as bitter gourd, cauliflower, eggplant, okra, cabbage, potatoes, rutabaga, saag, and chili peppers are most common and cooked for everyday consumption. A typical example is aloo gosht (literally "potatoes and meat"), a homestyle recipe consisting of a spiced meat and potato stew, prepared in many households. Korma is a classic dish of Mughlai origin made of either chicken or mutton, typically eaten with naan or other bread, and is very popular in Pakistan.

== Vegetable and legume dishes ==
There are plenty of vegetarian-friendly vegetable and legume dishes popular in Pakistan. These are often cooked using traditional spices and flavoring agents such as chilis, turmeric, garlic, ginger, cumin, cloves, cinnamon, and fennel seeds. Dishes such as baingan bartha and sarson da saag are typical examples eaten in most homes. Aloo mutter is made with potatoes and peas.

There are plenty of vegetables which are grown seasonally in Pakistan, which are cooked into curries which are eaten for lunch or dinner. Some vegetable dishes, such as aloo paratha and channa puri, are also consumed for breakfast.

== Meat dishes ==
The meat dishes in Pakistan include beef, mutton, poultry and seafood dishes. Chicken karahi is a famous poultry dish. The meat is usually cut in 3 cm cubes and cooked in a stew. Minced meat is used for kebabs, qeema, and other dishes. Meat dishes may also be cooked with pulses, legumes and rice. The meat of the camel, rabbit, and many birds like Aari (Fulica atra), Kunj (Demoiselle crane), Titar (Grey francolin), Jhirkri (sparrow), is also consumed.

=== Barbecue and kebabs ===
Meat and grilled meat have played an important role in Pakistan for centuries. Kebabs are a staple item in Pakistani cuisine today, and one can find countless varieties all over the country. Each region has its own varieties, but some, like seekh kebab, chicken tikka, and shami kebab are eaten throughout the country.

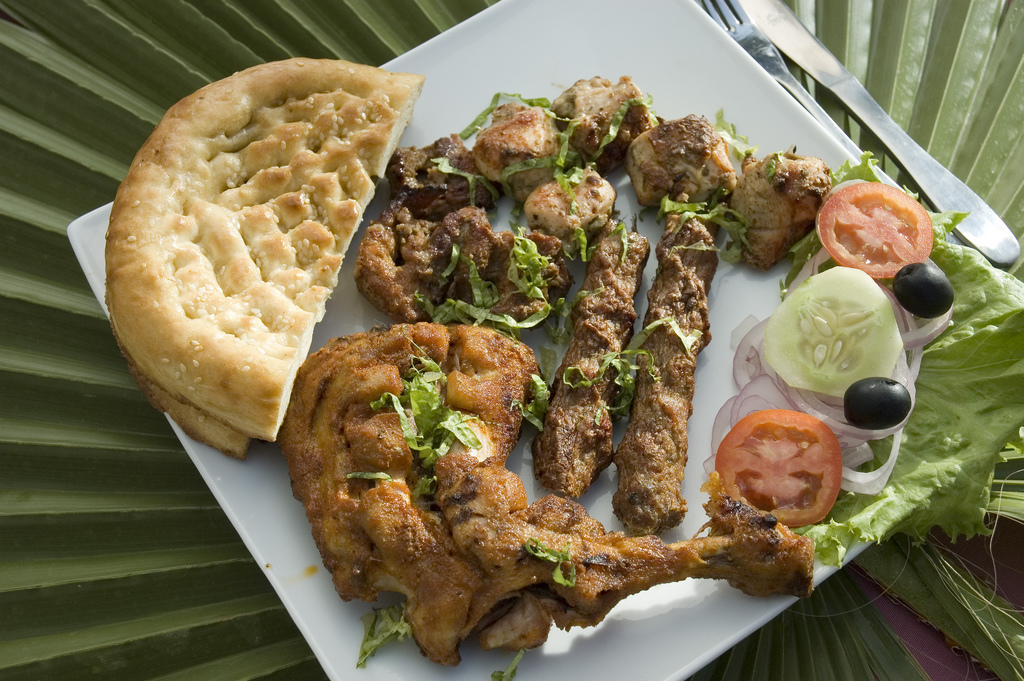
A variety of dishes cooked by barbecuing

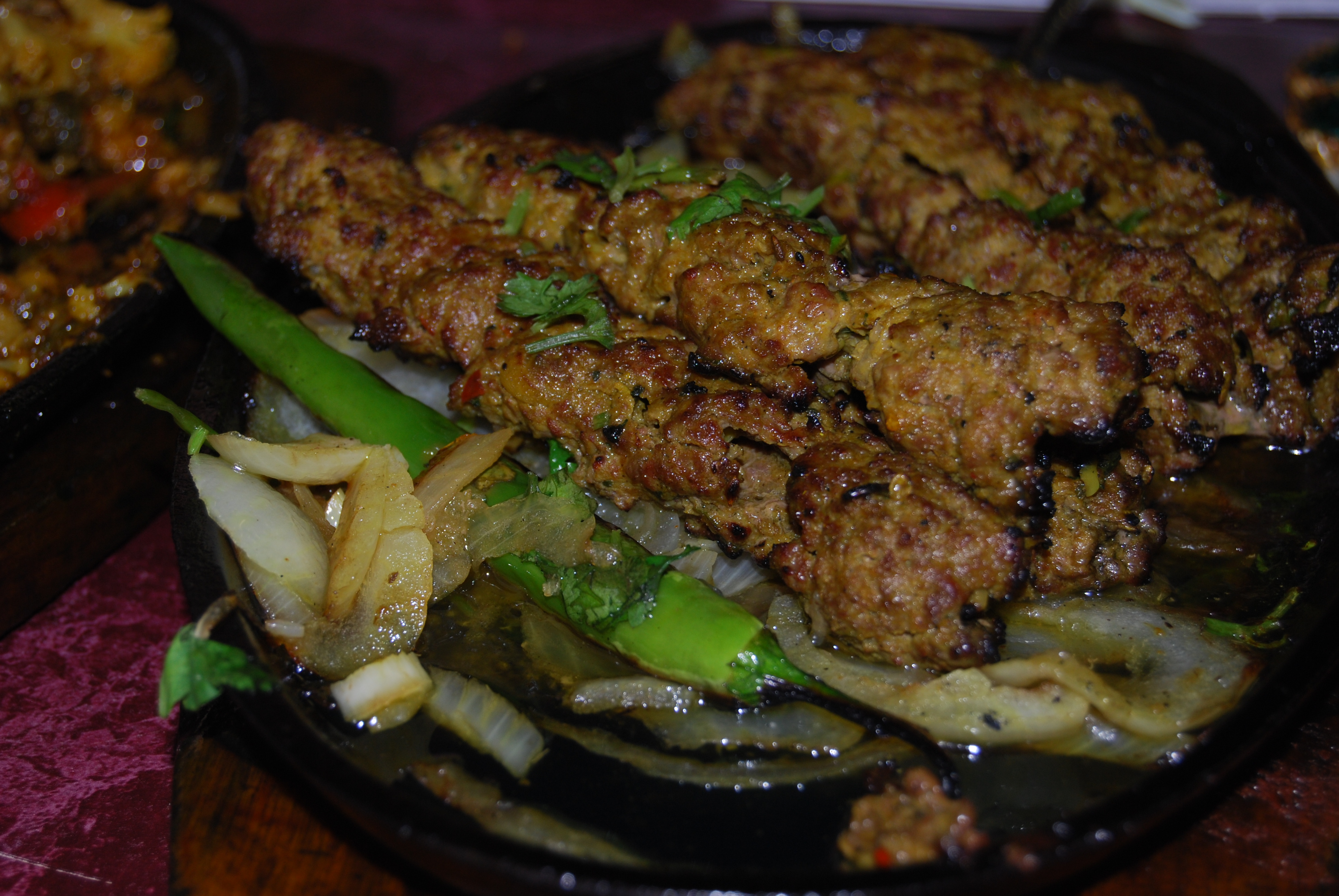
Seekh kebab (minced meat on skewers)

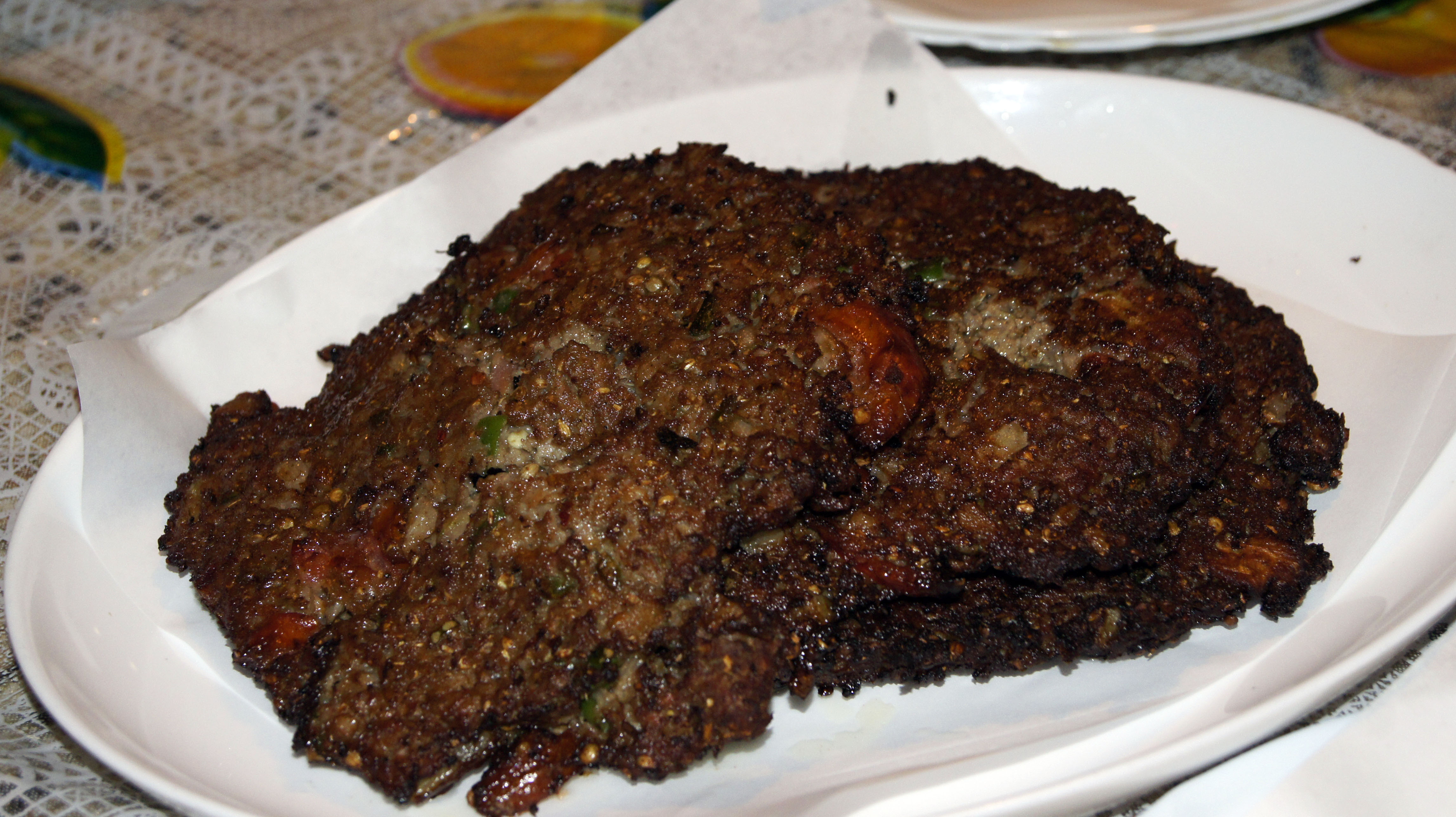
Chapli kebab

== Pulses ==
Various kinds of pulses or legumes make up an important part of Pakistani cuisine. While lentils (called daal) and chickpeas (called channa/chanay ki daal) are popular ingredients in homestyle cooking, they are traditionally considered to be inexpensive food sources. As such, they are typically not served to guests who are invited for dinner or during special occasions. Meat may be combined with lentils and pulses, whether in simple preparations or in elaborate dishes such as haleem.

Beans such as black-eyed peas (lobia) and kidney beans (rajma) are sometimes served in a tomato-based masala sauce, especially in Punjab.

Chickpeas, red kidney beans, and other legumes are also popular in Pakistani cooking. They are usually cooked in a spicy gravy and served with rice or traditional flatbread (roti). Chickpeas, known as channa, are also a common breakfast food when served with puri. Channa chaat is another favorite street food and iftaar dish; it is made of chickpeas, chopped onions, tomatoes, and chillies, and seasoned with spices (chaat masala) and tamarind paste.

A wide variety of lentils is consumed in Pakistan and frequently with rice. Daal chawaal (lentils and rice) is known as a popular comfort food in many Pakistani households.

== Rice dishes ==
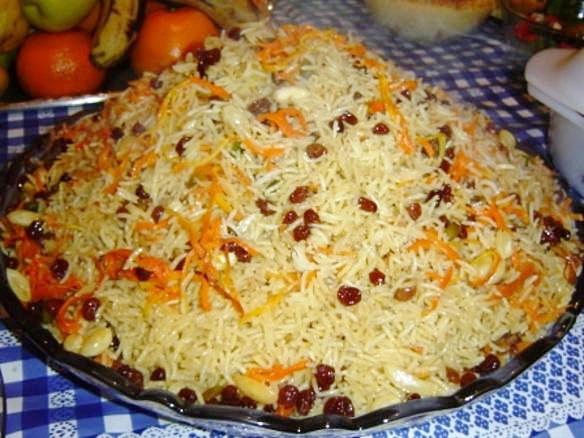
Kabuli palaw

Pakistan is a major exporter and consumer of rice. Basmati is the most popular type of rice consumed in Pakistan.

Dishes made with rice include many varieties of pulao:

- Bannu pulao – A classic dish from Khyber Pakhtunkhwa that combines beef, spices, and rice. The beef is slow-cooked with bones for a rich, flavorful taste, while the rice is prepared separately with ghee and aromatic spices.
- Chana pulao – Pulao with chickpeas; a commonly served vegetarian pulao in Punjab.
- Matar pulao – Pulao made with peas.
- Murgh pulao – Chicken and stock added. Creates a brown rice.
- Yakhni pulao – Meat and stock added. Creates a brown rice.
- Kabuli palaw – an Afghan dish, common in Pashtun-dominated regions in Pakistan such as the Tribal Areas, FATA, Khyber Pakhtunkhwa province in North-West Pakistan, and Balochistan in South-West Pakistan. It is a variety of pilaf, consisting of steamed rice mixed with raisins, carrots, and lamb.

Biryani is a commonly served dish in Pakistan, and has many varieties, such as Lahori and Sindhi biryani. Tahiri, which is a vegetarian form of biryani, is also popular. All of the main dishes (except those made with rice) are eaten alongside bread. Pickles made out of mangoes, carrots, lemon, and other fruits and vegetables are also commonly used to further spice up the food.

== Varieties of bread ==
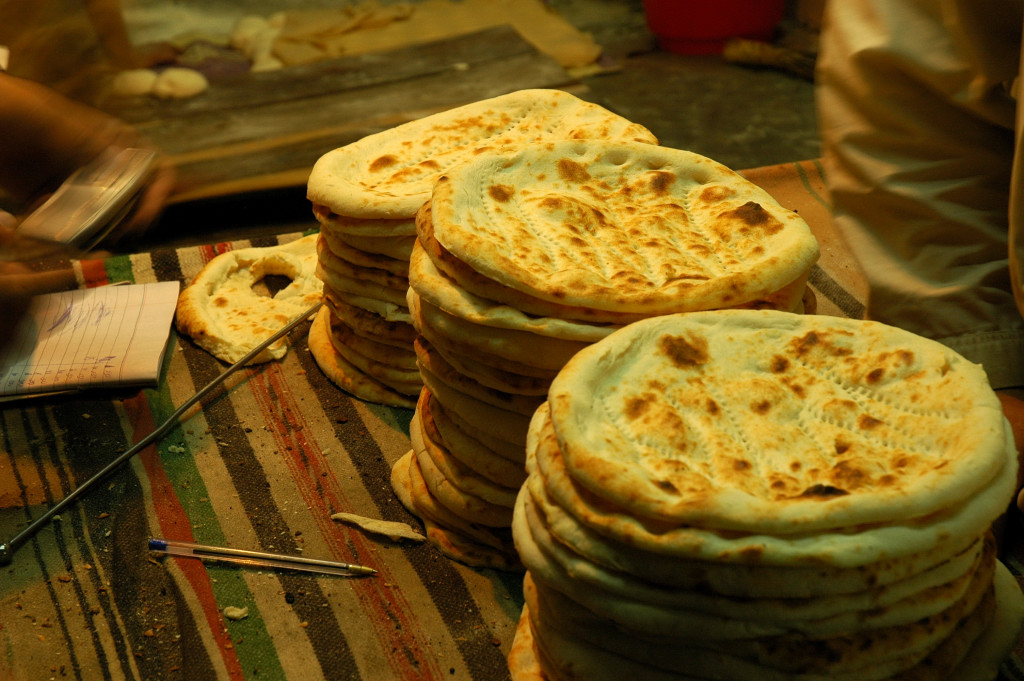
Peshwari naans freshly made in the tandoor (open oven)

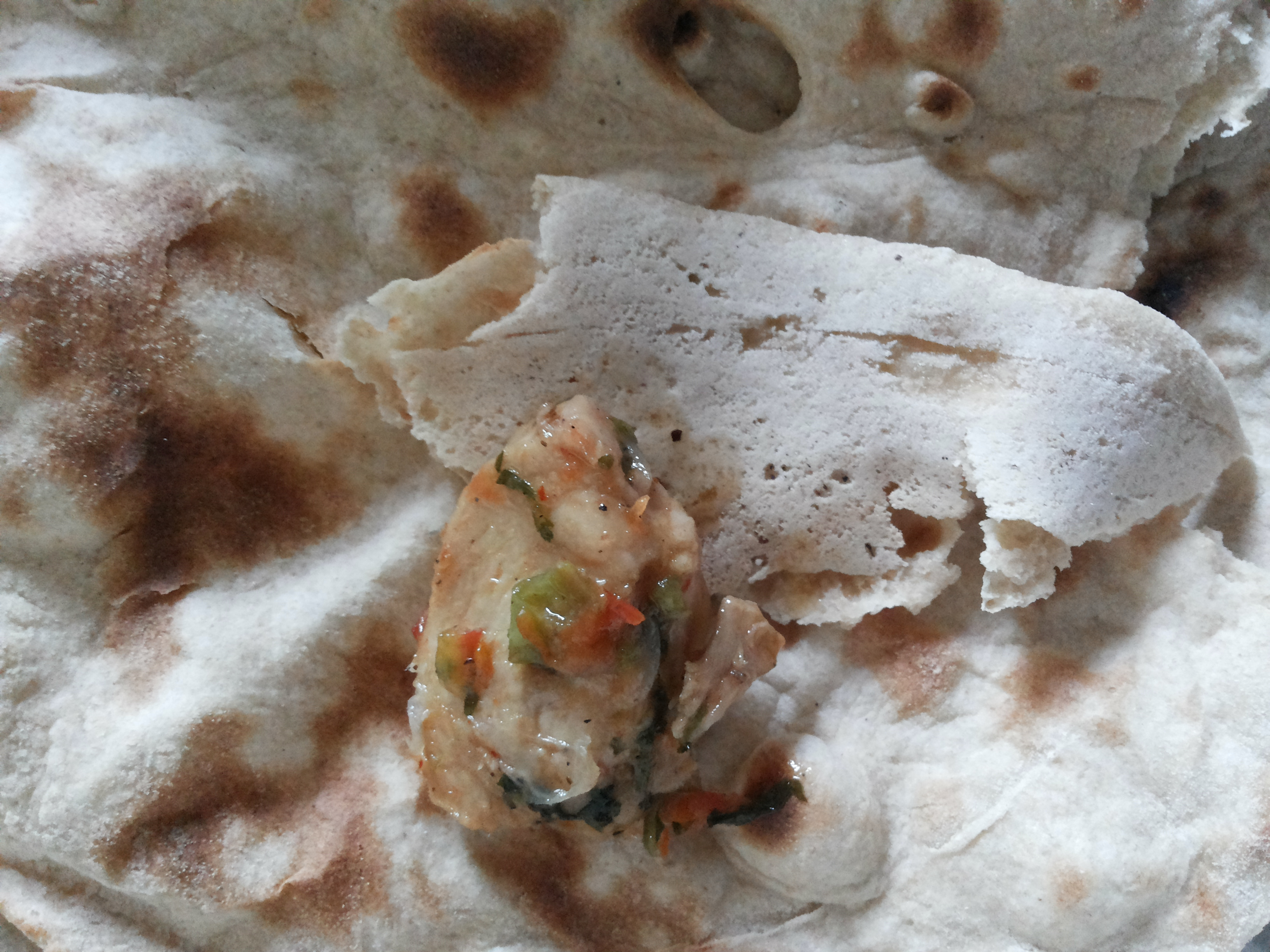
Chapati (bread) with a piece of chicken meat

Pakistanis eat breads made of wheat flour as a staple part of their diet. Pakistan has a wide variety of breads, often prepared in a tandoor. The tandoori style of cooking is common throughout rural and urban Pakistan, and also has strong roots in neighboring India, Iran and Afghanistan. Some of these are:

- Naan – In Urdu, the national language of Pakistan, the word naan means 'bread'. Unlike chapatis, naans are slightly thicker, typically leavened with yeast and mainly made with white flour. Some varieties like roghani and Peshwari naan may also be sprinkled with sesame seeds. Naans are seldom, if ever, made at home since they require tandoor-based cooking and preparatory work. Numerous varieties of plain and stuffed naans are available throughout Pakistan and each region or city can have its own specialty. Naan is a versatile bread and is eaten with almost anything. For instance, 'saada naan' or 'plain naan' is often served with siri-payay (cow's head and trotters) or nihari (slow-cooked beef stew) for breakfast in many parts of the country.
- Chapati – Common bread made in homes, where a tandoor is not available. Chapatis are cooked over a flat or slightly convex dark colored pan known as 'tava'. Chapatis are made of whole-wheat flour and are thin and unleavened. Tortillas are probably the most common analogue to chapatis, though chapatis are slightly thicker. A variant, known as 'romali roti' (lit. 'handkerchief bread'), is very thin and very large.
- Makkai ki roti, a yellowish-golden-colour chapati which is made with pure crushed corns. It is mostly served with saag, a traditional winter curry.
- Kandahari naan – Long, salty naan originating in western Pakistan and commonly eaten with Peshawari karahi or chapli kebab.
- Kulcha – This type of naan is usually eaten with chickpeas and potatoes and mostly popular in urban centers of Punjab.
- Puri – This is a breakfast bread made of white flour and fried. Typically eaten with sweet semolina halwa or gravy (made out of chickpeas and potatoes). Puri is a fairly urban concept, not part of rural cuisine anywhere in Pakistan. However, halwa puri has now become a favored weekend or holiday breakfast in urban Pakistan, where it is sometimes sold in shift carts or in specialty breakfast shops.
- Roghani naan (lit. 'buttered naan') – Naan sprinkled with white sesame seeds and cooked with a small amount of oil.

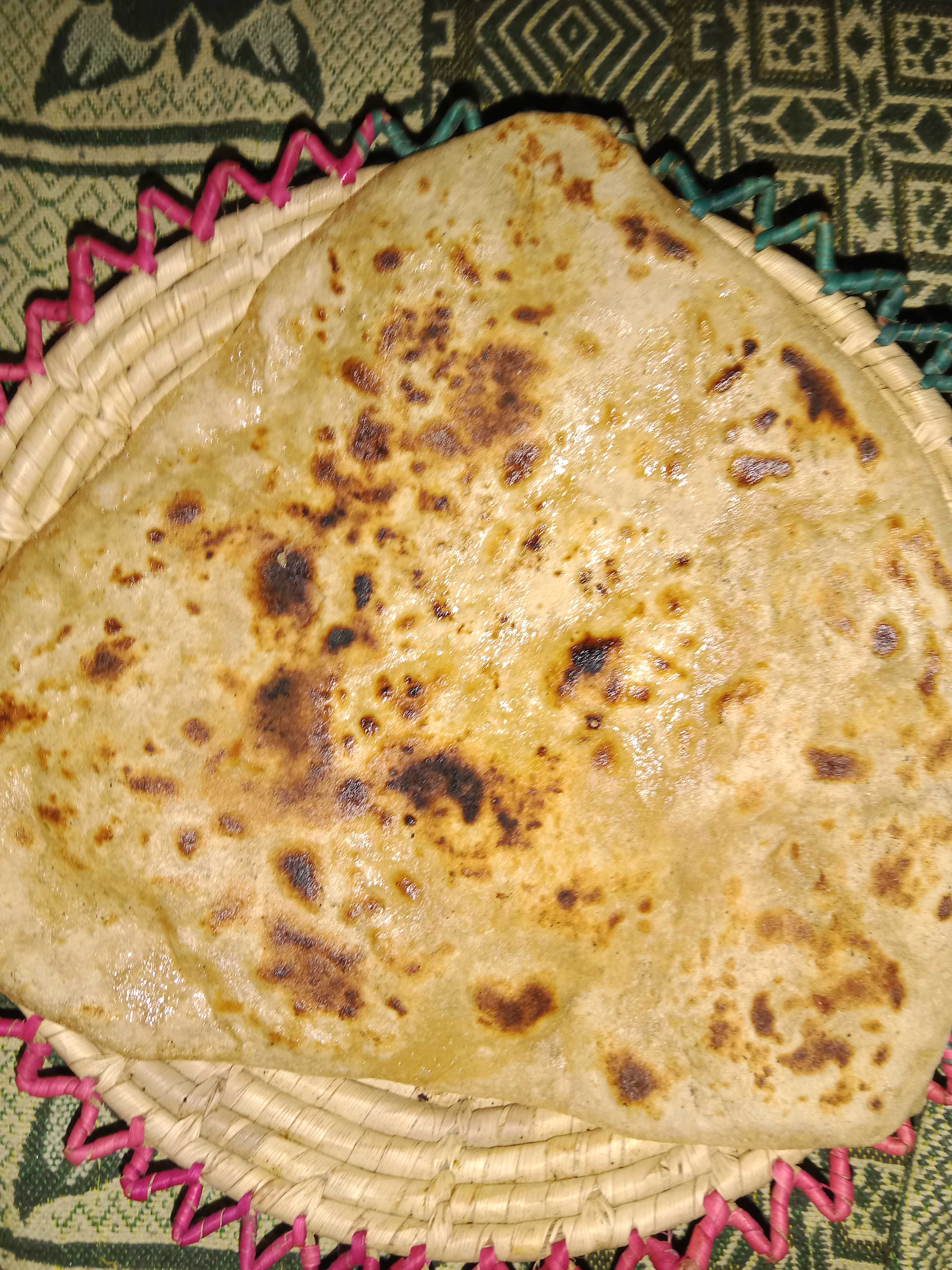
Sindhi trikundo (triangular) ofrato

- Paratha – A flat, layered bread made with ghee or cooking oil and generally cooked on a 'tava'. However, a 'tandoor'-based version is also common in rural areas. Parathas are very similar to pastry dough. Parathas most likely originated in the Punjab, where a heavy breakfast of parathas with freshly churned butter and buttermilk was commonly consumed by the farmers to prepare themselves for the hard day of work ahead. However, parathas are now a common breakfast element across the country. Along with the plain layered version, many stuffed versions, such as aloo ka paratha (potato-stuffed paratha), mooli ka paratha (radish-stuffed paratha), and qeemah ka paratha (ground meat-stuffed paratha) are common.
- Ofrata: Sindhi paratha made with oil and ghee. A four-cornered ofrato is called a chokundo, and a three-cornered ofrato is called a trikundo.
- Busri: a special Sindhi and Saraiki sweet bread made of two ofratas, crushed jaggery powder or sugar filled in, cooked with desi ghee and makhan (butter).
- Bajray ki roti or bajhar mani: pearl millet bread made in rural areas, particularly in Punjab and Sindh in winter.

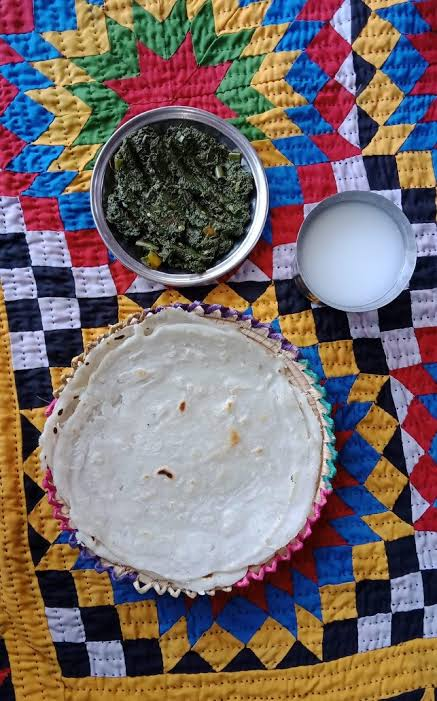
Sindhi chawran ji mani, saag and lasi

- Chawaran ji mani: rice flour bread made in Sindh; it is common in upper (north) Sindh.
- Roti – This bread is very common all over Pakistan. Tandoori rotis are baked in a tandoor, and are consumed with just about anything. In rural Pakistan, many houses have their own tandoors, while the ones without it use a communal one. In urban Pakistan, bread shops or nanbai/tandoor shops are fairly common and supply fresh, tandoor-baked breads to household customers.
- Sheermal – Saffron-flavored traditional flatbread. It is a festive bread prepared with milk ('sheer') and butter with added candied fruits. Sheermal is often a vital part of food served in marriages, along with taftan. It is often sweetened.
- Taftan – Leavened flour bread with saffron and a small amount of cardamom powder, baked in a tandoor. The taftan made in Pakistan is slightly sweeter and richer than the one made in neighboring Iran.

== Desserts ==
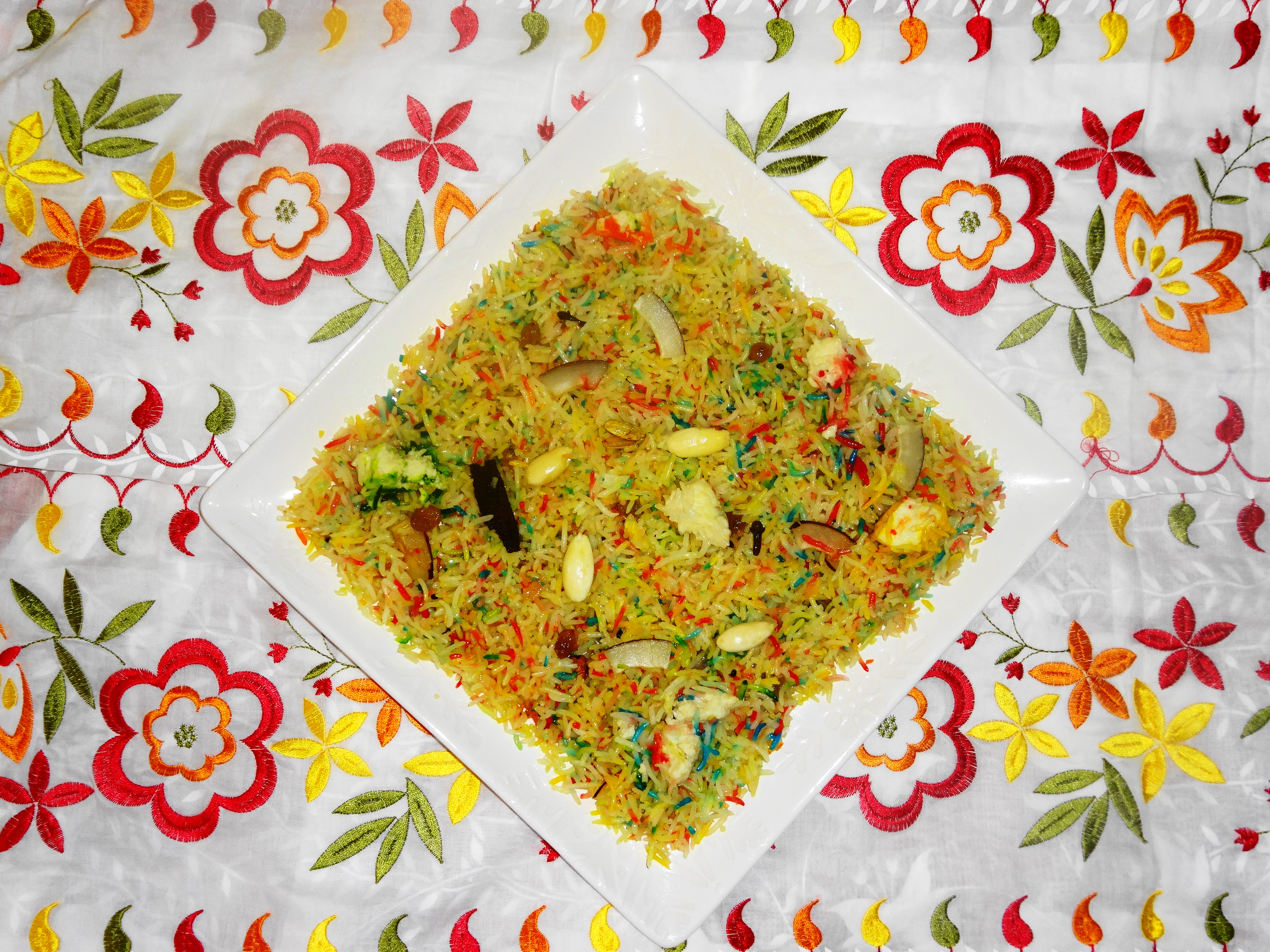
Zarda (food)

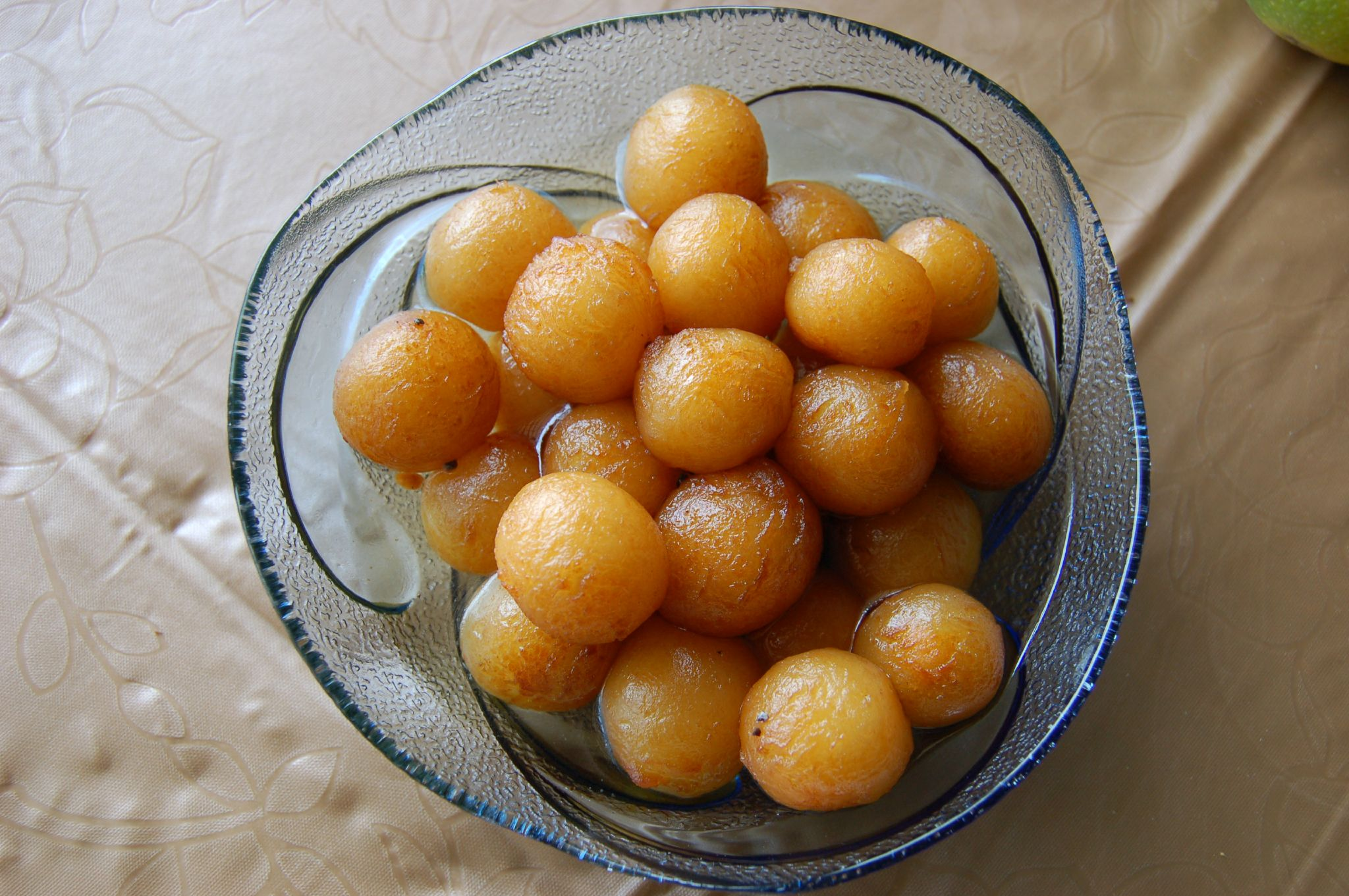
Gulab jamun

Popular desserts include Peshawari ice cream, sheer khurma, qulfi, falooda, kheer, Firni, zarda, shahi tukray and rabri. Sweetmeats are consumed on various festive occasions in Pakistan. Some of the most popular are gulab jamun, barfi, ras malai, kalakand, jalebi and panjiri. Pakistani desserts also include a long list of halva, such as Multani Halwa, hubshee, Gajar ka halwa, sohan halvah, Ugham Halwo, Sindhi Halwo, Seero, Baklava.

Kheer made of roasted seviyaan (vermicelli) instead of rice is popular during Eid ul-Fitr. Gajraila is a sweet made from grated carrots, boiled in milk, sugar, cream and green cardamom, topped with nuts and dried fruit.

== Street Food ==
Pakistani street food consists of food that is sold and served on the street and in food stalls and bazaars.

Common street food includes: kebabs and grilled foods, chaat, samosas and pakoras, bun kebabs, and halwa puri. In Karachi, bun kebabs are a longstanding street-food specialty, generally consisting of a fried lentil or meat patty served in a bun with chutney and other accompaniments, sometimes including an egg.

The street food sector is a large part of Pakistan's $450 billion shadow economy.

== Tea varieties ==
Chai is tea in Pakistan, which can either be green or black. It is consumed at all times, especially a short time after finishing a meal or with guests during any social gathering. Some add cardamom, saffron, or sugar. Both black (with milk) teas are popular and there are different varieties common in different parts of Pakistan.

- In Gilgit-Baltistan and Chitral, as well as areas near the Chinese border, salty Tibetan-style butter tea is consumed.
- Doodh pati chai is made by cooking tea leaves with milk and sugar, sometimes served with cardamom for fragrance. Extremely sweet, this is a local variation of a builder's tea.
- "Kashmiri chai" or "noon chai", a pink, milky tea with pistachios and cardamom, is consumed primarily at special occasions, weddings, and during the winter, when it is sold in many kiosks. However, unlike Kashmir the Kashmiri Chai in Pakistan is prepared with sugar and not with salt.
- "Sabz chai" or "kahwah", a green tea often served after every meal in Kashmir, Khyber Pakhtunkhwa, and the Pashtun belt of Balochistan, served with saffron and nuts.
- Sulaimani chai is black tea served with lemon.

== Beverages ==
Besides tea, there are other drinks that may be included as part of the Pakistani cuisine. All of them are non-alcoholic as the consumption of alcohol is prohibited by Islam. During the 20th century, beverages such as coffee and soft drinks have become popular in Pakistan. It is common to have soft drinks with Pakistani meals.

- Baraf Gola – Frozen Ice in a cup mould with syrup as a topping
- Kashmiri chai/Gulabi chai – A milky tea known for its pink color, with an either sweet or salty taste
- Lassi – Milk with yogurt, with an either sweet or salty taste
- Lemonade (Limu pani)
- Qehwa – Green tea with cardamom
- Sherbet (syrup mixed in water)
- Sugarcane juice (Ganney ka ras)
- Thadal – A sweet drink from Sindh

== Foreign influences ==
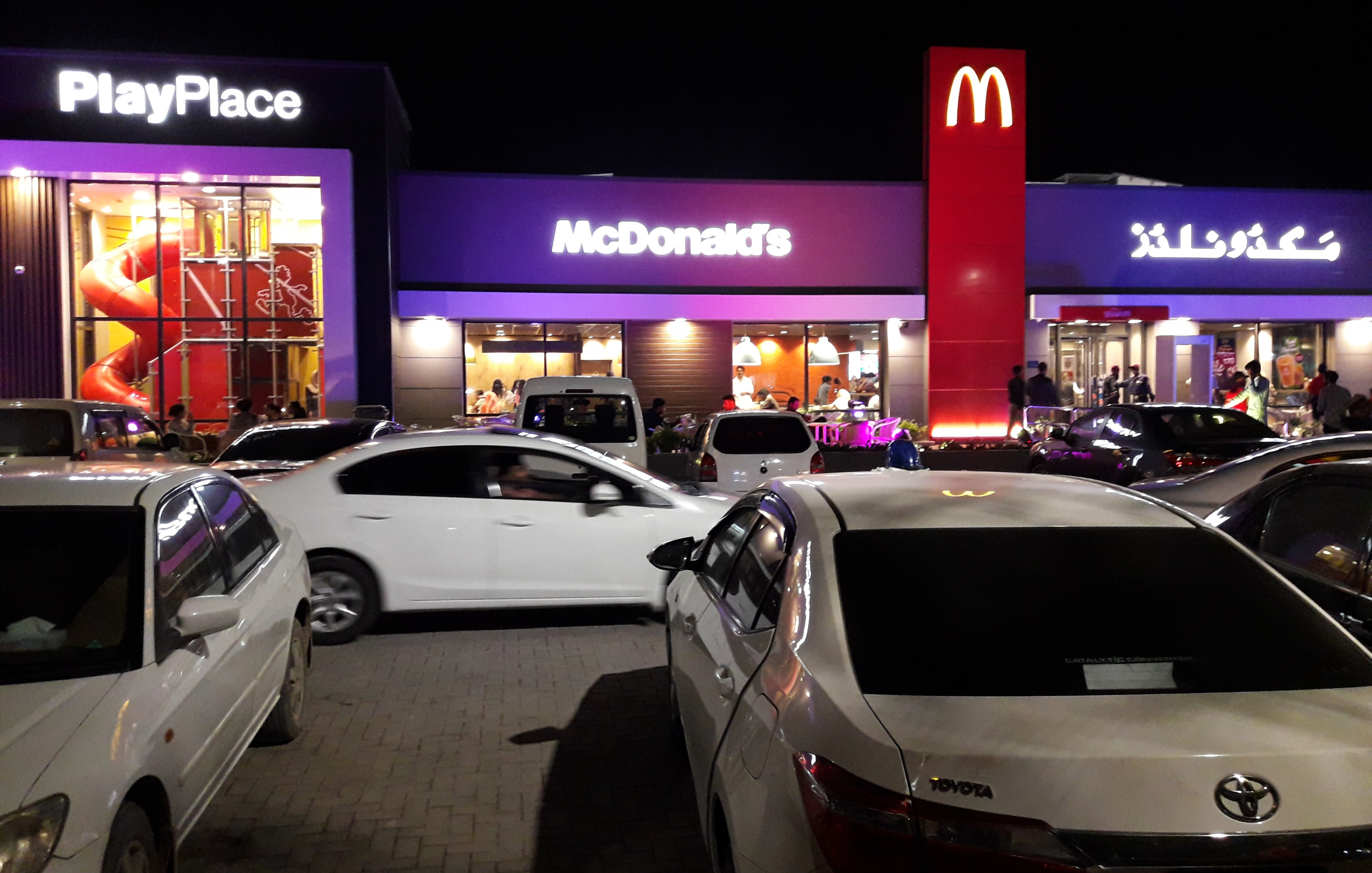
McDonald's outlet at Queens Road, Sargodha

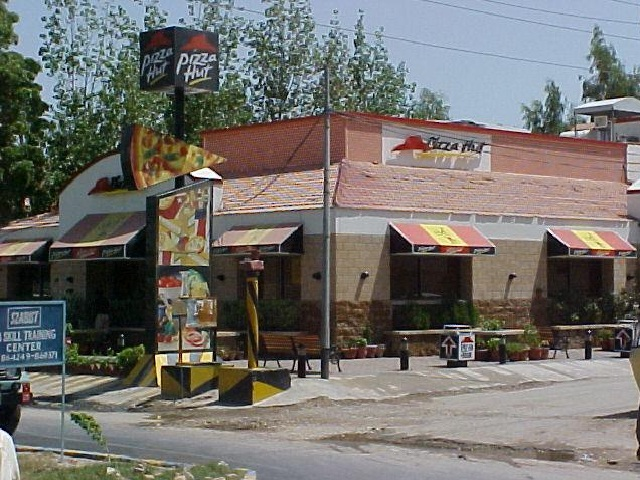
Pizza Hut outlet in Karachi

In addition to the traditional food, fast food is also very popular across the country. Occasionally, people in Pakistan dine out at restaurants with foreign-influenced food, such as Western, Arab and Chinese dishes.

Outside Pakistan, Pakistani cuisine is prevalent in countries where there are large Pakistani communities present.

Pakistani food makes use of fresh, hand-pounded masalas. Ghee is used, but the main component of the meal or a dish is meat (beef, lamb, chicken, goat, or fish), vegetables or pulses. Since the cuisine is very similar to Punjabi-style of cooking, tikka, simmered dals, tawa sabzi, and chaat feature here.

== See also ==
- Culture of Pakistan
- List of Pakistani condiments
- List of Pakistani soups and stews
- List of Pakistani spices
- Nihari Houses
- Afghan cuisine
