= Pashtun cuisine =

Cuisine of the Pashtuns

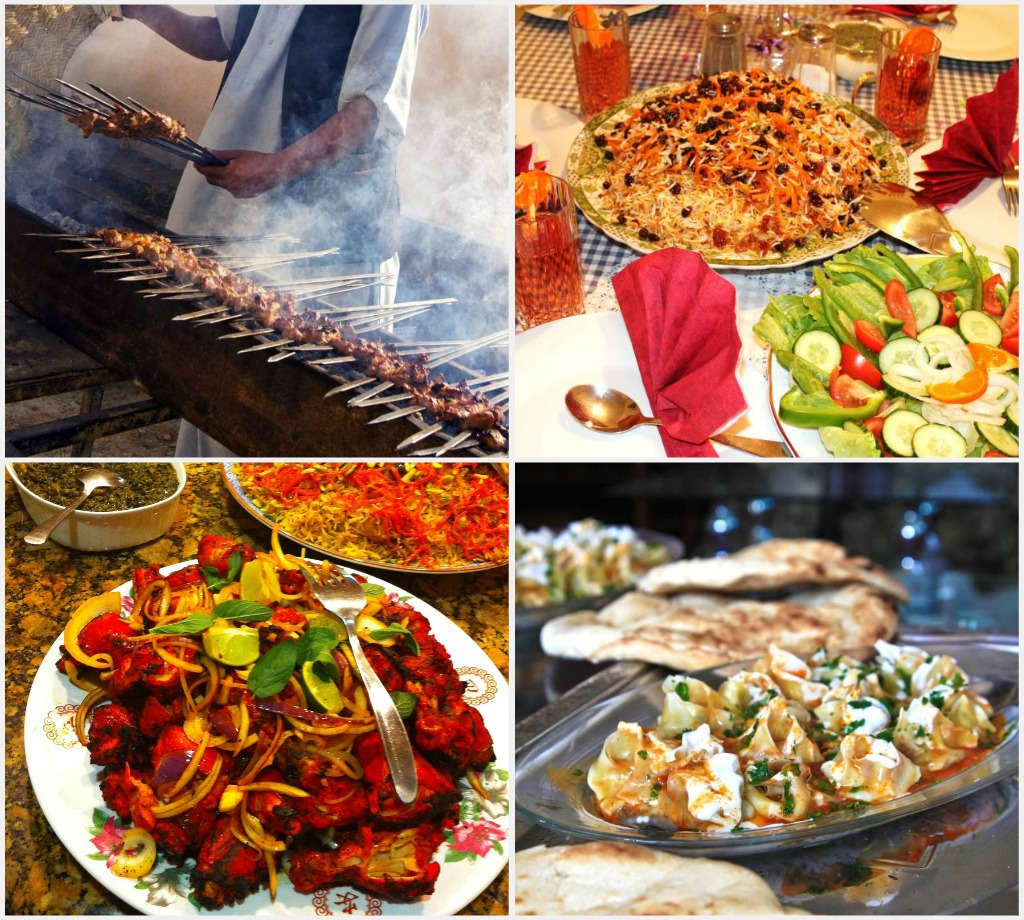
Some common Pashtun dishes, from left to right: 1. Mutton grilled kebab (seekh kabab); 2. palao and salad; 3. tandoori chicken; and 4. mantu (dumplings). Pashtun cuisine includes a blend of Central Asian, South Asian and Middle Eastern cuisines. Most Pashtun dishes are traditionally non-spicy.

Pashtun cuisine (Pashto: پښتنۍ خواړه) or Afghan cuisine refers to the cuisine of the Pashtun people and is covered under Afghan, Central Asian and South Asian cuisines. It is largely based on meat dishes including mutton, beef, chicken, and fish, as well as rice and some other vegetables. Accompanying these staples are dairy products (yogurt, whey, cheeses), various nuts, local vegetables, and fresh and dried fruits. Peshawar, Kabul, Herat, Bannu, Quetta, Mardan, Mardan, Mianwali and Attock are centers of Pashtun cuisine.

== Afghan Pashtun cuisine ==
Breakfast items include kachala boiled turnips served with chukni; chickpeas; kidney beans; and liver, often served with naan.

== Traditional Pashtun cuisine ==
Breakfast items include green tea with cardamom (kahwa), boiled eggs and malai.

At other meals, some of the following may be served:

- Bannu pulao
- Chapli kebab
- Chicken karahi
- Dum pukht
- Naan
- Peshawari kheer

== Other common food items ==
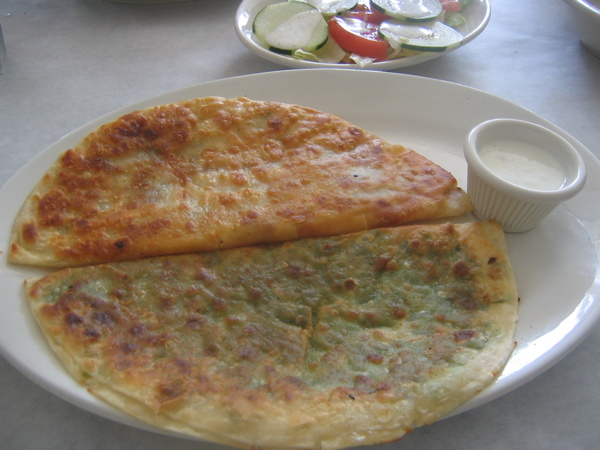
Bolani

The following is an incomplete list of food items that Pashtuns eat often.

- Afghan burger
- Aush (handmade noodles)
- Aushak (vegetable- and chive-filled dumplings topped with tomato and yogurt sauces)
- Bannu pulao, from the Bannu district of the Khyber Pakhtunkhwa. The dish is made with beef, aromatic rice, and a blend of local spices.
- Bolani, also called piraki in some parts of Afghanistan
- Badenjan (cooked eggplant in oil with potatoes and tomatoes)
- Bhindi (cooked okra in oil with potatoes and tomatoes)
- Biryani
- Chapli kabab
- Chopan kabab (lamb chops, skewered and grilled on charcoal)
- Dodai (flatbread made in vertical clay ovens called tanoor in Pashto and tandoor in Urdu and Hindi)
- Shomleh or shlombeh, also known as triwai in Kabul (a drink made by mixing yogurt with water and shaking it extensively before adding optional dried mint leaves and a small amount of salt)
- Fried fish with kachumar raita (diced onion, tomatoes, cucumbers in masteh or dahi) and naan
- Ghatay rujay or ghatay wrejay (literally "fat rice"; a rice dish resembling risotto prepared in Charsadda, Mardan, Pirpiai, and other villages of the region where short-grain brown rice is grown)
- Kabuli palaw
- Kaddo borwani (sweet pumpkins)
- Kichrei (sticky rice with mung beans and onions topped with melted qurot sauce, mostly eaten during winter)
- Londei, also known as tarshay (lamb or beef jerky cooked with rice)
- Pakora, also known as pikora
- Paratha
- Pukhtay or pekhteh (beef or mutton ribs)
- Penda or sohbat, a traditional dish consisting of pieces of posthi (a thin bread) dipped in meat soup, typically served with raita and salad. This dish shares similarities with the Arabic dish tharid and is commonly consumed in the southern Pakhtunkhwa districts of Bannu, Lakki Marwat, Karak, and Dera Ismail Khan.
- Piye wresha or pai halwa is a sweet dessert made by simmering milk, sugar, ghee, and sometimes nuts; it is often served during festivals.
- Naray ghwakha (mutton dish)
- Seekh kabab (beef, mutton or chicken)
- Shinwari tikka (roasted lamb)
- Shorwa (soup)
- Talbaar or maidan, plain rice with desi ghee and yogurt placed atop its center. It is consumed in FATA, notably in Waziristan and in regions like Paktika, Khost, and Bannu and Hangu.
- Mantu (meat dumplings, usually served under a yogurt-based white sauce)
- Masteh (freshly made yogurt)
- Rosh (cooked lamb and mutton with no spices)
Pashtun cuisine

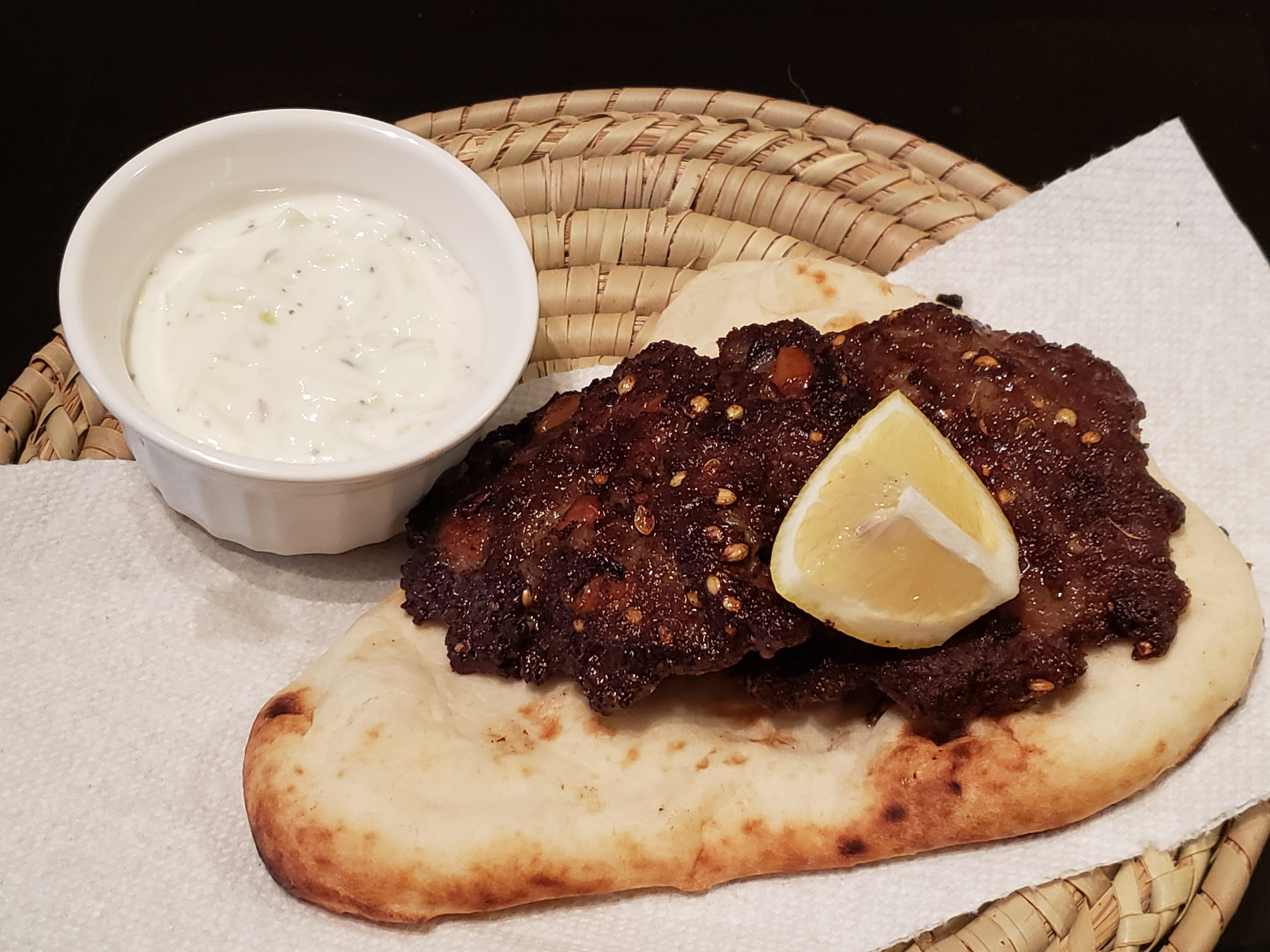
Chapli kabab

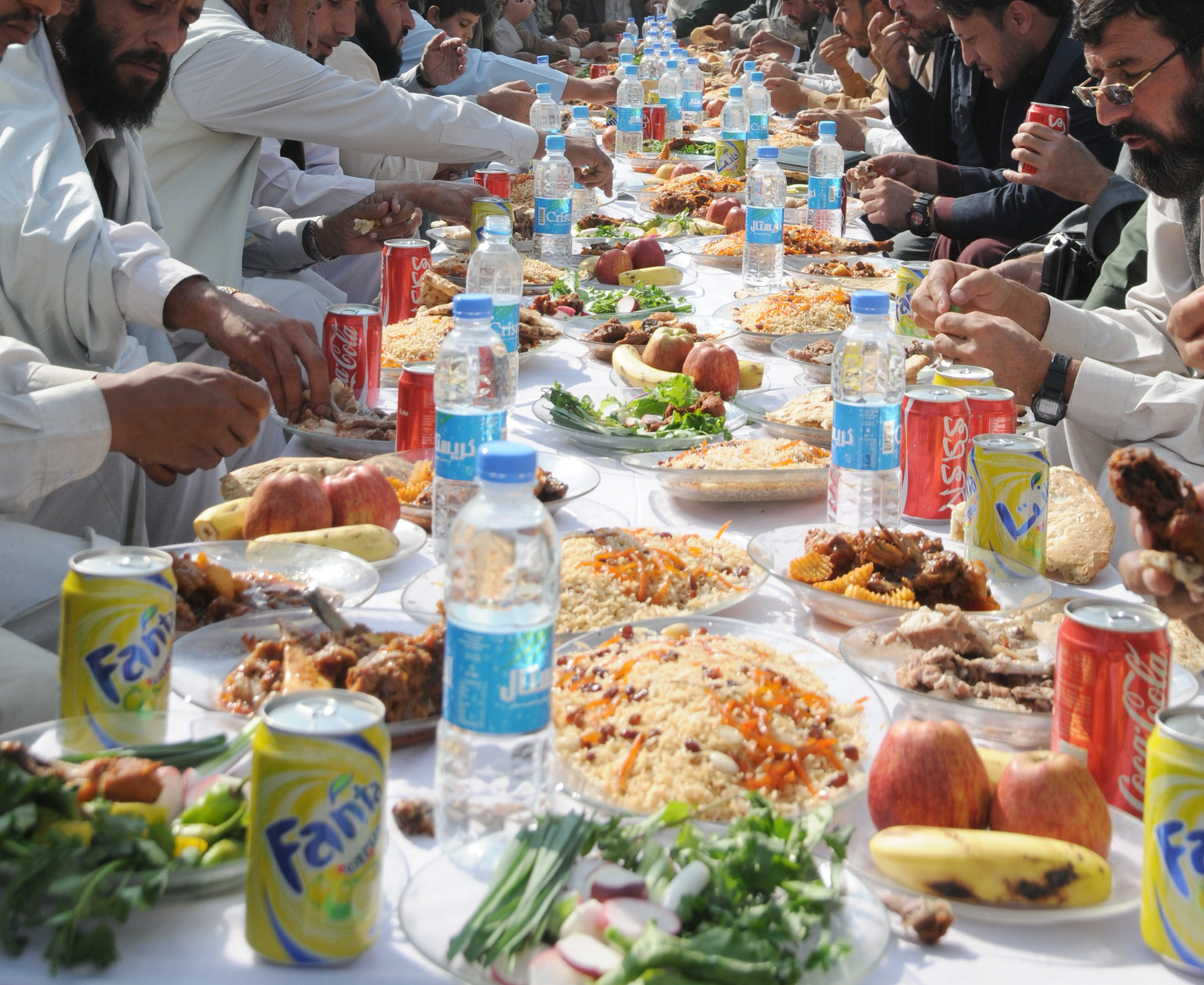
Men eating lunch in Kunar Province of Afghanistan

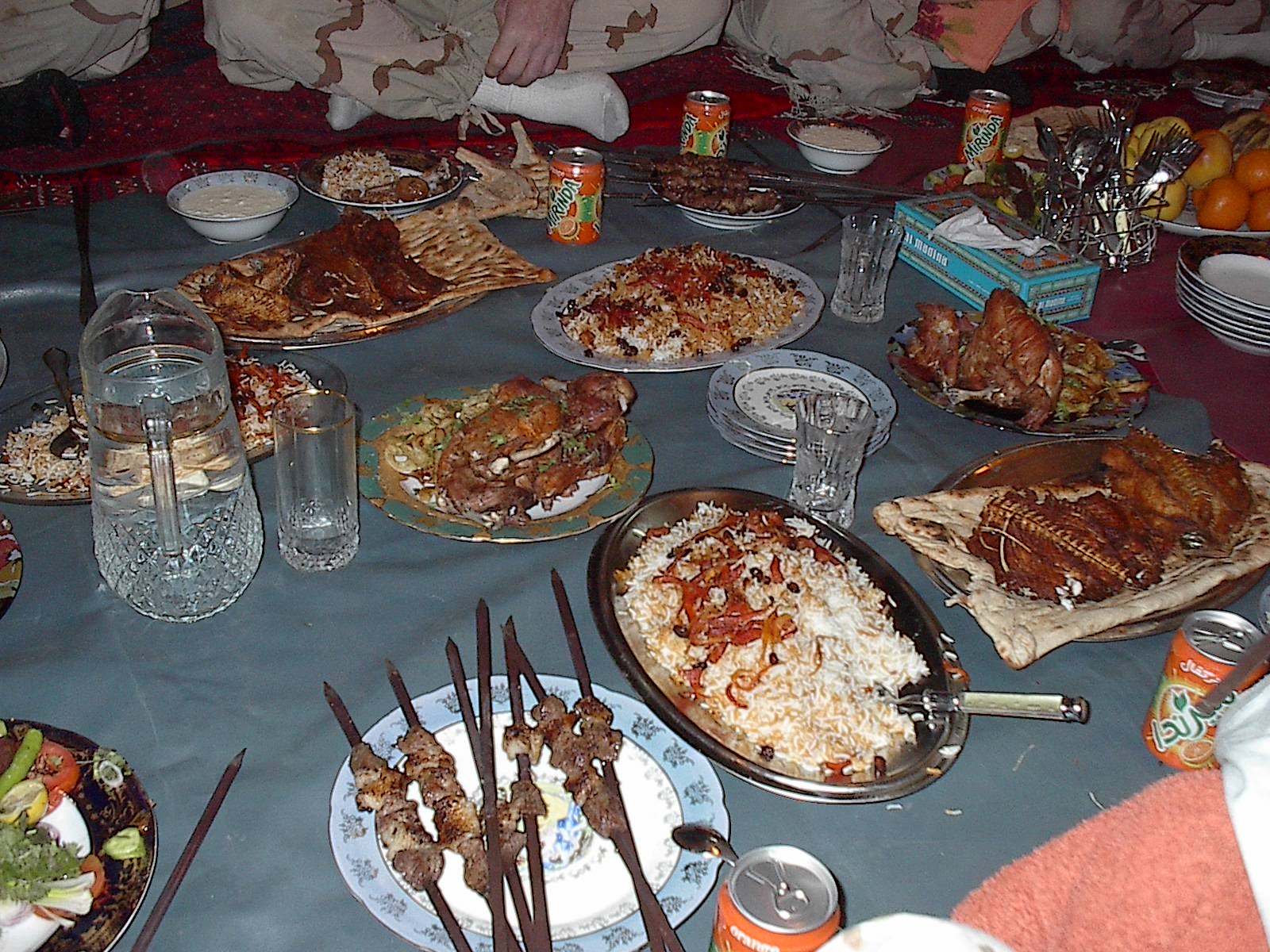
Pashtun dinner sitting on dastarkhan in Helmand Province of Afghanistan, with U.S. troops in the background

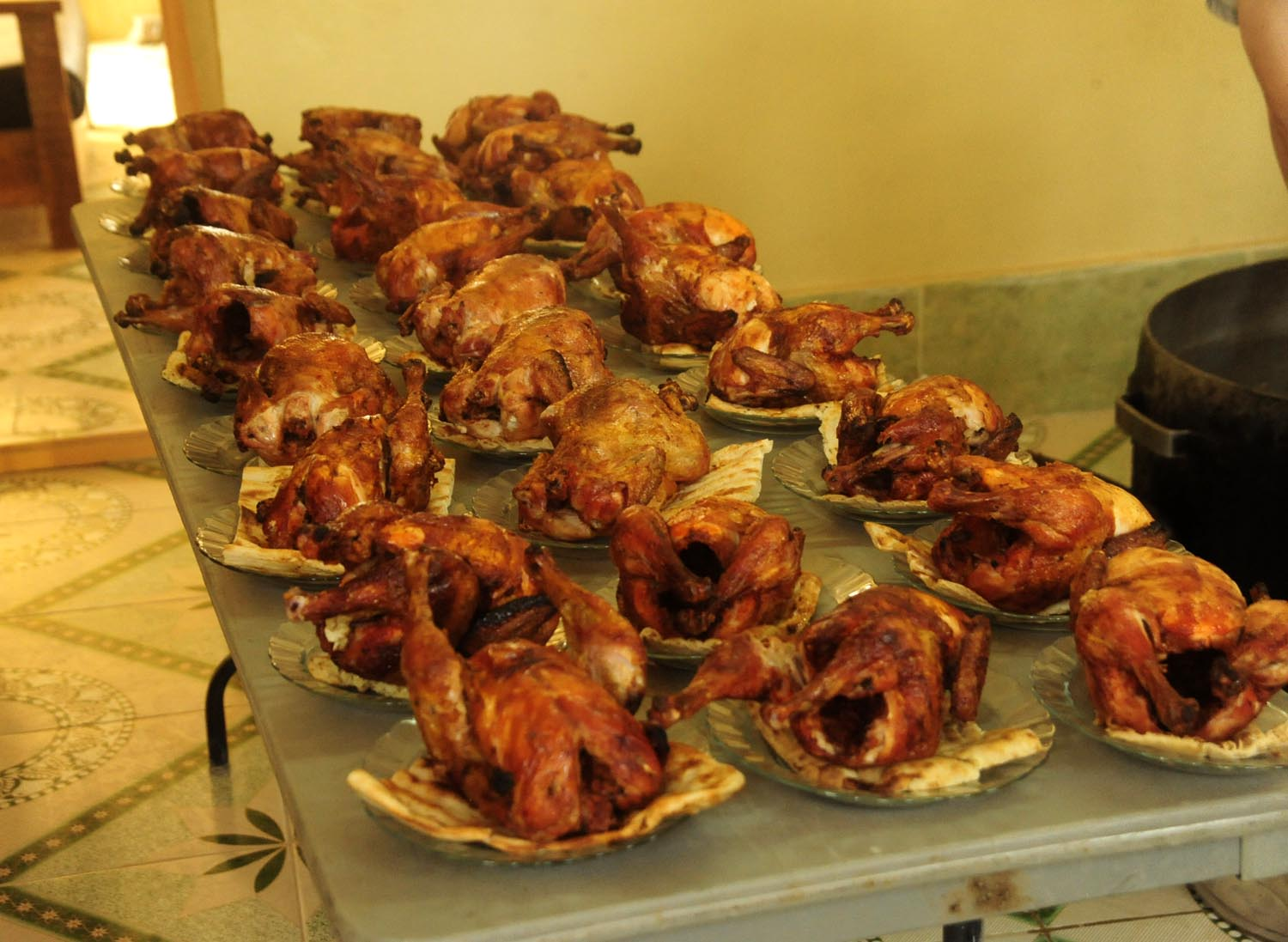
Roasted chicken is popular in Pakistan and Afghanistan.

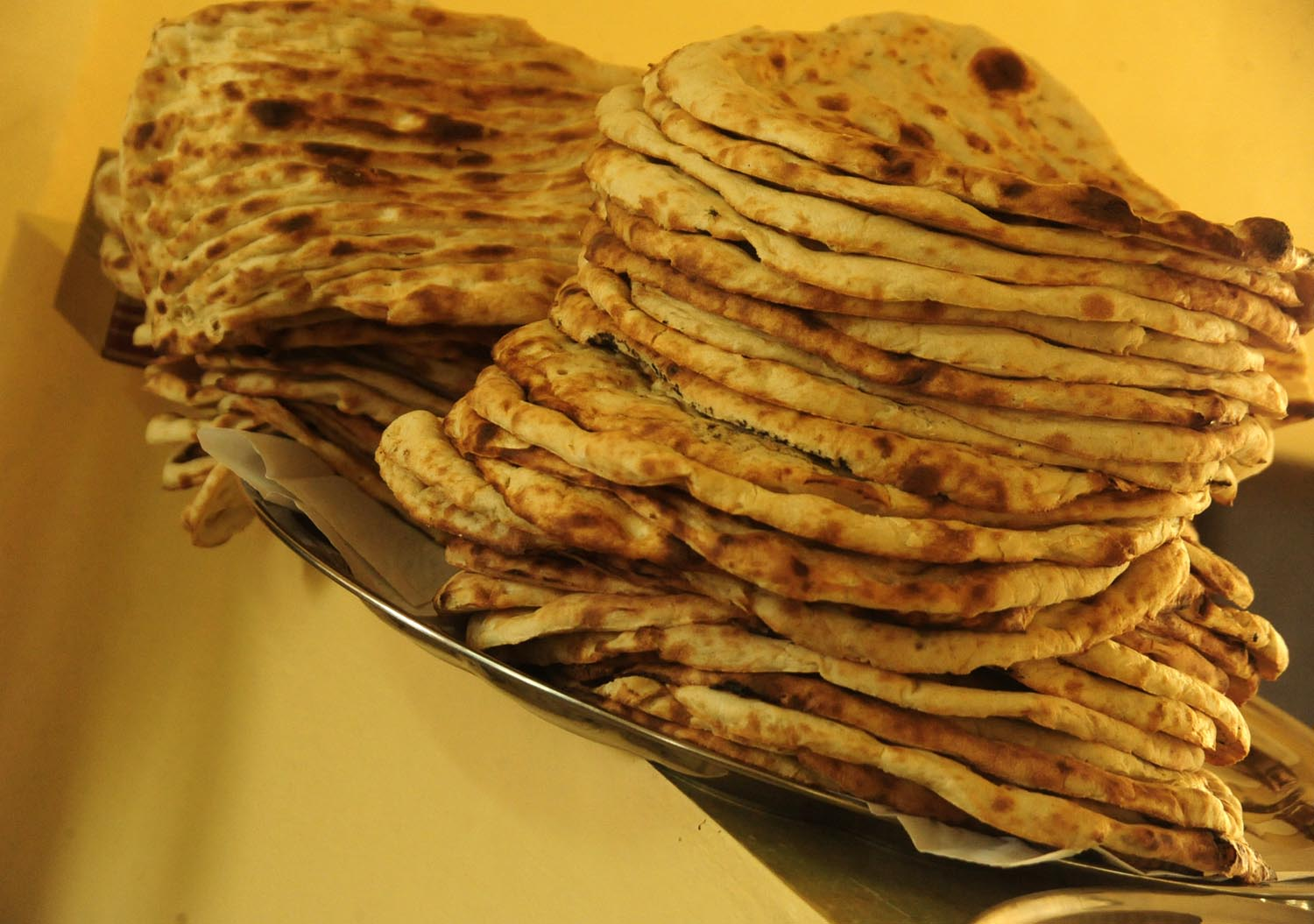
Naan bread is widely consumed in Afghanistan and Pakistan.

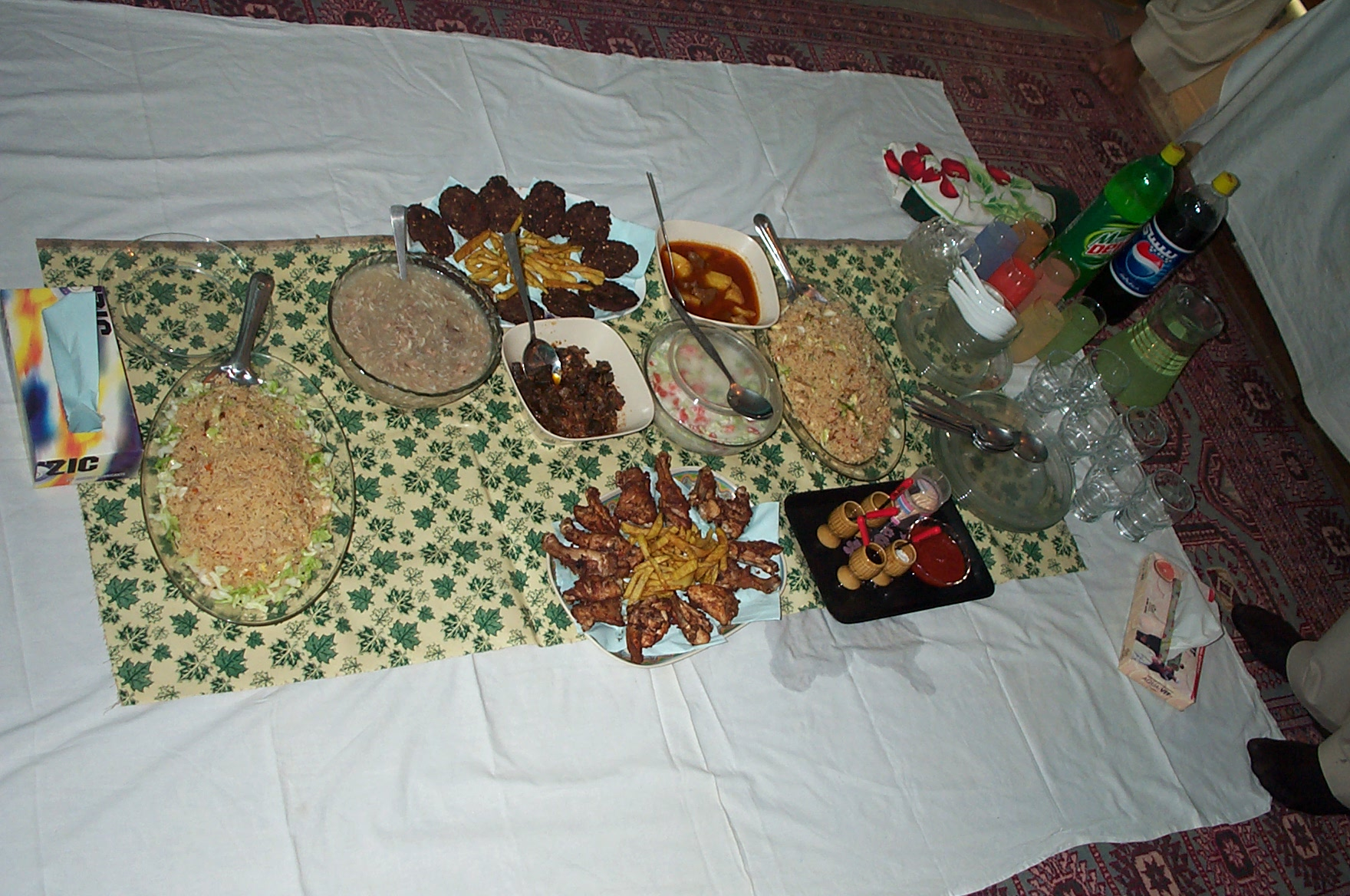
A typical Peshawari dinner course with various dishes

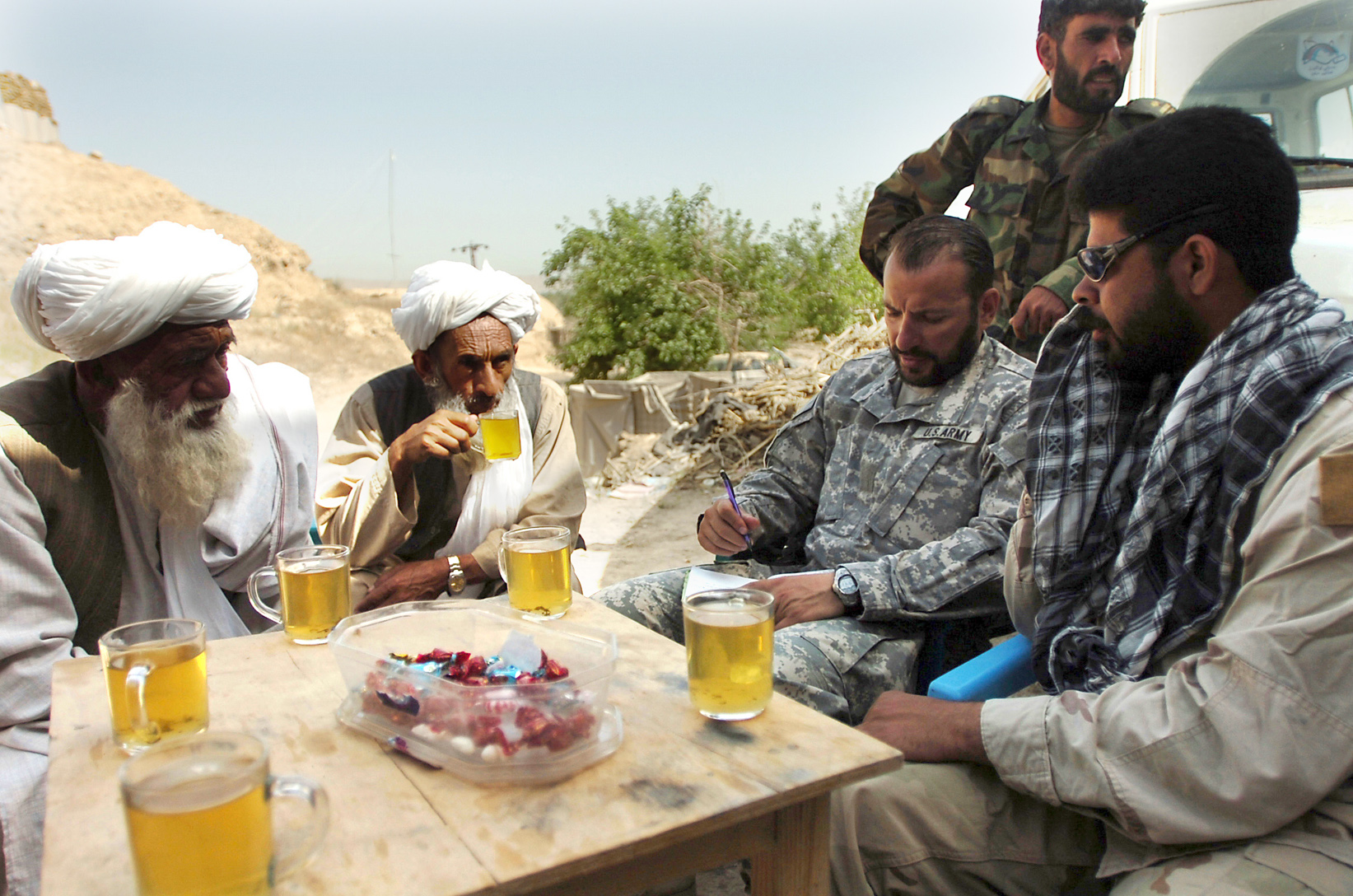
Village elders and US special forces drinking Afghan green tea (kawa) in 2007

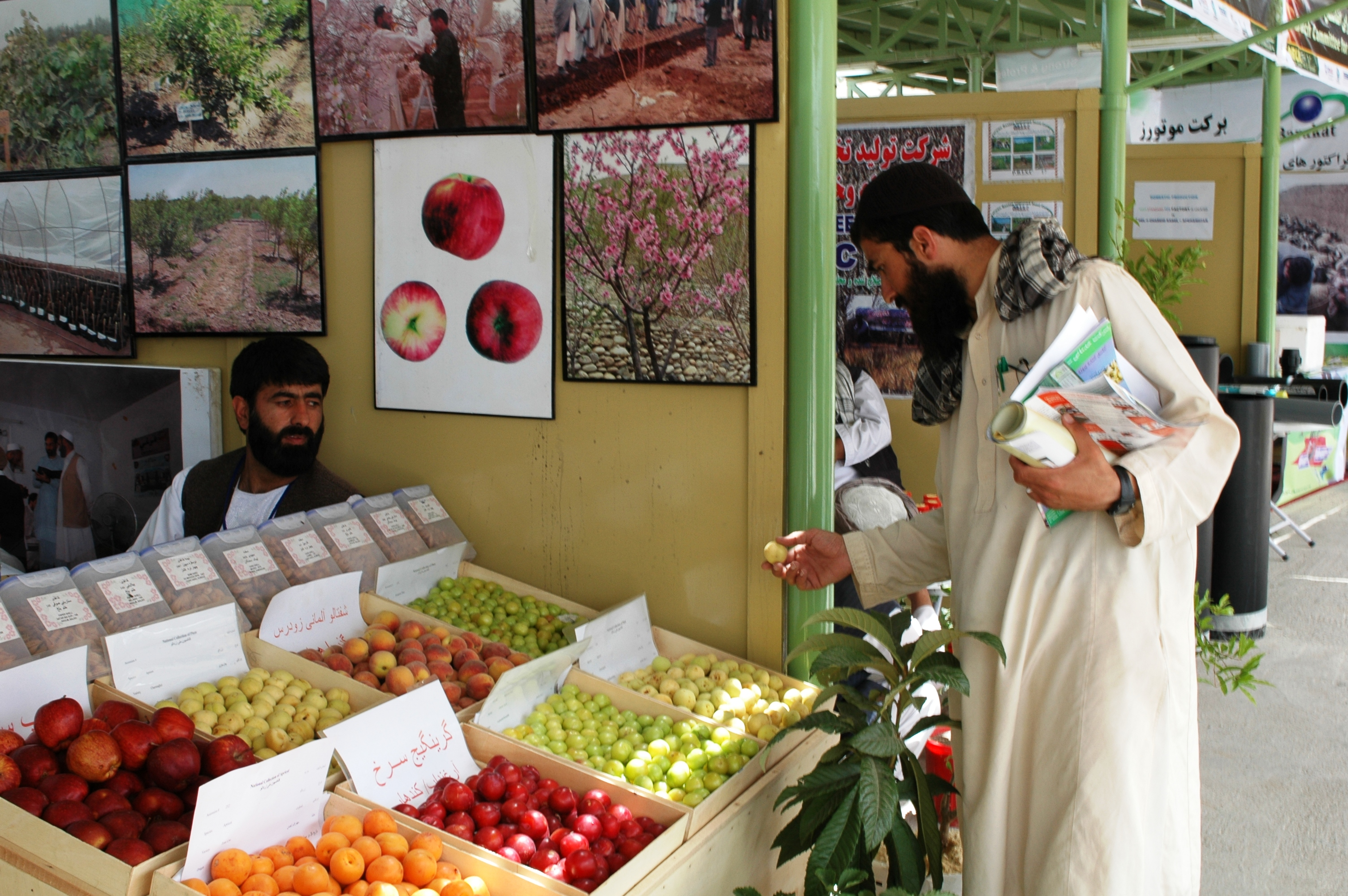
Samples of some native Afghan fruits

=== Traditional breakfast items ===
Pashtuns in their traditional territory drink green (kahwa) or black tea (chai) with breakfast. Some drink masala chai, especially the Pakistani Pashtuns. Sheer chai, a type of tea that is mixed with milk and sugar, is also consumed. Other breakfast foods can include Afghan naan, paratha, eggs, butterfat (malai), milk creams, cheeses, etc. Pastries, cakes and cookies are consumed with either tea or warm milk. Those in cities buy and eat whatever breakfast items are sold in grocery stores, which may include porridge, oatmeal, cereal, pancakes, sausages, and fruit juices, among others.

== See also ==
- Pakistani cuisine
- Pashtun culture
