= Tsochwor =

Traditional Kashmiri bread

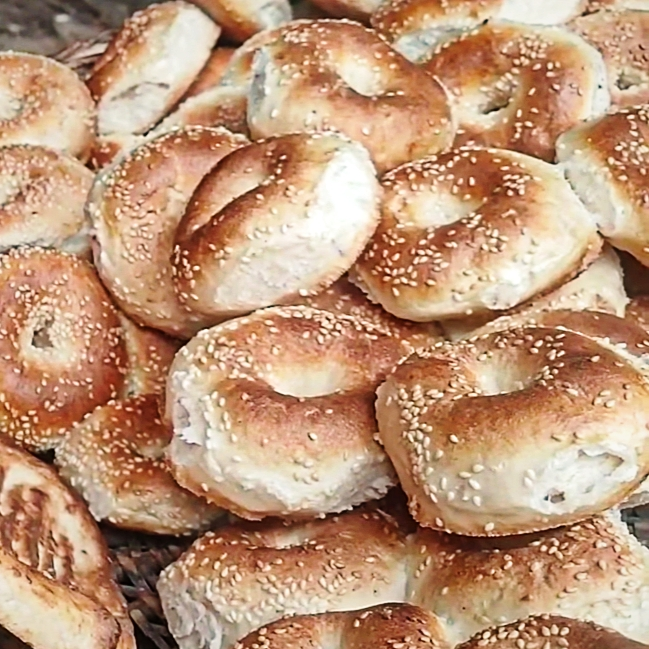
- Tsochwor
- Alternative names: Telvor
- Type: Bread
- Place of origin: Kashmir
- Region or state: Kashmir
- Main ingredients: Flour, water, sesame

Tsochwor (Kashmiri pronunciation: [t͡sɔt͡ʃiʋor]) also called Telvor (Kashmiri pronunciation: [t̪eːlʋor]) is a traditional baked bread from Kashmir. It is particularly associated with breakfast in Kashmiri cuisine and is commonly served with Noon Chai.
