= Katlam =

Traditional Kashmiri bread

- Type: Bread
- Place of origin: Kashmir
- Region or state: Kashmir
- Main ingredients: Flour

Katlam (Kashmiri pronunciation: [qat̪lam]), is a traditional Kashmiri bread, often eaten with Noon chai or as a snack. It is known for its flaky texture and rich flavor.
