= Bannu pulao =

Rice-based dish from Bannu, Khyber Pakhtunkhwa

Bannu Pulao
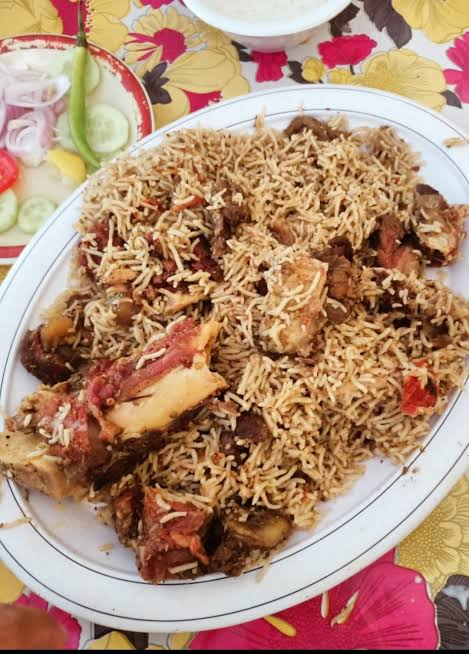
- Alternative names: Bani Pilov
- Type: Rice dish
- Course: Main dish
- Place of origin: Pakistan
- Region or state: Pakistan
- Associated cuisine: Pakistani Cuisine Pashtun cuisine
- Cooking time: 4 hours
- Serving temperature: Hot
- Main ingredients: Rice; Spices; Meat
- Ingredients generally used: Beef; Chicken; Vegetables
- Food energy (per serving): 237 kcal (990 kJ)

Bannu pulao (Urdu: بنوں پلاؤ; Pashto: بنو پلاوو) or Bannu beef pulao, also called Banuse pulao (Pashto: بنوڅۍ پلاوو), is a traditional mixed rice dish from the Bannu district of Khyber Pakhtunkhwa, Pakistan. It is made with beef, rice, spices, and stock. The beef is cooked with bones and marrow, which gives the dish a rich and flavorful taste. The rice is cooked separately with ghee, salt, and whole spices. The dish is served with a garnish of onions, green chilies, and lemon wedges.

Bannu pulao enjoys widespread popularity both within Pakistan and among countries where the Pakistani diaspora is present, particularly in the United Arab Emirates and Saudi Arabia. It is commonly regarded as a dish for special occasions, often accompanied by yogurt, salad, or raita. This rice dish exclusively uses spices and rice hailing from the region of Bannu, lending it a distinct and unique flavor.

== Ingredients ==
Ingredients used in Bannu pulao are:

- Beef: typically in large, bone-in pieces slow-cooked with water, and seasonings.
- Rice: predominantly long-grained aromatic varieties like basmati or sella rice cooked separately with seasonings.
- Garam masala: spice mix
- Onion: thinly sliced and browned in oil.
- Green chilies: typically slit and incorporated into the beef stock and also used as a garnish, alongside fried onions and lemon wedges.
- Tomatoes

== See also ==
- List of rice dishes
- Kabuli pulao
- Pashtun cuisine
