= Chapli kebab =

Pashtun-style minced kebab from South Asia

Chapli kabab
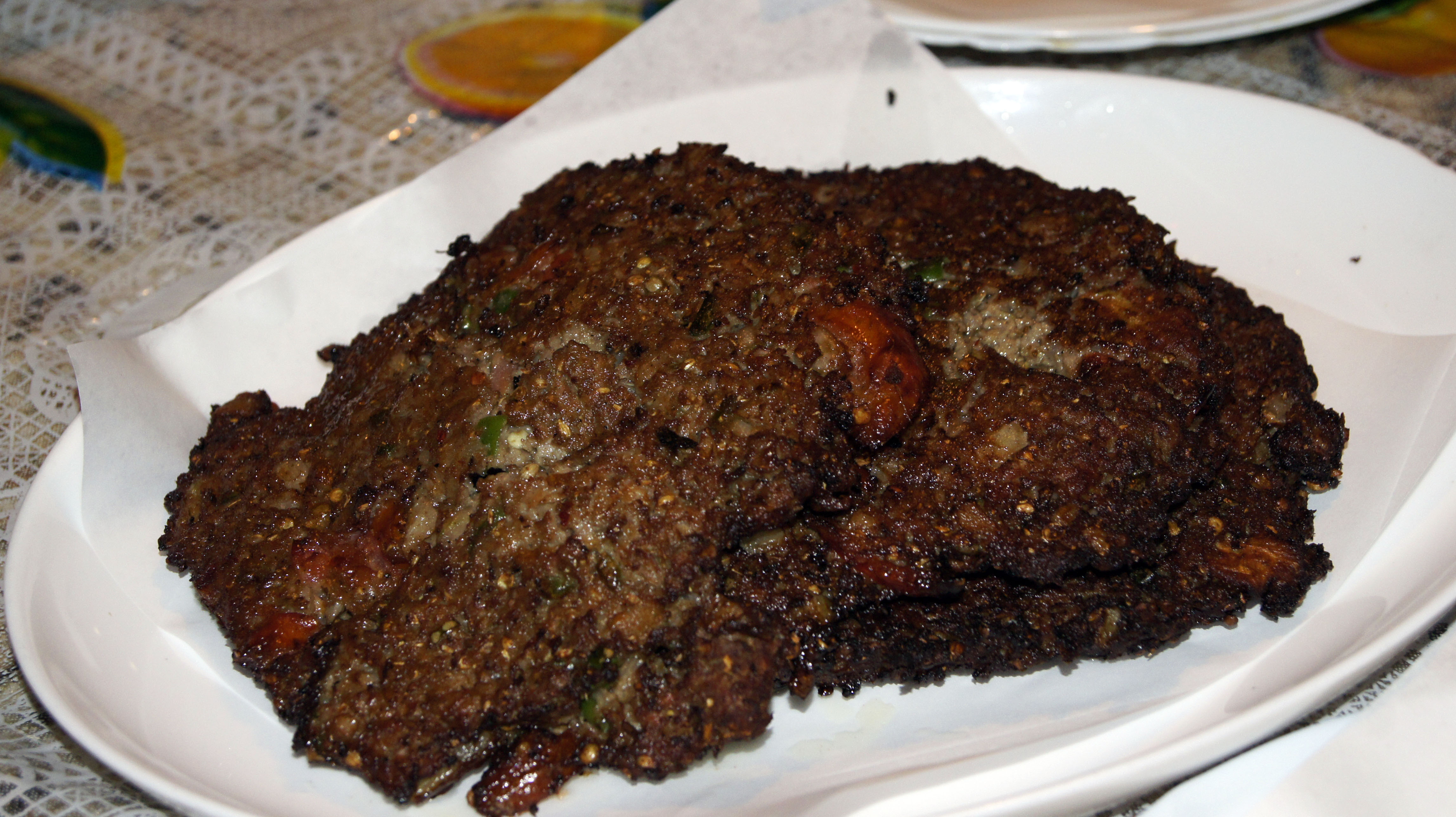
- Lamb chapli kabab served at a Balti restaurant in Birmingham, UK
- Type: Kebab
- Course: Appetiser, main course, or side dish
- Place of origin: Peshawar, Pakistan
- Associated cuisine: South Asian cuisine
- Main ingredients: Minced beef, mutton, or chicken
- Ingredients generally used: Various herbs and spices
- Similar dishes: Burgers

Chapli kabab (Note: Pashto: چپلي کباب, Urdu and Hindko: چپلی کباب, Dari: چپلی کباب) is a minced kebab made from ground beef, mutton or chicken with various spices in the shape of a patty. The chapli kabab originated from the city of Peshawar in Khyber Pakhtunkhwa province, Pakistan and is today prepared across South Asia. It is strongly associated with Pashtun cuisine.

Chapli kabab is served in kebab shops in Pakistan, Afghanistan and Muslim-dominated regions of India. Such eateries have rapidly expanded in other cities as well. Today, the chapli kebab is featured on the menu of Afghan and Pakistani restaurants across the world. Chapli kababs can be served and eaten hot with naan or as a bun kebab.

== Etymology ==
The name chapli may be derived from the Pashto word chaprikh/chapdikh/chapleet, meaning "flat" – alluding to the kebab's light, round and flattened texture. Alternatively, the name may be derived from chappal, the Urdu/Hindustani word for sandals – relating the average shape and size of a kebab to that of a chappal sole.

The tradition of eating grilled meat, skewered on sticks, has existed in the Indian subcontinent since at least the Indus Valley Civilisation. The 12th-century Sanskrit text Manasollasa documents a recipe which is similar to the one used to prepare the chapli kebab.

== Ingredients and preparation ==
The chapli kebab is prepared with raw, marinated mince and the meat can be either beef or lamb/mutton. The main ingredients include wheat flour, various herbs and spices such as chili powder, coriander leaves, followed by smaller quantities of onions, tomatoes, eggs, ginger, coriander or cumin seeds, green chillies, corn starch, salt and pepper, baking powder and citric juice, like that of lime or lemon.

The kebabs can be fried shallow or deep in vegetable cooking oil over medium heat. The traditional chapli kebab is prepared by frying the kebabs in lamb fat or cow fat over wood-fired stoves to lend an organic flavour. This approach is avoided by some gastronomists, citing health-conscious reasons.

== Serving ==
Once cooked, chapli kebabs can be served and garnished with parsley, chopped onions and tomatoes, along with other accompaniments such as various chutney sauces, salad, yoghurt, pickles or nuts. The chapli kebab is best served aromatic, moist and spicy. It is considered a specialty of Pashtun cuisine and often served to guests. The kebab is commonly consumed in meals with bread such as naan, rice dishes such as Kabuli pulao, or wrapped in fast food. In winters, green tea such as kahwah may traditionally be served alongside it, while cold drinks are preferred in the summers.

== See also ==
- List of kebabs
