= Badenjan =

Badenjan بادنجان
- Village
- Location within Iran
- Coordinates: 28°47′46″N 53°02′27″E
- Country: Iran
- Province: Fars
- County: Jahrom
- Bakhsh: Simakan
- Rural District: Posht Par

Population (2006)
  - Total: 293
- Time zone: UTC+3:30 (IRST)
  - Summer (DST): UTC+4:30 (IRDT)

Badenjan (Persian: بادنجان, also Romanized as Bādenjān; also known as Badinjān and Deh-e Bādenjān) is a village in Posht Par Rural District, Simakan District, Jahrom County, Fars province, Iran. At the 2006 census, its population was 293, in 72 families.
