= Kahwah =

Type of South Asian green tea

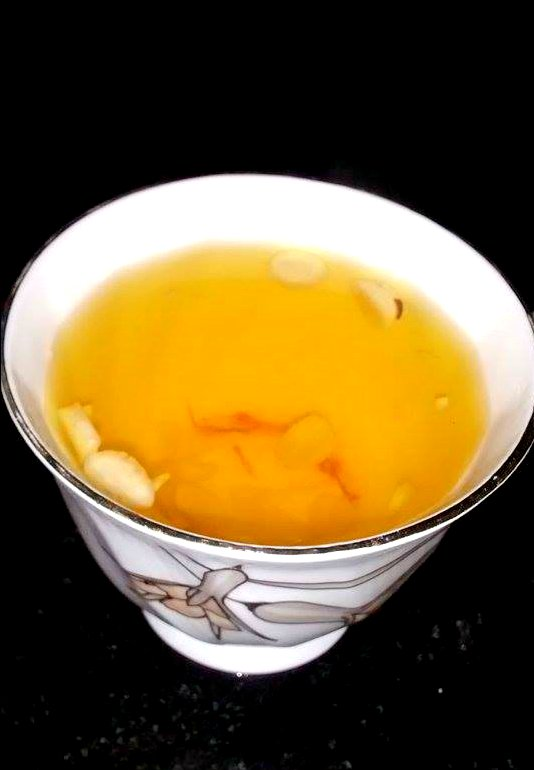
- Type: Tea
- Place of origin: Kashmir
- Main ingredients: green tea leaves, saffron, cardamom

Kahwah (also transliterated as qehwa, kehwa or kahwa, Kashmiri pronunciation: [qahʋɨ]) is a traditional Kashmiri green tea (Camellia sinensis) preparation, widely believed to have originated in the Kashmir Valley. It is widely consumed in India, Pakistan, Afghanistan, and some regions of Central Asia.

== Preparation ==
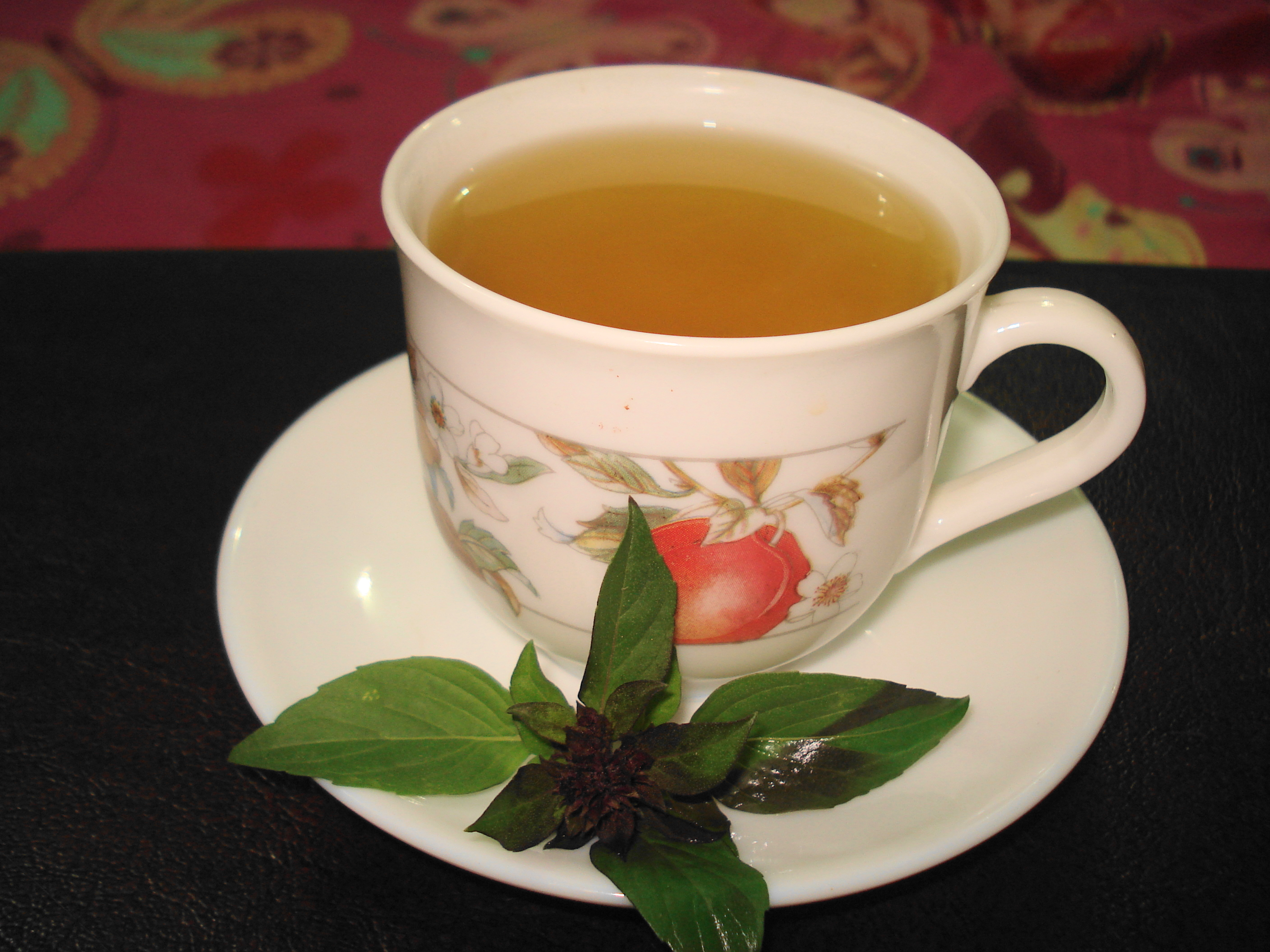
A cup of Kahwah made with tulsi in place of the typical green tea

Kashmiri Kahwah is made by boiling green tea leaves with local saffron, cinnamon, cardamom, ginger, cloves and occasionally Kashmiri roses. It is generally served with sugar or honey and crushed nuts, usually almonds or walnuts. Some varieties are made as a herbal infusion only—without the green tea leaves.

Traditionally, kahwah is prepared in a copper kettle known as a samovar. A samovar, which originates from Russia, consists of a fire container running as a central cavity, in which live coals are placed to keep the tea warm. Around the fire container there is a space for water to boil and the tea leaves and other ingredients are mixed with the water. Kahwah may also be made in normal pots and kettles, as modern day urban living may not always permit the use of elaborate samovars. Sometimes milk is added to the Kahwah, but this is generally given to the elderly or the sick. Kahwah is commonly served without milk.

Peshawari Qehwa (a variety of Kahwah found in Khyber Pakhtunkhwa) is traditionally made with Jasmine tea and green cardamom. It is famously served at chaikhanas (or tea houses) of Qissa Khwani Bazaar.

== History ==
While its exact origins are unclear, kahwa tea leaves are said to have come to Kashmir through the Spice Route, which Kashmir was a central point of. Many believe that it originated during the Kushan empire in the first and second century AD. The word Kahwe in Kashmiri means "sweetened tea", though the word also seems to be related to the Turkish word for coffee (kahve) which in turn might be derived from the Arabic word "qahwah."

Historically, kahwah has been popular as a drink throughout Kashmir, Afghanistan, Central Asia, Iran and the Middle East. Even today, it remains a popular drink of choice in these regions.

== Modern usage and popularity ==
Today, this historically popular drink is usually served to guests or as part of a celebration dinner, and saffron (kong) is added to the kahwah for special visitors in Kashmir. It is often served in tiny, shallow cups. Kehwa in Kashmir is also commonly served after Wazwan and elaborate family dinners. The green tea leaves are brought in from the neighbouring Kangra region which has been known to historically export green tea to Kashmir, Afghanistan and other parts of Central Asia.

It is traditionally served to the guests as a gesture of hospitality and his quite popular in the colder months in Kashmir.

== See also ==
- Noon chai
