= Noon chai =

Tea from Kashmir, India

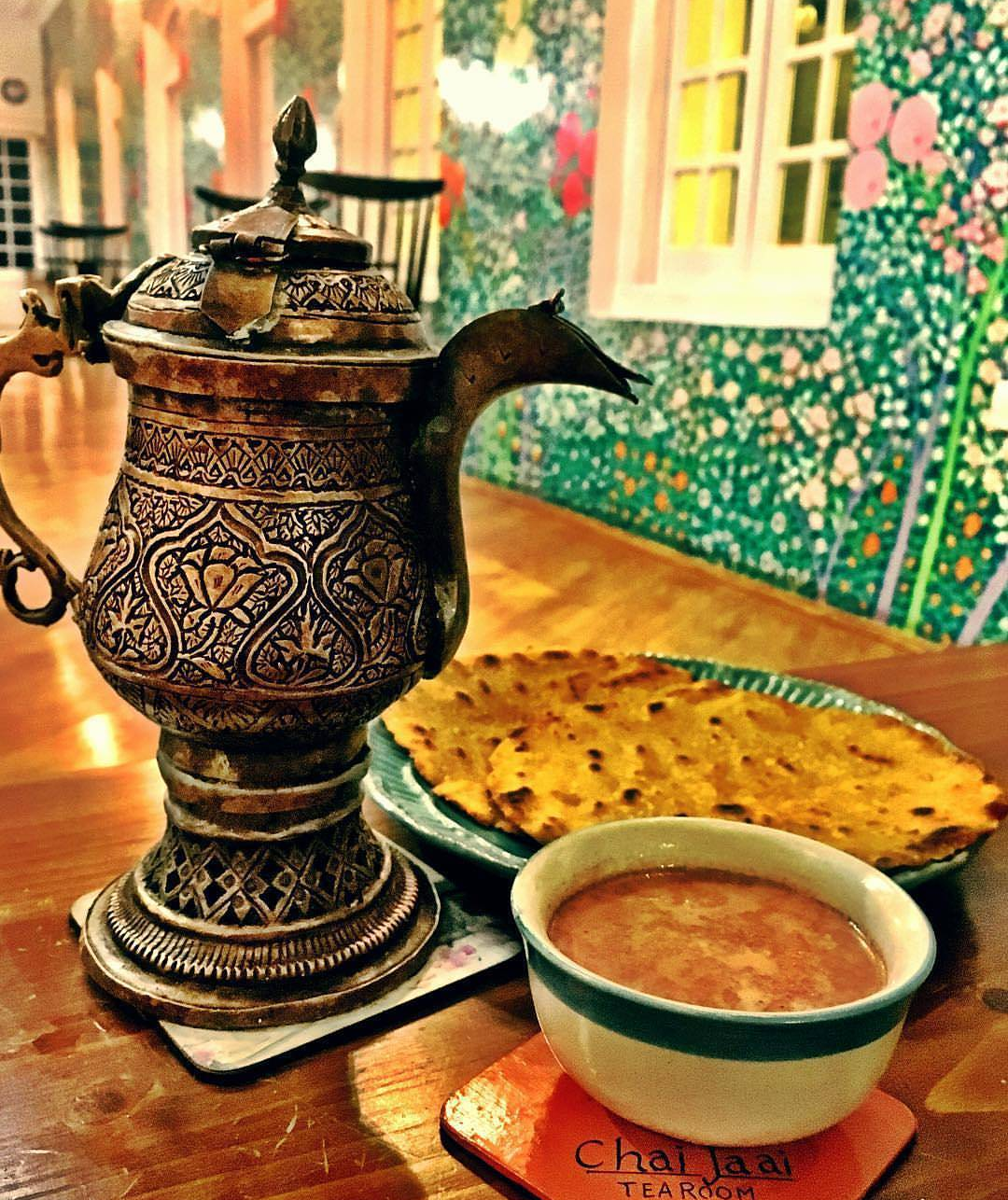
- Alternative names: Kashmiri tea, Pink tea, gulabi chai, Namkeen chai, Sheer chai
- Place of origin: India
- Region or state: Kashmir
- Associated cuisine: Indian
- Main ingredients: gunpowder tea, milk, soda, salt

Noon chai (Kashmiri pronunciation: [nuːnɨ t͡ʃaːj]) or Sheer chai ([ʃiːrʲ t͡ʃaːj]), (also called Kashmiri tea, pink tea and gulabi chai) is a traditional tea beverage originating in the Kashmir Valley of Jammu and Kashmir, India. It is made with gunpowder tea (green tea leaves rolled into small balls), milk and baking soda. It has also become popular outside India, mainly in the Caribbean.

== Etymology ==
The word noon means 'salt' in several Indian languages, such as Kashmiri, Hindi and Bengali.

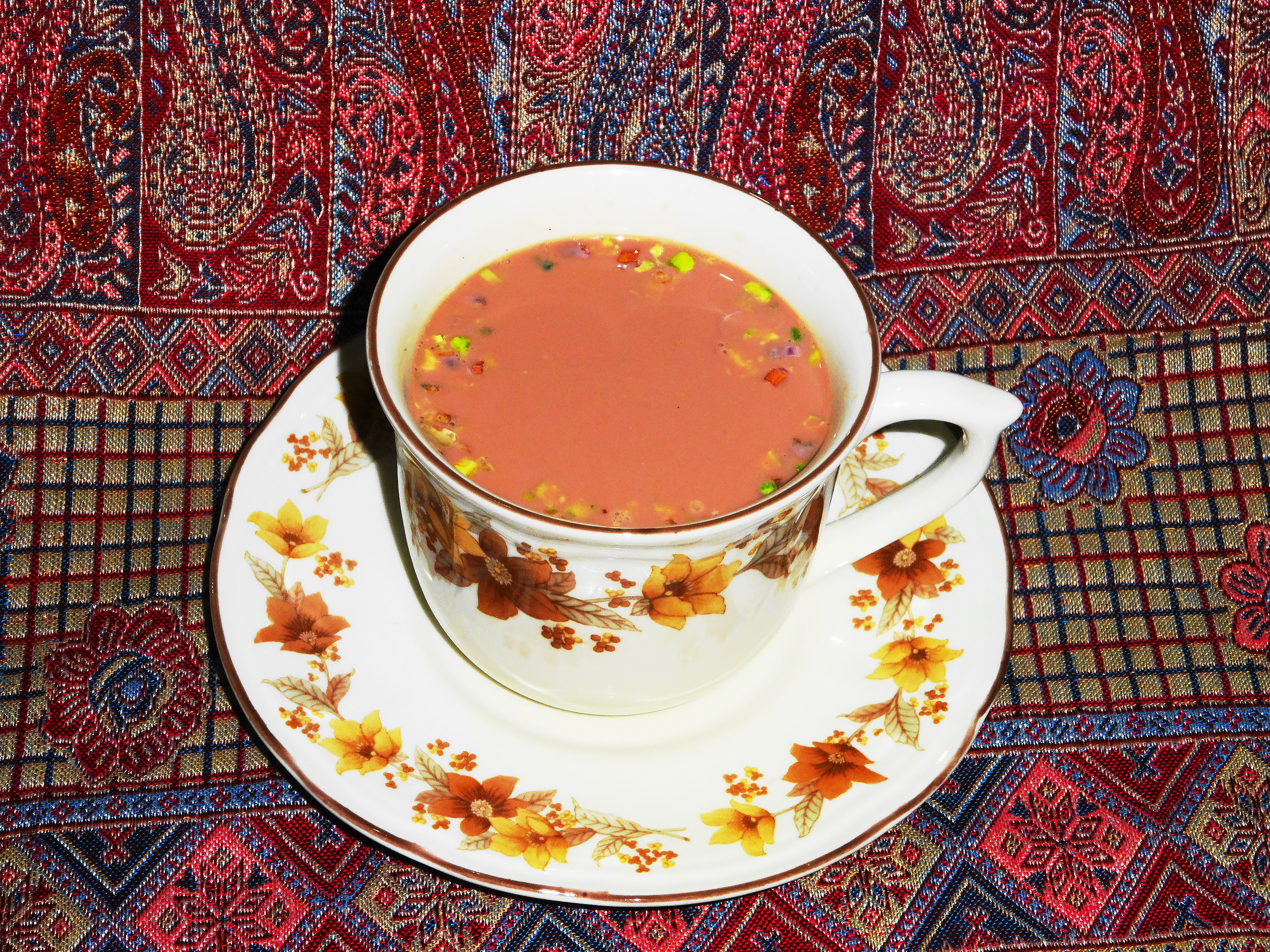
Kashmiri chai

Kashmiri Hindus refer to this Kashmiri tea as "Sheer chai". "Shir", the term from which "Sheer chai" is derived from, means "milk" in Persian.

"Tea pink" is also used as an adjective referencing the characteristic pink hue of the tea, such as to describe textiles.

== Preparation ==
Noon chai is traditionally made from green tea leaves, milk, salt and baking soda, and is usually cooked in a samavar. The leaves are boiled for about an hour with baking soda until it develops a burgundy colouration, then ice or cold water is added to "quench" it and make it stay that colour. When milk is added, it combines with the burgundy to yield its signature pink colour. It is then aerated by ladling out some of it and pouring it back into the pot to incorporate tiny air bubbles into it, a process that yields a froth and that may take hours to do by hand.

Sugar is not traditionally used in Kashmiri recipes, although newer commercial preparations in many restaurants around the world and tea stalls that serve Kashmiri cuisine may include sweeteners or exclude salt. In Pakistan, it is often served with sugar and nuts.

=== Chemistry ===
When tea leaves are boiled, polyphenols are extracted from the leaves into the water. In green teas like those used in Noon chai, the polyphenols extracted act similar to the substance phenol red, which changes color depending on the pH level of the substance it is in—yellow when it is acidic, and red when it is alkaline. Since Noon chai is boiled for a long time, a lot of color-changing polyphenols are extracted from the leaves. When alkaline baking soda (sodium bicarbonate) is added to it, the tea takes on its deep red color (which then turns pink with milk).

== History ==
=== Origin ===
Origin stories of the tea allege that it came from Yarkland (which later became Xinjiang, China) to India's Kashmir through the Silk Road. Noon chai originates from the Himalayas, where salt was added as an electrolyte to prevent dehydration at high altitudes. It is also related to other Central Asian salty milk teas, such as the Uyghur tea etkanchay and the Mongolian tea suutei tsai.

Pastoralists brew traditional Noon Chai while journeying on their transhumant migration in Jammu and Kashmir.

Use of alkaline salts, like baking soda, in tea originated from the Tibetan Plateau, where naturally occurring deposits of soda were used to darken po cha. Later, in Ladakh, hot spring soda crystals were used in local butter tea, or gur gur cha. Residents of Kashmir Valley adopted the practice from Ladakh, importing soda (called phul) from them and brick tea from Lhasa, then replacing yak butter with milk and cream to fit local tastes.

=== Cultural significance ===
Noon chai is popularly consumed numerous times per day in Kashmir, served with breads such as kulcha, girda, or tsochwor. Bakarwals prepare it during their migration on the routes between summer and winter pastures in Jammu and Kashmir, India.

Outside Kashmir it is also commonly sold in tea stalls and restaurants in parts of North India and Pakistan, sometimes in slightly sweeter commercial versions.

== See also ==
- Kahwah
- Kashmiri cuisine
- Butter tea
- Kulhar
- Masala chai
