= Kabuli pulao =

Central Asian dish

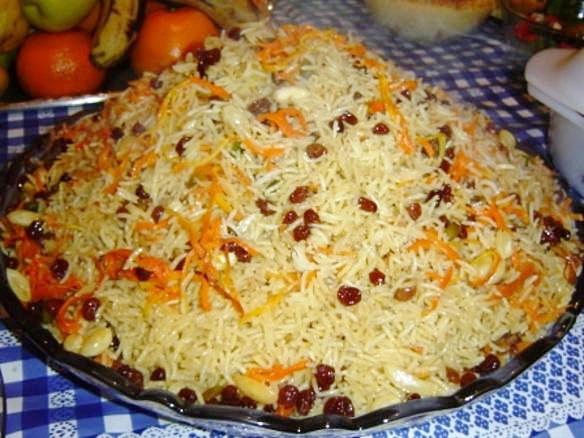
- Kabuli pulao
- Alternative names: Kabuli pulaw, Qabili palaw, Qabeli palao, Qabili Uzbaki, roz Bukhari, Bukhari rice
- Type: Rice
- Course: Lunch, dinner
- Place of origin: Afghanistan, Uzbekistan
- Region or state: Central Asia
- Associated cuisine: Afghan cuisine, Uzbek cuisine
- Serving temperature: Hot
- Main ingredients: Steamed rice, raisins, carrots, nuts and mutton, lamb or veal

Kabuli pulao (or pulaw) is a variety of pilaf made in Afghanistan and Uzbekistan. It is known in Afghanistan as Qābilī palaw, (Note: Dari: قابلی پلو, pronounced [qɑːbɪˈliː paˈlaw]) and in Uzbekistan as the Osh palov, (Note: pronounced [ɒʃ pɐˈlɒɸ]) with neither country referring to it by the name of a city. In English speaking countries, the dish tends to be known by the name Kabuli pulao, after the city of Kabul. In Saudi Arabia, it is known by the name Bukhari rice, (Note: Arabic: رز بخاري, romanized: ruzz Bukhārī) after the city of Bukhara.

The core ingredients are steamed rice mixed with caramelized carrots and raisins as well as marinated meat. Kabuli pulao is commonly garnished with almonds and pistachios. Saffron may be added to either the rice, the sauce or the garnishes. Varieties of Kabuli pulao have spread from Afghanistan to different parts of Western and Central Asia and Pakistan.

== Origin ==
Although referred to in English as "Kabuli" (see § Etymology), the dish did not originate in Kabul. More likely, the dish originated at the border of northern Afghanistan with Uzbekistan. Additionally, longstanding communities of northern Afghans and Central Asian émigrés in Saudi Arabia have collectively referred to themselves as "Bukharis" (despite not all being from Bukhara), and have marketed this dish in the region as "Bukhari rice".

A variation of Qabili made by Uzbeks within Afghanistan is also referred to as "Uzbeki palaw". The Uzbeki version differs from traditional Afghan palaw preparation in that it doesn't steam the rice (sof method), but instead boils the rice until all liquid has been absorbed (dampokht method). Palaw dishes form a specific and longstanding tradition of rice preparation in the region, likely dating back as far as Bactrian times.

== Etymology ==
"Kabuli" may be a misspelling of "Qabili", which comes from Persian قابل. The name "Qabili" appears to have been applied early on to a complex pilaf dish in Persian-language contexts, with the first written Qabili pilaf recipes appearing during the Safavid period in Ali Bavarchi's 1521 manuscript Kār-nāma ("The Manual"). This work currently constitutes the oldest cookbook in Persian.

"Pulao" arises from a common transcription of "pilaaf" across various languages. In Persian, پلو is often transcribed as "palao", "palaw", "palau", etc to reflect the Classical diphthong /aw/, which is preserved in Dari, and is otherwise often transcribed "polow" or "polo" to reflect Iranian dialects, which have largely lost the diphthong.

== Serving ==
Qabeli palaw is considered a festive and important dish due to the emphasis on quality of the ingredients, as well as being a widely known dish of Afghan cuisine. The dish may be served as a main course, accompanied by traditional side dishes or prepared as part of a banquet.
