= Kashmiri =

Kashmiri may refer to:

- People or things related to the Kashmir Valley or the broader region of Kashmir
- Kashmiris, an ethnic group native to the Kashmir Valley
  - Kashmiri Muslims
  - Kashmiri Hindus
  - Kashmiri Pandit
- Kashmiri Gujjars, ethnic group native to broader region of Kashmir
- Kashmiri language, the language of the Kashmiris ethnic group

== People with the name ==
- Kashmiri Saikia Baruah, Indian actress
- Abid Kashmiri (1947–2024), Pakistani actor and a comedian
- Agha Hashar Kashmiri (1879–1935), Urdu poet, playwright and dramatist
- Agha Shorish Kashmiri (1917–1975), Pakistani scholar and politician
- Amr Kashmiri (born 1987), Pakistani actor and musician
- Anwar Shah Kashmiri (1875–1933), Kashmiri Islamic scholar from former British India
- Aziz Kashmiri (1919–2010), Kashmiri journalist
- Hamidi Kashmiri (1932–2018), Indian poet and academic
- Ilyas Kashmiri (1964–2011), senior al-Qaeda operative
- Shahzad Kashmiri, Pakistani television and film director and cinematographer
- Kashmiri Lal Zakir (1919–2016), Indian writer
- MC Kash (born 1990), Kashmiri rapper
- Wisam Ahmad Kashmiri, fictional character in the 2013 Indian film Vishwaroopam

== See also ==
- Kashmir (disambiguation)
- Kashmiri cuisine
- Kashmiri culture
- Kashmiri literature
- Kashmiri proverbs
- Kashmiri Gate (disambiguation)
- "Kashmiri Song", a 1902 song by Amy Woodforde-Finden based on a poem by Laurence Hope
- Keshmiri
- Cashmere (disambiguation)
