= Cashmere =

Cashmere often refers to:

- Cashmere wool from the Cashmere goat
- Cashmere goat

Cashmere may also refer to:

== Geography ==
- Old alternative spelling of Kashmir, a northern region of the Indian subcontinent
- Cashmere, New Zealand, a suburb of Christchurch, New Zealand
- Cashmere, Queensland, a suburb of Brisbane, Australia
- Cashmere, Washington, a city in the United States

== Music ==
- Cashmere (band), a post-disco and soul music group
- Cashmere (Cashmere album)
- Cashmere (Swet Shop Boys album)
- "Cashmere", a song by Rita Ora

== Other ==
- Cashmere (painting), a painting by John Singer Sargent 1908
- Cashmere Biskit, a character from animated TV series Littlest Pet Shop
- Cashmere, a brand of toilet paper sold by Kruger Inc.
- Cashmere (given name), the given name

== See also ==
- Cashmere Cat (born 1987), Norwegian musician
- "Pink Cashmere", a song by Prince
- Kashmir (disambiguation)
