= Kashmir (disambiguation) =

Kashmir mainly refers to the northwestern region of the Indian subcontinent claimed by China, India, and Pakistan.

Kashmir may also refer to:

== Kashmir region ==
- Kashmir Valley, the largest valley in Jammu and Kashmir
- Kashmir Division, is a revenue and administrative division containing the Kashmir Valley region of Jammu and Kashmir
- Jammu and Kashmir (princely state), former princely state in British India from 1846 to 1947
- Jammu and Kashmir (state), former state in India from 1947 to 2019, divided into two union territories in 2019
- Jammu and Kashmir (union territory), a union territory in India after 2019, part of Indian-administered Kashmir
- Ladakh, a union territory in India after 2019, part of Indian-administered Kashmir
- Azad Kashmir, a nominally self-governing province in Pakistan, part of Pakistani-administered Kashmir
- Gilgit-Baltistan, an administrative territory in Pakistan, part of Pakistani-administered Kashmir
- Aksai Chin, region administered partly as Xinjiang province and partly as Tibet, part of Chinese-administered Kashmir
- Trans-Karakoram Tract, region administered as a part of Xinjiang, part of Chinese-administered Kashmir

== Other places ==
- Kashmir, Iran, a village in Hormozgan province, Iran (not to be confused with Kashmar, a city in Razavi Khorasan Province)

== Music ==
- Kshmr, born Niles Hollowell-Dhar, Kashmiri-American DJ and record producer (formerly of The Cataracs)
- Kashmir (Danish band), rock band from Denmark
- Kashmir (Pakistani band), rock band from Karachi, Pakistan
- "Kashmir" (song), 1975 song by rock band Led Zeppelin
- Kashmir: Symphonic Led Zeppelin, tribute album to Led Zeppelin
- "Kashmir", instrumental track by Scooter from Back to the Heavyweight Jam

== Other uses ==
- Kashmir (horse), a thoroughbred racehorse
- HMS Kashmir (F12), World War 2, Royal Navy destroyer
- Kashmeeram (Kashmir), a 1994 Indian Malayalam-language action by Rajiv Anchal

== See also ==
- Jammu and Kashmir (disambiguation)
- Kasmir (disambiguation)
- Cashmere (disambiguation)
- Kashmiri (disambiguation)
- Kashmore (disambiguation)
- Kasmira Kingdom, a kingdom mentioned in ancient Indian literature
