= LimeLife =

American multi-level marketing company

LimeLife Inc. is an American privately held digital media company based in the San Francisco Bay Area.

== History ==
LimeLife was founded in 2005 as a mobile publisher in the U.S. exclusively focused on the women's market. LimeLife’s mobile content is distributed through the major wireless carriers in the U.S. and includes games, lifestyle applications and text alerts, and fashion wallpapers.

In December 2007, LimeLife was selected as one of Red Herring's 100 most innovative companies in the world.

In 2008, LimeLife expanded its product offering to include openly accessible lifestyle content across multiple platforms: web, mobile web, and widgets.

LimeLife's website now redirects users to the Total Beauty Media website.
