= Cashmere (given name) =

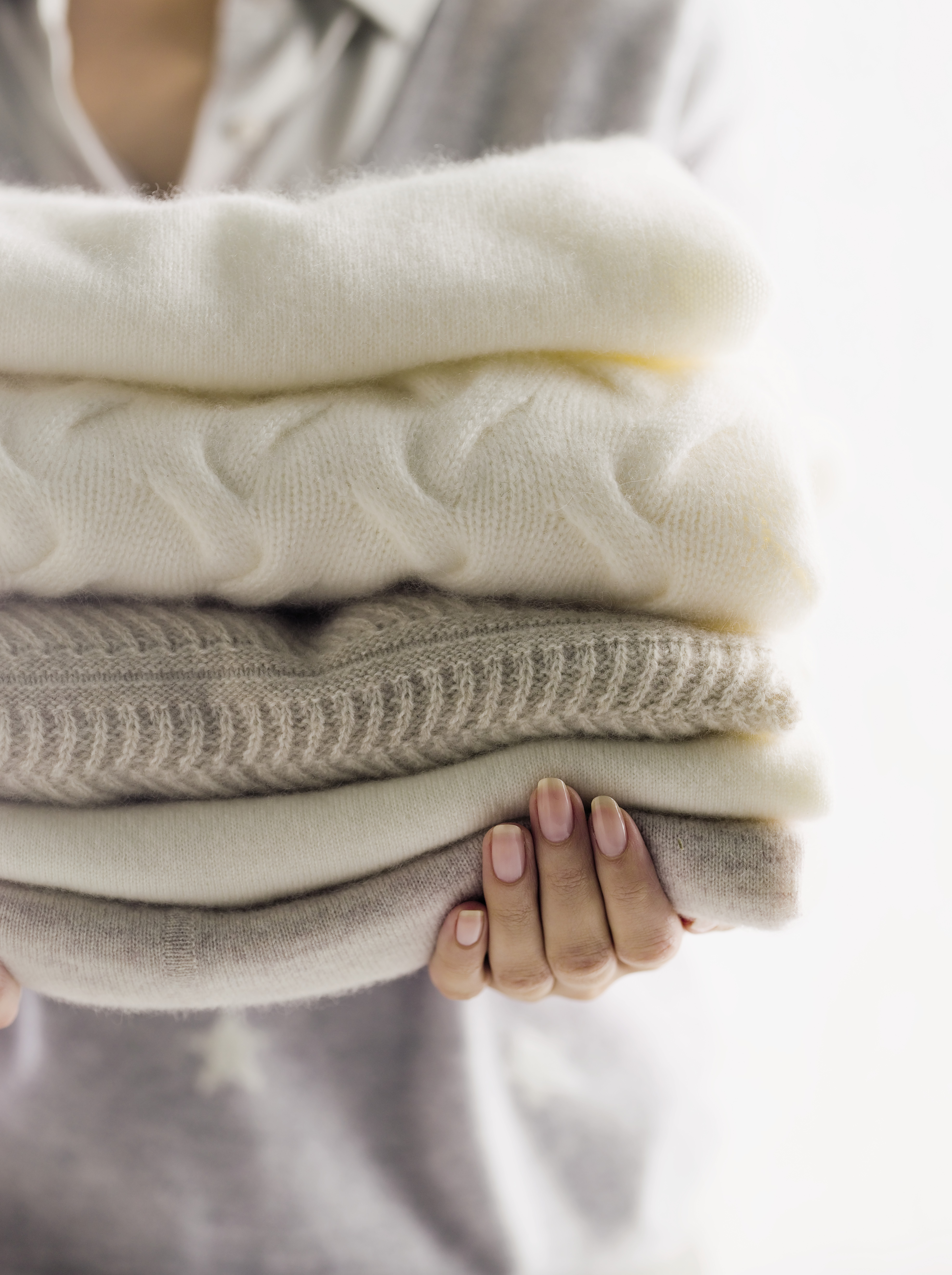
- Cashmere wool is a luxury fabric.
- Gender: Unisex
- Language: English

Origin
- Meaning: Cashmere wool

Cashmere is a given name derived from the wool, which has a luxurious image. The name is also a surname.

== Usage ==
The name is in occasional use for both boys and girls in the United States. In 2022, the most recent year for which statistics were available, 42 newborn American boys and 19 newborn American girls were given the name Cashmere. Another 63 newborn American boys and 19 American newborn girls were given the name Kashmere, a spelling variant. There were 179 newborn American boys and 20 newborn American girls called Kashmir. The Cashmere goat, a type of goat whose wool is used to produce cashmere wool, gets its name from the Himalayan region of Kashmir.

== Men ==
- Cashmere Wright (born 1990), former American basketball player

== Women ==
- Cashmere Nicole Carillo (born circa 1984), American entrepreneur and founder of the beauty brand Beauty Bakerie
