= Kashmore (disambiguation) =

Kashmore is a city in Sindh, Pakistan.

Kashmore may also refer to:

- Kashmore District, an administrative unit of Sindh, Pakistan
- Kashmore Taluka, a tehsil of Kashmore District

== See also ==
- Kashmora (1986 film), an Indian film
- Kaashmora, an Indian film
- Kashmir (disambiguation)
- Kashmar, in Iran
