= Total Beauty Media =

Total Beauty Media, based in Los Angeles, operates totalbeauty.com, which provides beauty tips, news, reviews, and reporting on beauty industry trends.

== History ==
The company was founded in 2007 by Emrah Kovacoglu, a former Procter & Gamble digital media executive. Kovacoglu’s vision was to create an online destination where women could learn about and review cosmetic products, thereby attracting advertisers from the beauty industry.

By February 2008, the company raised $10 million from Wallington Investments and U.S. Venture Partners.

In March 2015, the company was acquired by Evolve Media.

== Portfolio ==
Total Beauty Media's publishing portfolio included its flagship website, TotalBeauty.com, and other beauty and lifestyle websites, including BeautyRiot, KateLuxe and ModernMan. As part of its growth strategy, Total Beauty Media acquired LimeLife, a women's lifestyle portal in August 2010. It launched a web show in 2012.

== See also ==
- QVC Beauty
- Beauty Bakerie
