= Kashmiri cuisine =

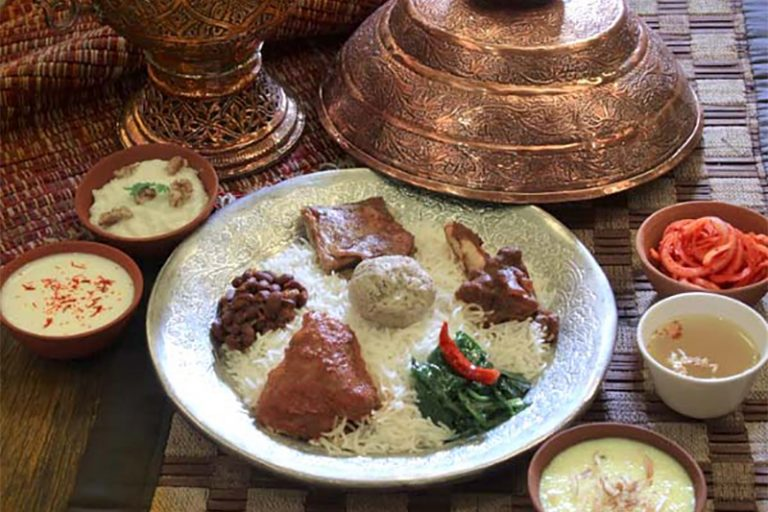
The thirty-six course meal, Kashmiri wazwan

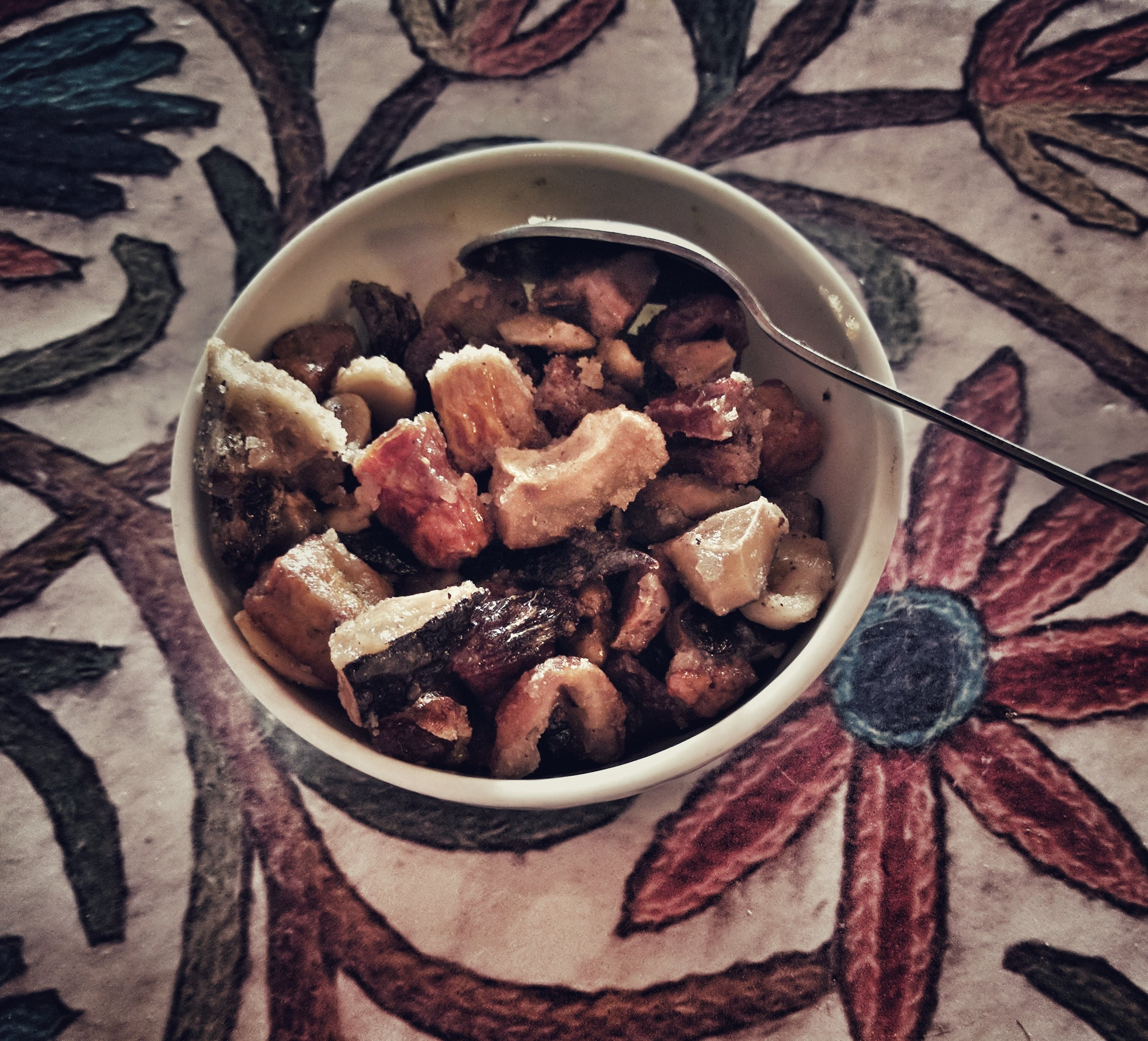
Shufta, a Kashmiri dessert, at a pandit restaurant in New Delhi.

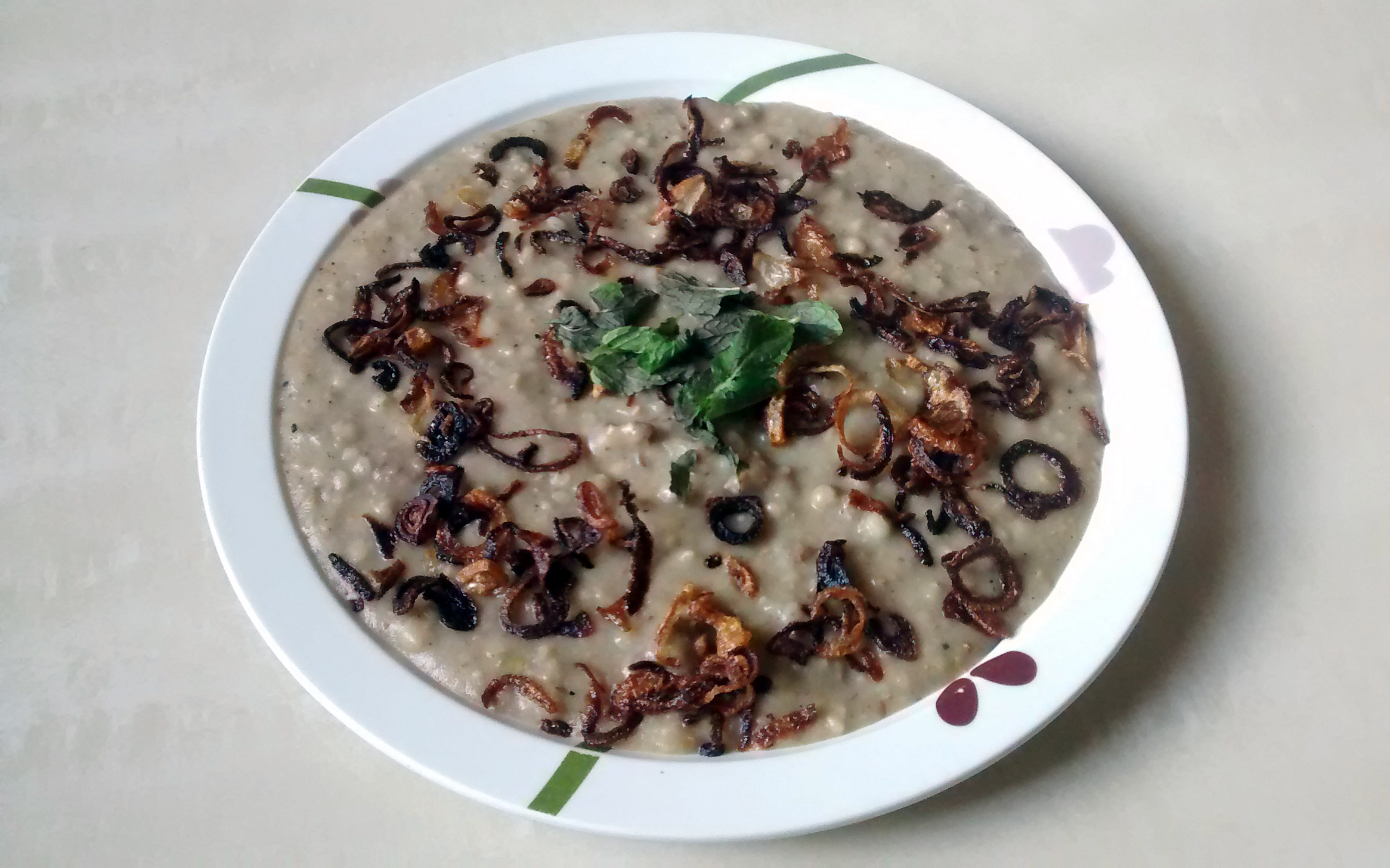
Harisse or Harissa, a meaty staple

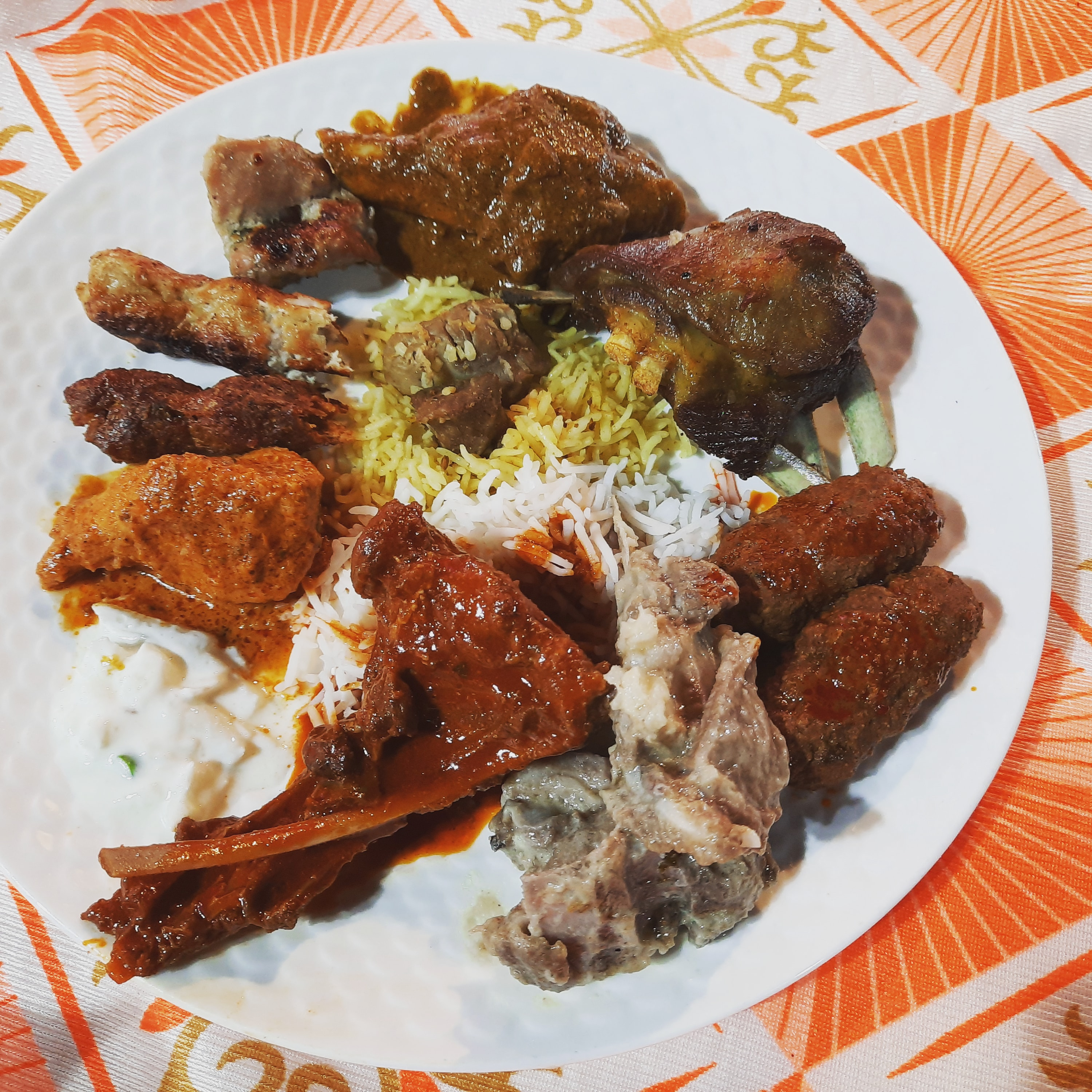
Kashmiri Pandit platter

Kashmiri cuisine is the traditional culinary practices of the Kashmiri people. Rice has been a staple food in Kashmir since ancient times. The equivalent for the phrase "bread and butter" in the Kashmiri language is haakh-batte (greens and rice).

Kashmiri cuisine is generally meat-heavy. The region has, per capita, the highest mutton consumers in the Indian Subcontinent. Lamb or sheep is the preferred choice of meat amongst Pandits, whereas Muslims prefer goats.

In a majority of Kashmiri cooking, bread is not part of the meal. Bread is generally only eaten with tea in the morning, afternoon and evening. The cooking methods of vegetables, mutton, homemade cheese (paneer), and legumes by Muslims are similar to those of Pandits, except in the use of onions, garlic and shallots by Muslims in place of asafoetida. Cockscomb flower, called "mawal" in Kashmiri, is boiled to prepare a red food colouring, as used in certain dishes mostly in Wazwan. Kashmiri Pandit cuisine uses the mildly pungent Kashmiri red chili powder as a spice, as well as ratanjot to impart colour to certain dishes like rogan josh. Kashmiri Muslim cuisine uses chilies in moderate quantity, and avoid hot dishes at large meals. In Kashmiri Muslim cuisine, vegetable curries are common with meat traditionally considered an expensive indulgence. Wazwan dishes with rice, some vegetables and salad are prepared for weddings and special occasions like Eid.

== History ==
From the Mahabharata to the Iranian invasion of Kashmir (which was a part of Gandhara) by Darius in 516 BC, to the Mauryans who established Srinagara to the Kushan Empire to the invasion of Kashmir by Timur in 1398, the culture and cuisine of Kashmiris are linked to South Asia, Persian and Central Asian cuisines mixed with local innovations and availabilities of ingredients. The cuisine of Kashmir developed in response to the region's cold climate and long winters, contributing to the widespread use of slow-cooked dishes, dried vegetables, and preserved ingredients. The term kabab is Arabic in origin, korma has Turkish roots, and rogan josh, yakhaen, ab gosht, riste and goshtabh stem from Persian sources.

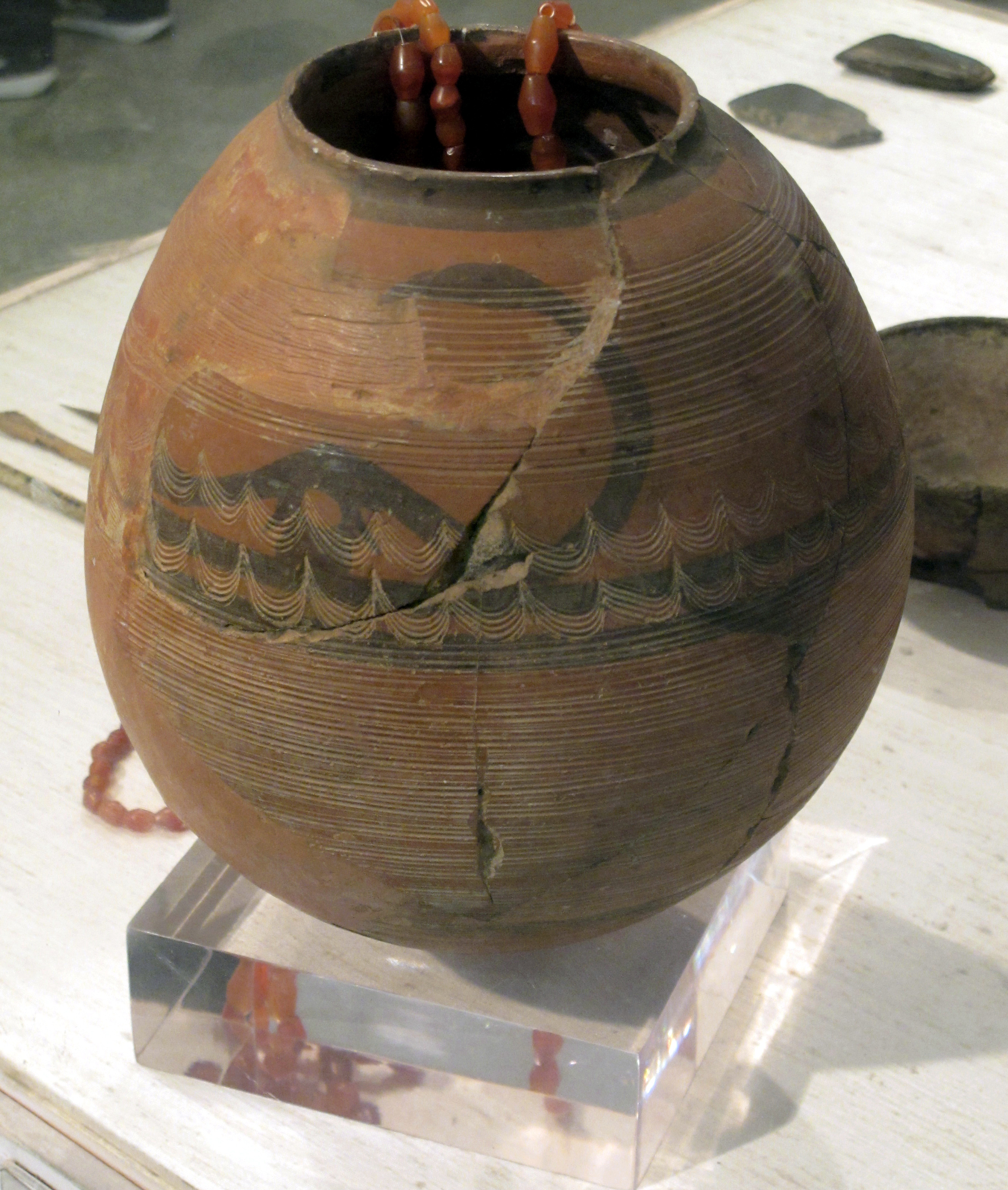
Red-ware pottery with horned figure from Burzahom.

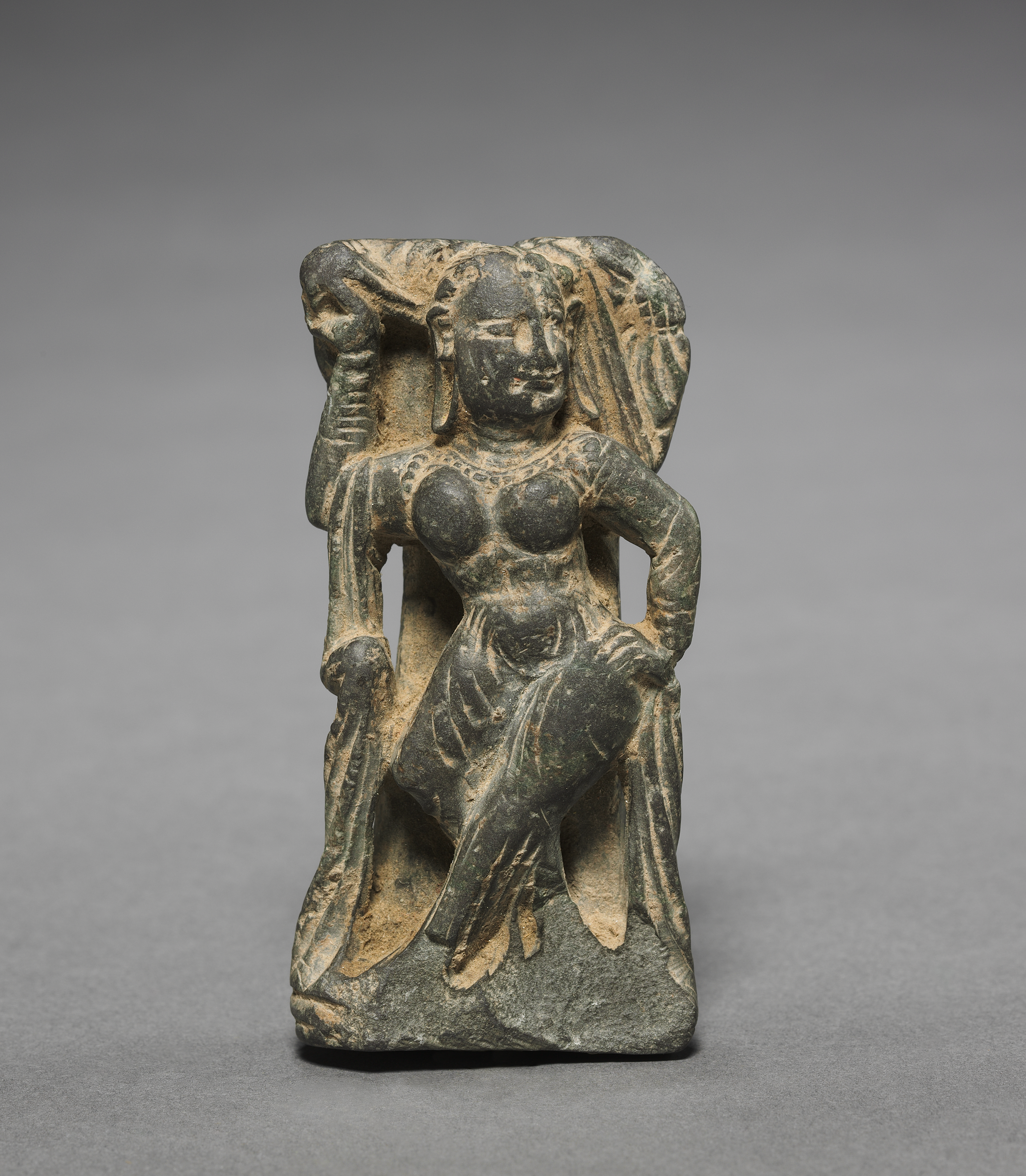
Kashmiri Woman and Tree (300s – 400s), her fertile properties cause the tree to fruit.

=== Early history ===
There is a legend that aeons ago Kashmir valley was a vast mountain lake. The soil contains remains of fresh-water fish and fossil-oysters and the black shells of water chestnut may be found in layers embedded in the earth at a height of 457 metres above the level of the valley.

=== Paleolithic age ===
The process of Kashmir's amalgamation with outer world commenced with the importation of primitive forms of snake and fire worship from Iran. Since Paleolithic times, serpents were worshipped and buried with a supply of insects in their graves as a provision for their future life. In addition, they splashed grains at shrines and graves to express regard unto snakes and other animals. Bommai Sopore archaeological site, discovered by Dr Mamtaz Yatoo in 2005, has a prehistoric rock engraving, the first of its kind found in Kashmir. This Upper Paleolithic engraving depicts chase and game engagements of the prehistoric population. Recent investigations by archaeologists at Overa valley of Pahalgam have revealed stone tools of Paleolithic ages, including single-edged stone blades used for preying of animals.

=== Neolithic culture ===
Even before the Megalithic culture that followed the Neolithic period, there is evidence of wheat, barley and lentil cultivation. Clear evidence for agriculture in the form of large domestic storages of grain and rachises of wheat and barley, as well as millets, were found after 2500 BC in Qasim Bagh in Kashmir. The Kashmir Valley contains multiple sites of the so-called Northern Neolithic, possibly dating as early as 3000 BC when climate became warmer. Excavations from Pethpuran Teng suggest a wider network of contact of this early population, and a significantly deeper time transition of broom-corn millets across the Inner Asian mountains. The date range returned from the lentil samples at Pethpuran Tang represent one of the earliest dated pulse crops from the region (c. 2700 BC). While the valley is altitudinally comparable to other inter-montane agro-pastoralist sites in Central Asia, Kashmir's slightly lower latitude presented the valley as a geographic threshold where crops could be grown without the necessary introgression of traits allowing their cultivation in higher and more northerly regions.

The range of tools recovered at the Neolithic site of Burzahom, in the district of Srinagar shows the men were skilled hunters with knowledge of implements for cultivation. Stone hearths have been found at ground levels, near the mouth of pits. The Period II (Ceramic Neolithic) structures show a dish with a hollow stand and a globular pot. Rectangular harvesters with a curved cutting edge have also been recovered. Presence of harpoons indicates fishing. The art-producing behaviour of Neolithic men is witnessed in a hunting scene, with human, a dog and a sun path diagram. Mortar and pestle characterised by a rectangular cross-section are made of the same volcanic rock as used by the current Kashmiris. The presence of lentil explains that the people of Burzahom had wide contacts with Central Asia. Harvesters (both in stone and bone) with two holes for handling it indicate contacts with China.

At the Gufkral Neolithic site 41 km southwest of Srinagar, archaeologists have confirmed settlers were engaged in wild game as well as domestication of animals. The animals that were known at the time were wild sheep, wild goat, wild cattle, red deer, wolf, Himalayan Ibex and bear. Roasting of food (both flesh and grain) was done only outside as no hearths or fireplaces were found inside the dwelling pits. Piercers were used for making incisions and for tearing open the flesh after the animal was killed and skinned, scrapers were used to scrape fat from the flesh. In the Phase IB of Neolithic occupation, some new additions included cattle and common peas. Pig (sus scrofa) and fish made their appearance in the late Neolithic period. Bones of hare (lepus), hedgehog, rodents and beaver were also recovered.

On the basis of the presence of emmer wheat (Triticum dicoccum) at Kanispur, seven kilometres east of Baramulla, contact of Harappans with the Neolithic Kashmir has been suggested. With the Aryan migration to Kashmir around the 8th century BC, the fire worship cult got embedded into the innate religio-cultural texture of Kashmir through practices such as a phallic emblem of cooked rice. The local ceremony of vayuk is again near to the Iranian style of Farvadin. On a special day of the month, Kashmiri Muslims remember their dead, visit their graves and distribute loaves of rice.

=== Indo-Greek and Kushana period ===
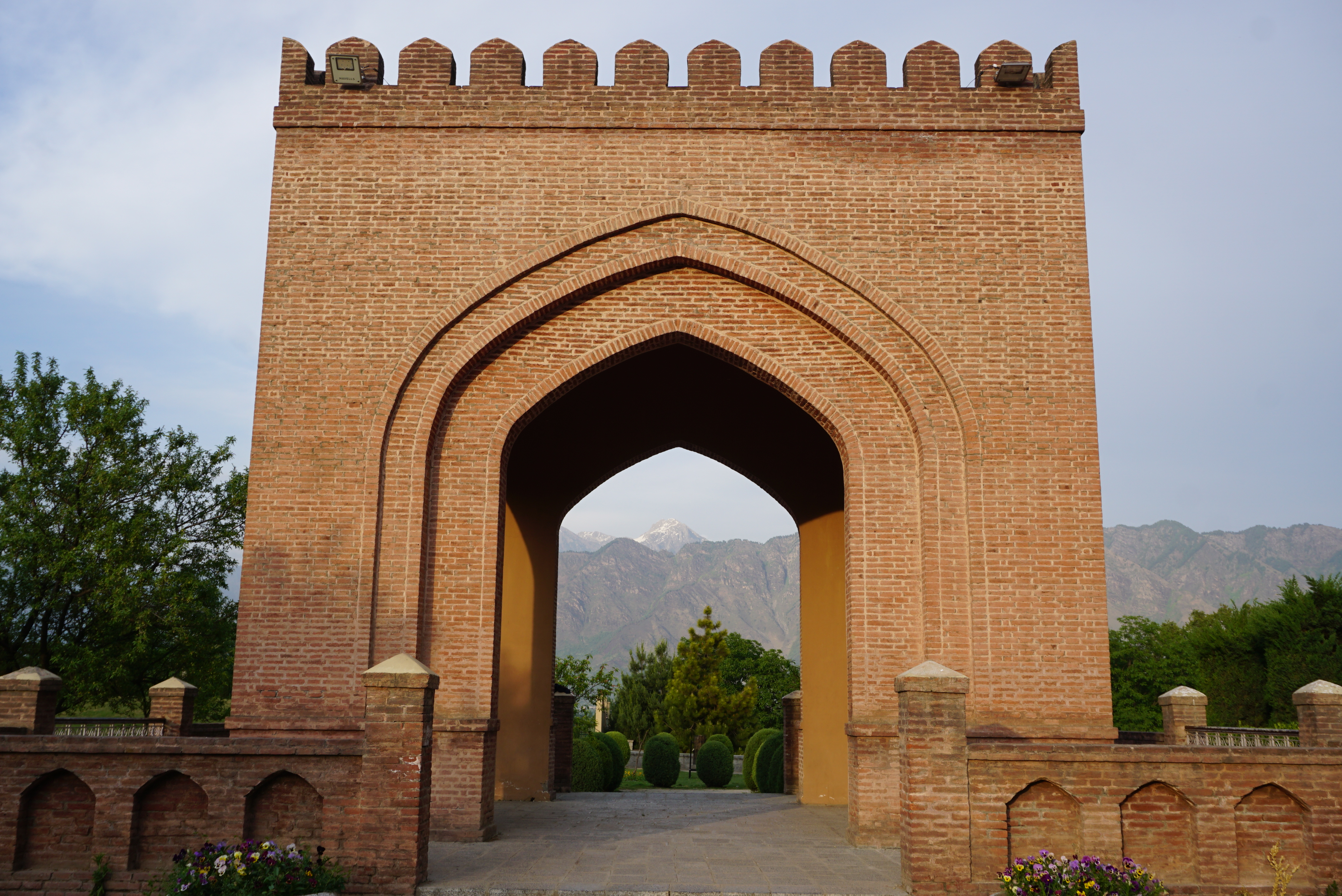
Badamwari Garden in Kashmir is known for its almond blossoms. The almond (prunus amygdalus) tree has an ancient history in the Kashmir valley.

Earthen thalis (pans) have been found at Semthan, north of Bijbehara from the Indo-Greek period (200 BC – 1st century AD). Handis (metal pots), flat plates, pedestalled cups and edged bowls have been reported in large numbers from the excavated sites of Harwan, Kanispur and Semthan. At Kanispur, cooking pots have been found. Kushan coins have been recovered in large numbers from the Kashmir valley with those of Kanishka continuing to emulate Vima's motif of king sacrificing at an altar.

The Kushan period is characterised by a double-cropping pattern, suggesting a change in agricultural practices associated with a population recovery following a post-Neolithic decline. Finds of Vitis vinifera (Common Grape Vine), Emblica officinalis (Indian Gooseberry), Ziziphus nummularia (Wild Jujube), Juglans regia (English Walnut) and Prunus amygdalus (Almond) suggest that horticulture and foraging played an important role in the diet of the occupants. The Kushan remains from Kanispur are dominated by barley, in contrast to Semthan where wheat is more common.

The Kushana history tells us that right from the days of the Kushana rulers (1st century AD – 450 AD) there were contacts between Romans and Kashmir. Kashmir was connected to the southern silk route via Gilgit and Yasin valley at Tashkurghan. The main items of export to Rome were saffron and dolomiaea costus (kutha). Dolomiaea costus was used in Rome for various purposes, among which for scenting of food and seasoning of wine.

=== Hindu dynasties ===
There were military contacts between the Karkota kingdom in Kashmir and the Tang (618 AD – 907 AD) court in China. When the Chinese Tang Dynasty successfully defeated the Tibetan forces and entered little Palur in October 722 AD, Kashmir was credited for providing agricultural supplies essential to sustaining the Chinese troops stationed in Gilgit valley.

=== Kashmir Sultanate (1346 – 1580s) ===
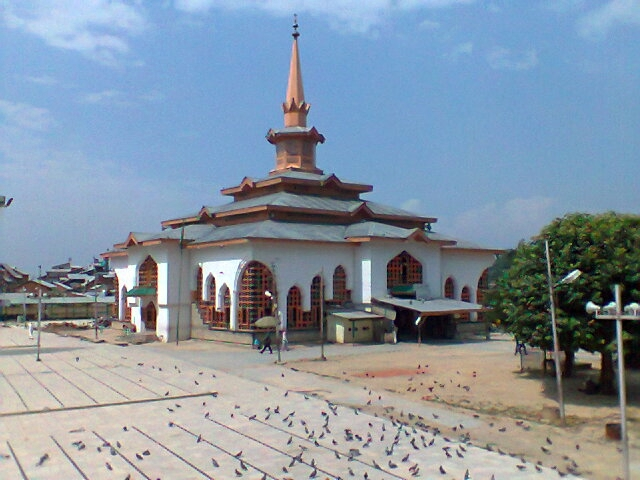
Shrine of Sufi saint Nund Reshi

Since Islam did not directly arrive from Arabia to Kashmir, it naturally carried with it mixed Iranian and Central Asian influences. Similarly, the Kashmiri Hindus were doing things which would have frightened orthodox Hindus from India. They drank water brought by a Muslim, ate food that was cooked in a Muslim boat and even Muslim foster-mothers were allowed to feed their children. Hence, the rishi cult identified with Hinduism in subscribing to vegetarianism, non-injury to animals and abstaining from the use of garlic and onion in food. Nund Rishi, according to a legend, subsisted on a diet of dried dandelion leaves and Lal Ded preached and practised strict vegetarianism.

Moreover, when Yusuf Shah Chak, the last sovereign king of Kashmir signed a treaty with emperor Akbar recognising his symbolic sovereignty in 1586 one of the terms was that the mint, the saffron and game would remain under imperial control.

=== Mughals (1580s – 1750s) ===
In Srinagar, poor people's meals were made of ghee, milk, beef, onions, wine, pickles, and vinegar. Rice, fish, and numerous vegetables were staple foods during the Mughal era. Butter and fats were not widely used in cooking since they were believed to be dangerous owing to the cold environment. The river water was not drunk by the people of South Kashmir. They drank Dal Lake water, which was warm, pleasant, and easily digestible.

In 1635–36, during Shahjahan's reign, a violent conflict flared up between the Shias and Sunnis when a group of both the sections were eating mulberries at Maisuma and some were accused of using indecent words against Muhammad. In 1641, unprecedented floods followed by a famine rendered the villages desolate. Shahjahan sent 30,000 rupees to the subedar Tarbiyat Khan to be distributed among the destitute in Srinagar and also ordered that five centres should be opened in the valley to provide free food to the needy.

=== Sikh Rule (1819–1846) ===
Cow slaughter was declared a crime punishable by death and many people accused of killing cows were publicly hanged. Owing to the shortsighted policy of the rulers Kashmír witnessed an acute agrarian crisis. Sikh rulers imposed one half of the paddy production as a share of the government. The population of Kashmir decreased from 800,000 in 1822–1823 to 120,000 in 1835.

=== Dogra Rule (1846–1947) ===
Coarse rice and haakh constituted the main food. Where paddy cultivation was restricted due to uneven terrain and lack of irrigation facilities, wheat and maize constituted the main items of food. In certain parts of Kashmir they lived on aquatic products such as singhara (water nuts).

Kashmiri apples were carried by coolies on their backs over 12 days to Rawalpindi in British India.

The famine of 1878–79 was deadly. Also, catching and eating of fish by men driven by hunger was made unlawful by an edict during the reign of Maharaja Ranbir Singh. Often anyone who killed a cow was boiled in oil and the hung from a hook which was fixed on to a pole in a public place. People did not possess any right to waste land and the only right which the villager had was that he could plant trees on such lands, and was the owner of the trees and not of land. Milk and butter was often taken away from gujjars (nomadic herdsmen) without payment by the officials.

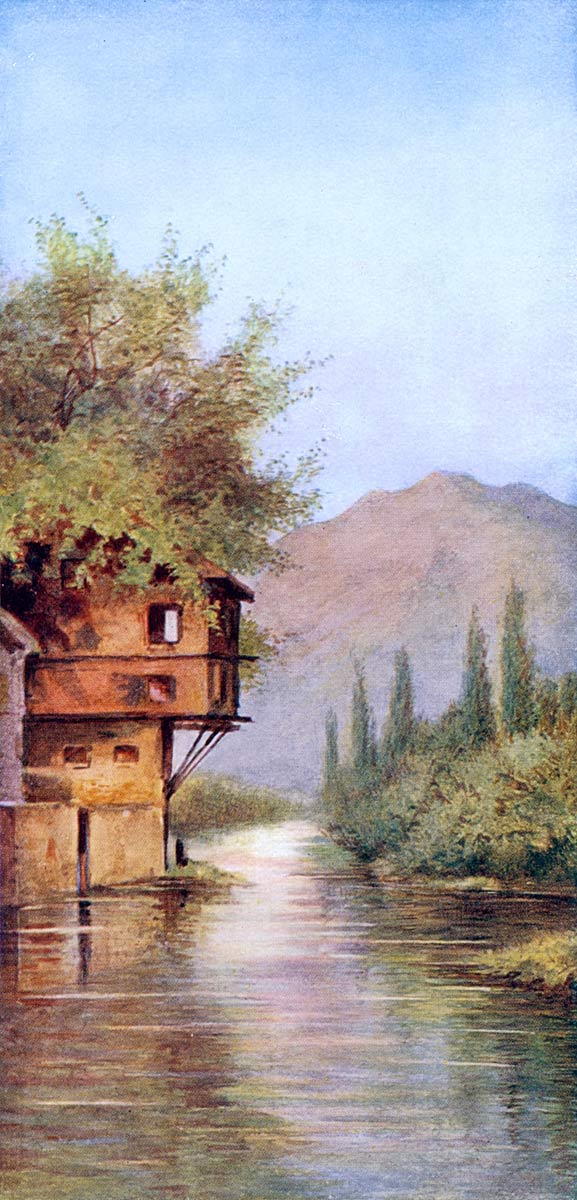
Six Artistic views of Kashmir by unidentified British painter. Sultan Zain-ul-Abidin built canals to promote agriculture.

== Ingredients and seasoning ==
=== Meat ===
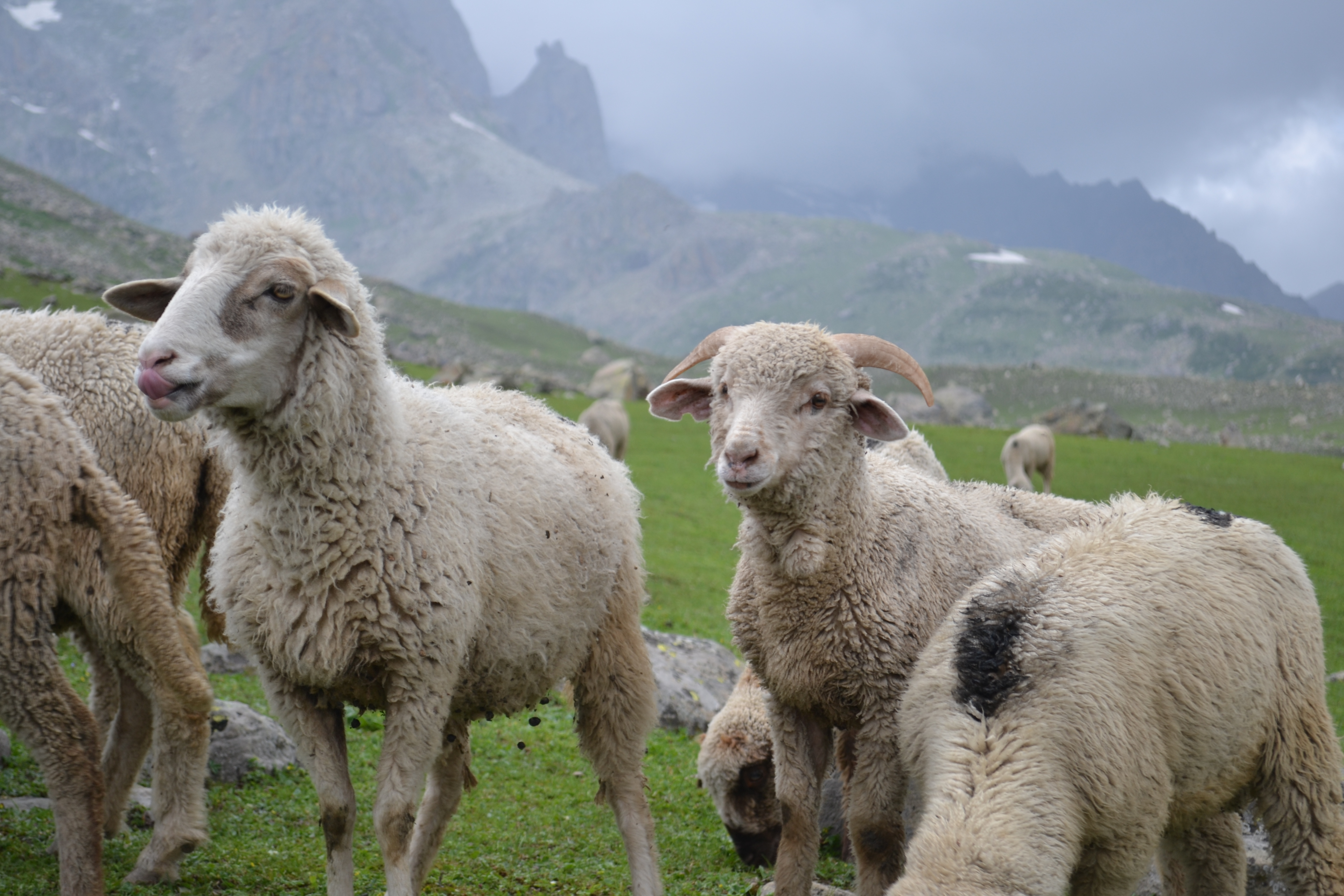
Local sheep in Gangabal

Apart from chicken, fish and game, Kashmiris use only mutton (meat of mature sheep) or goat's meat. More than 75% of sheep population are cross breeds and are generally called Kashmir Merino that provides the dual purpose of meat and wool. The Bakkarwal (nomadic herders) goats belong to the rare Kaghani breed, prized as one of the world's best in terms of meat.

Beef is consumed in towns and villages of Kashmir more so for its affordability. In some villages, beef-eaters are huddled separately from those supposed to be served mutton during wazwan feasts. There is a class divide between people who eat kat maaz ("small meat", mutton) considered elite and more sophisticated, and those who eat bad maaz ("big meat", beef), considered lower-class. The biggest rabbit breeding farm in North India sprawls on six hectares of land in Wussan village of Baramulla district of Kashmir.> The consumption of rabbit meat as a substitute for sheep and goat meat among the general masses is becoming popular. People with cardiac problems eat rabbits as the meat is considered lean and white with high nutritious value.

The local geese of Kashmir (Kashmir Aenz) is the first and only recognised domestic geese breed in India. Goose rearing in the Valley dates back to ancient times as has been mentioned by Sir Walter R. Lawrence in his book 'The Valley of Kashmir'. In Srinagar, geese are mainly sold in Batmaloo and Lal Chowk, by vendors, who purchase geese from rearers in villages and sell them live or slaughtered in the city. In affluent families, geese pickles are made and kept aside for winter use.

=== Fish ===
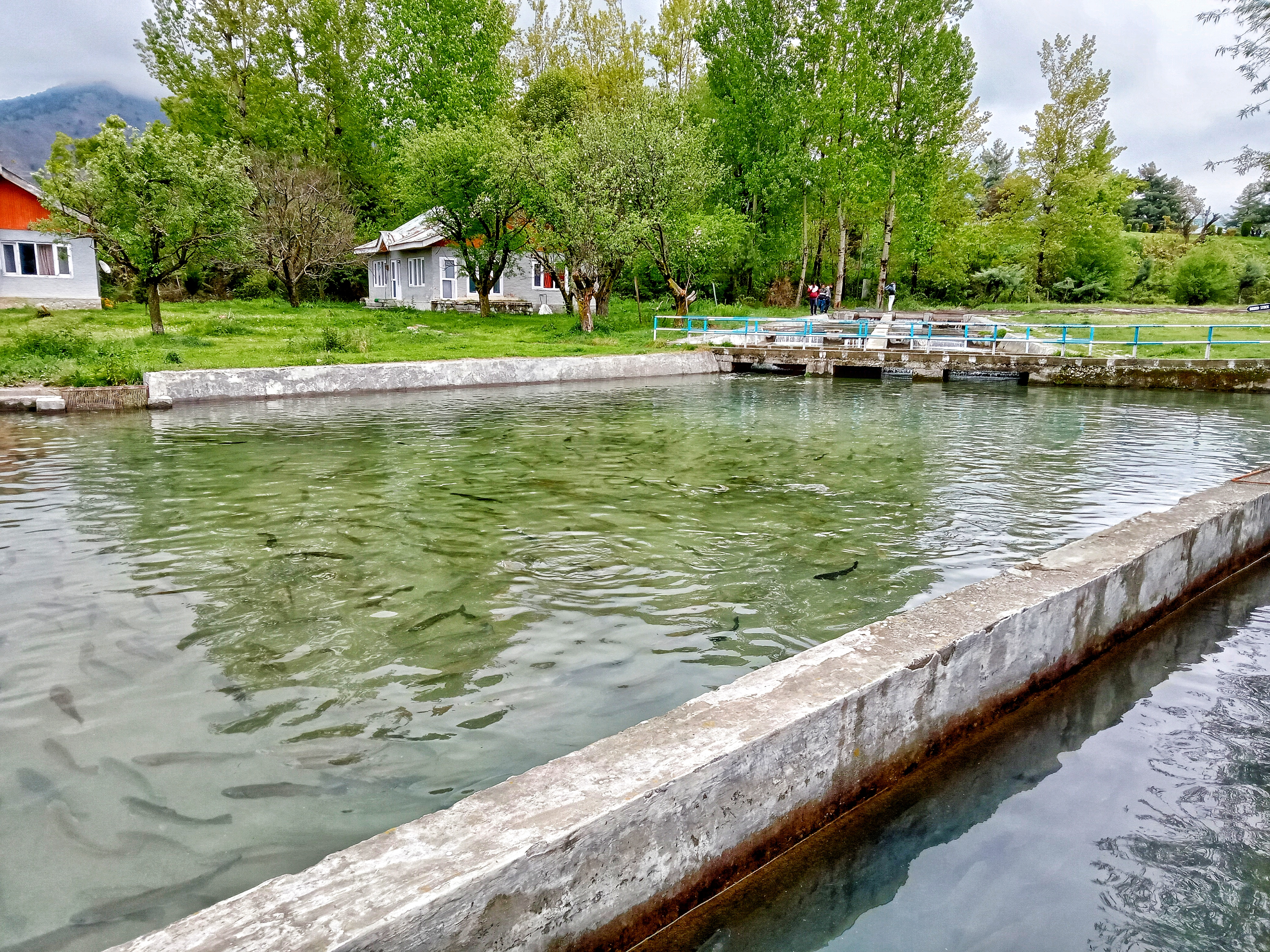
Rainbow and brown trout farm at Kokernag

The Duke of Bedford helped to send 10,000 trout eggs from the UK in 1899 but they perished on the way. A second consignment arrived from Scotland the next year. The rainbow and brown trout adapted well to the Kashmir valley. Locally known as alegaad, it can be found in both standing and flowing water bodies throughout the valley. There were 137 private fish farms in just Anantnag district, which was declared as the 'Trout District of India'.. Snow trout have been in decline due to pollution and habitat loss despite efforts to restock via hatcheries.

=== Eggs ===
Poultry farms are set on European standards, as Kashmir has similar geo-climatic conditions. Using permaculture and no-dig gardening technique, free-range eggs are being sold every day. People collect chick varieties like Kalinga brown, Vanraja, Kashmir Commercial Layer, etc. to dish out a regular supply of organic brown eggs. The Kashmir Duck (batook) is reared for its eggs in all districts of the valley with highest population in Bandipora district, followed by Kupwara, Barmulla, Srinagar and others. Eggs of Kashmir duck are either white or green-shelled and weigh 66.20 g on average.

Kalij pheasant (wan kokur) lays between 6 and 10 eggs per clutch, and are perfect served soft-boiled in their olive-green shells with a mere sprinkle of celery salt and buttered soldiers.

=== Cereals ===
People in Kashmir eat different varieties of rice including the nutty and fragrant Mushk Budji, grown in the higher reaches of the Kashmir valley. In February 2022, Mushk Budji rice got the Geographical Indication (GI) tag. This cooked rice is unique and possesses a harmonious blend of taste, aroma and rich organoleptic properties. Kashmiri red rice, locally called Zaag Batt, is grown in a small village called Tangdhar on the border with Pakistan. The small unpolished grains are sought for their superior texture and taste. In 2009, farmers in the region harvested the legendary Basmati rice for the first time.

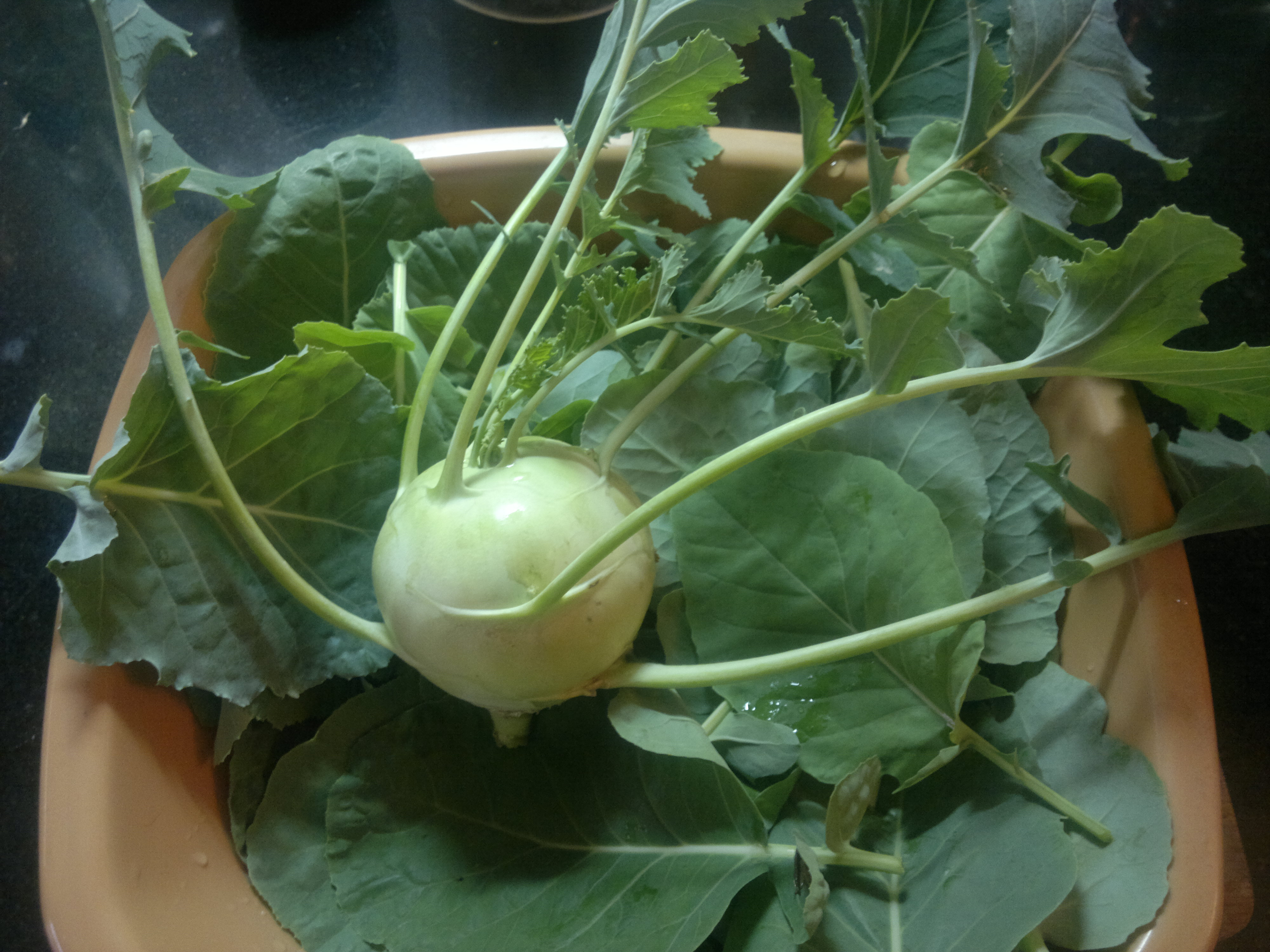
Monje Haakh (kohlrabi).

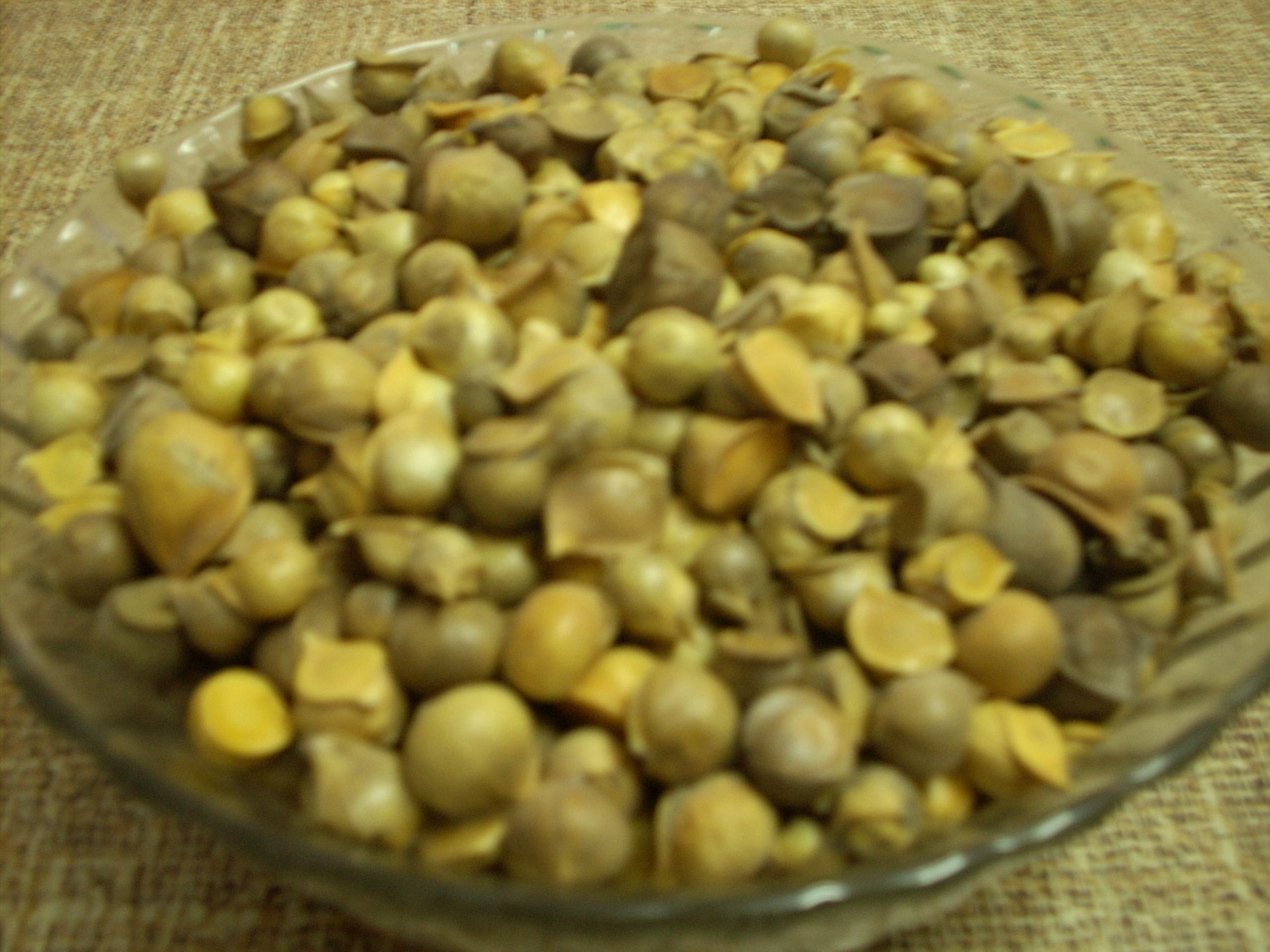
Kashmiri garlic

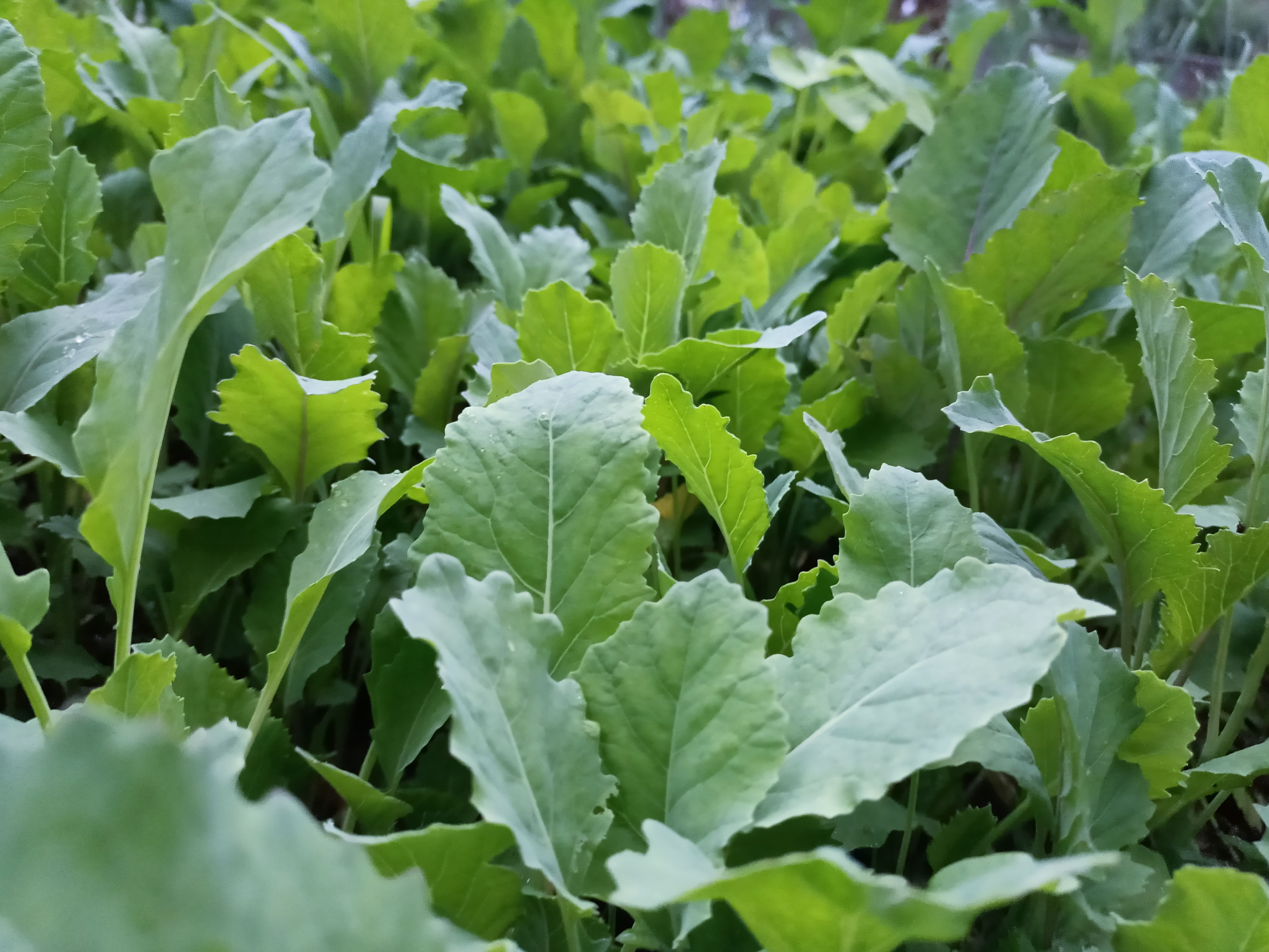
Koshur haakh, local collard greens.

=== Vegetables ===
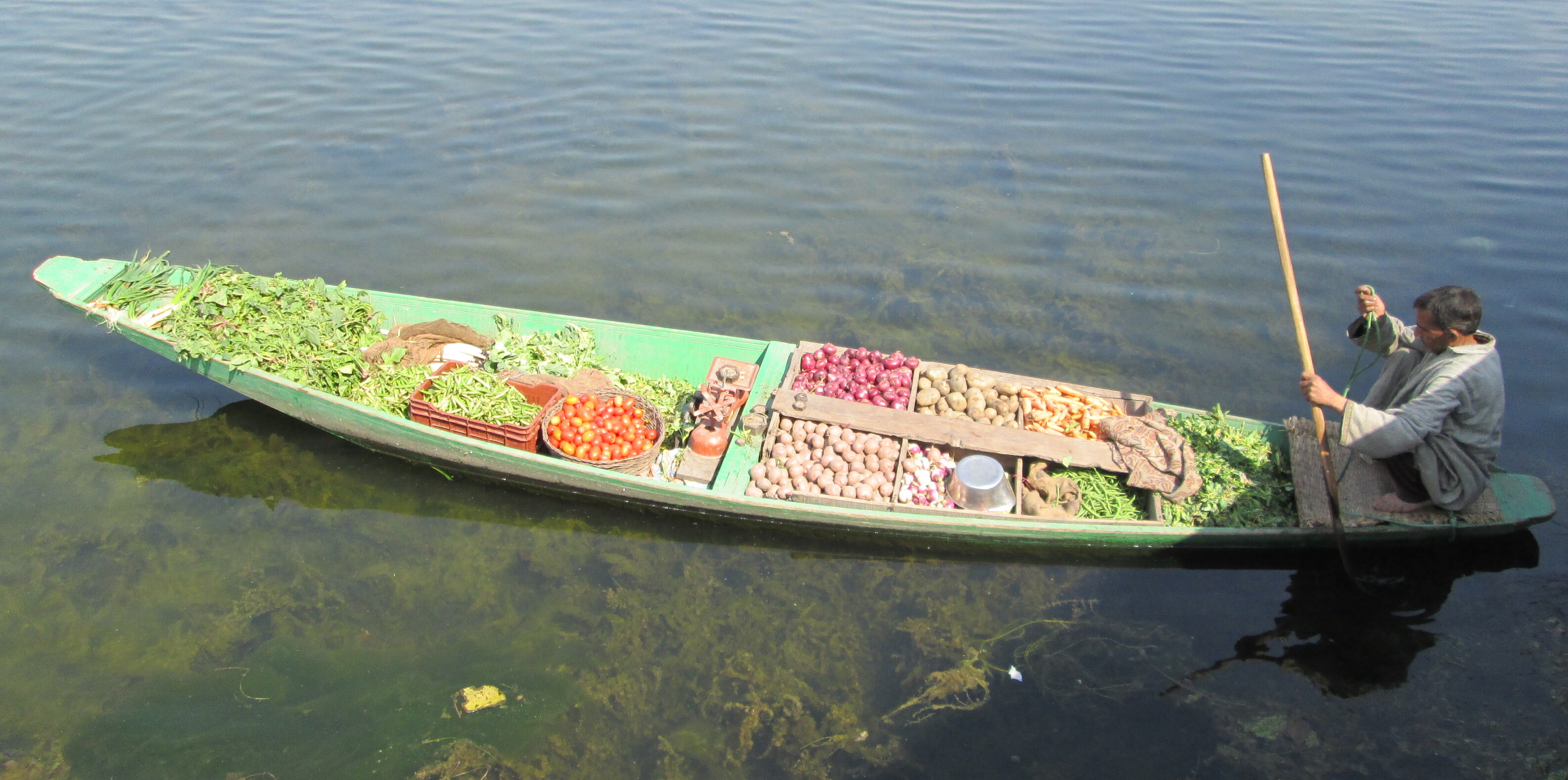
A vegetable seller on Dal Lake

The most frequently used Kashmiri vegetables are: haakh (collard greens or kale), monj Haak ( kohlrabi), tsochael(mallow), bamchoont (quince), kral mound (shepherds purse), saze posh (holly hock), nadur (lotus stem), praan (shallots), aubuj (sorrel), mawal (cockscomb), wushkofur (camphor), tila gogul (mustard) and gor (water-chestnut). The floating vegetable garden on the Dal Lake is the second largest wholesale market in the world. Men, young and old, on their wooden boats, argue about the price of plump pumpkins and gourds as they share cigarettes or hookahs.

Sun-dried vegetables, locally known as hokh syun, are consumed as fresh produce dwindles. During summer, vegetables are peeled, chopped, salted and sun-dried to preserve them for winter. The various varieties of hokh syun include dried tomatoes (ruwangun haech), dried fenugreek leaves (meeth), dried lotus stem (nadir haech), dried Iberian knapweed (kretch), dried shallot leaves (praan), dried mint (pudna), dried bottle gourd (al haech), dried turnip slices (gogji haech), dried quince (bamchount haech), dried collard greens (hoech haak) and dried spinach (hoech palak). In the Charar Sharief area of central Kashmir, dried pears, locally known as tang haech are considered a delicacy.

Shallots, known as praan, stand out, lending its unique flavour to a multitude of Kashmiri dishes, from soups and stews, to curries and kebabs. Many of Mughal Emperor Akbar's feasts in the 16th century featured shallots. Buthoo village has earned renown for producing prized organic shallots. Snow Mountain garlic, also known as Kashmiri garlic, is a rare single-clove variety of Allium sativum. The clove beneath is bright white to creamy-white color and offers a strong, pungent garlic flavour without the acidity present in other varieties.

Kashmir valley is the only place in India where asparagus grows. Until the 1960s, it was grown widely in Kashmir at Pulwama, Budgam, Rajbagh, Tangmarg and Gulmarg. As of now the area of asparagus cultivation is restricted to Tangmarg and Gulmarg.

=== Sugar and sweeteners ===
Sugarcane does not grow in Kashmir. Sugar was exclusively imported from erstwhile united Punjab up to 1947 but was among the costliest imports to Kashmir. The then Dogra government suggested cultivating sugar maple and beetroot sugar but it could not materialise. In the past, when sugar was not imported, people used honey. Sidr honey considered one of the most distinguished types of honey in the world, is obtained from Sidr (jujube) trees in the Kashmir Valley.

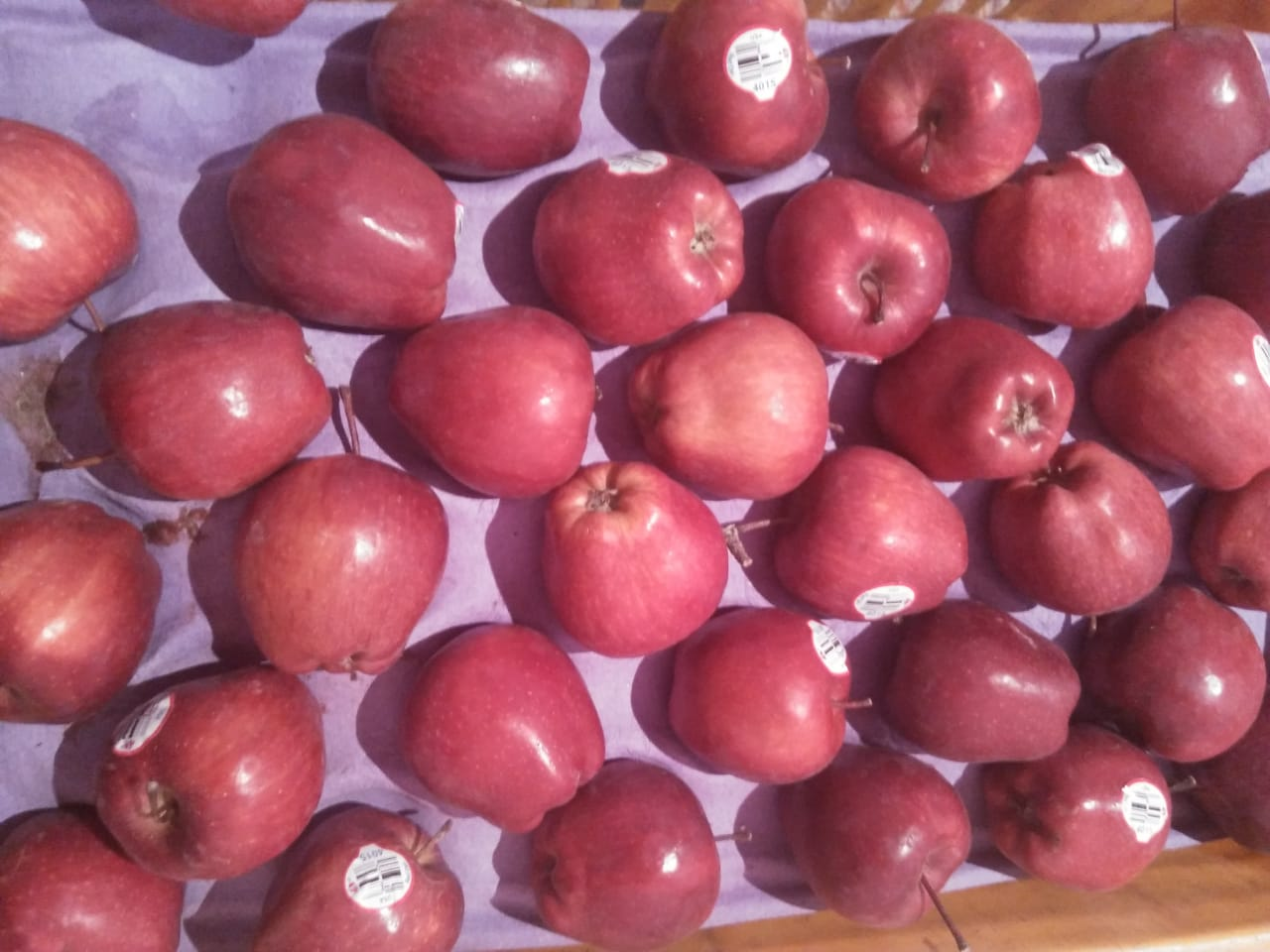
Kashmiri apples

=== Fruits ===
Kashmiri apples are known for their juiciness and flavour. In 2019 alone, Kashmir produced over 1.9 million metric tonnes of apples, the highest among Indian states. Further, Kashmir accounts for 90% of India's walnut production. Kashmiri walnuts are a great source of nutrients and widely in demand across the globe. Giant walnut trees can scale 75 feet in Srinagar, the capital of Kashmir. Many years ago, walnut oil used to be a medium of cooking and imparted a sweeter and nuttier flavour to dishes.

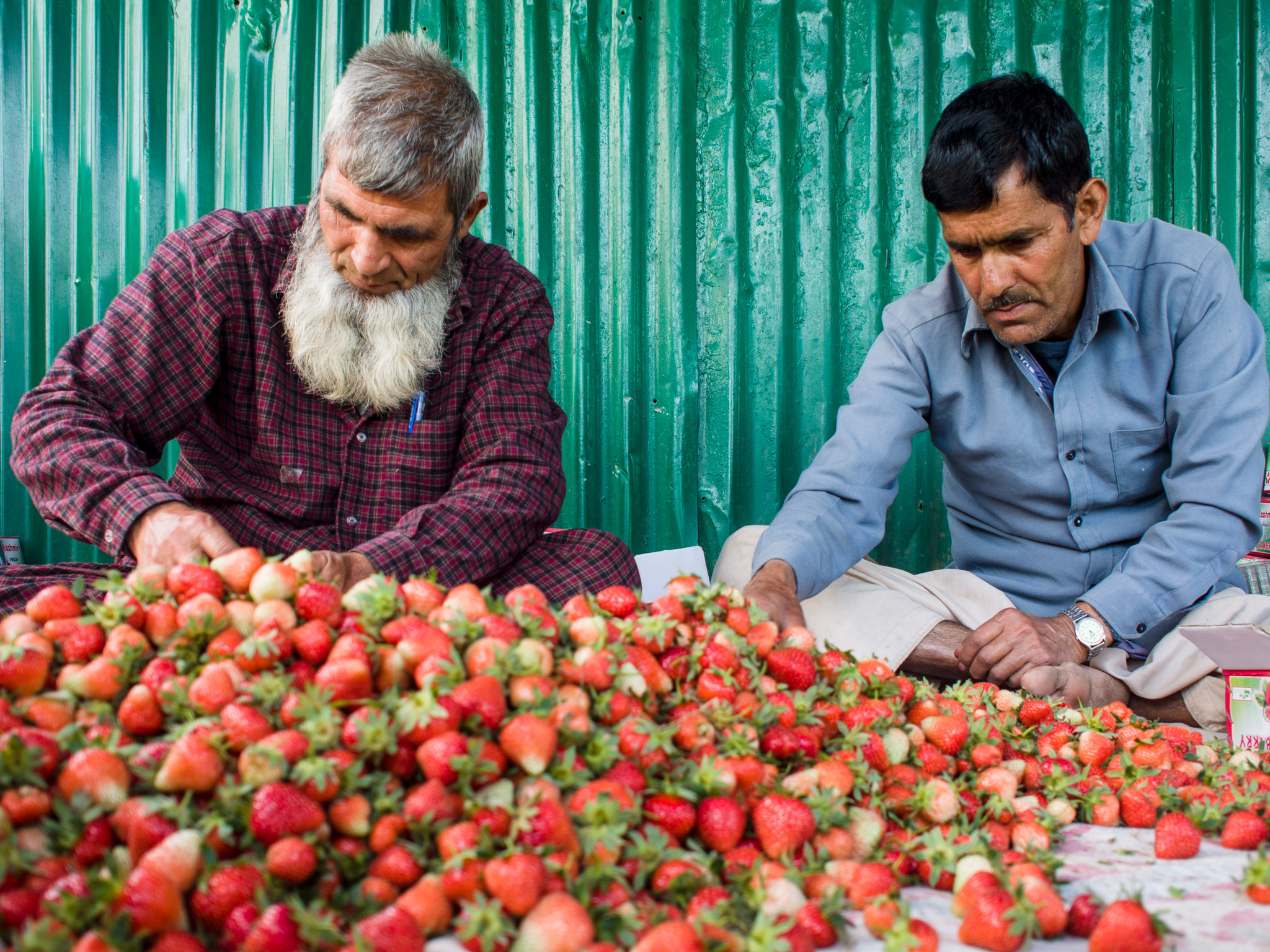
The local climate with bright sunshine and moderate rainfall, is ideally suited for strawberry cultivation.

Muhammad Quli Afshar brought cherries from Kabul and planted them during Akbar's reign. Mishri variety of cherry is famous in Kashmir and sweeter than other varieties. They are loaded with minerals, vitamins and plant compounds. The exotic berries from Kashmir are sweet and sour mulberry (tuell and shah-tuell), raspberry (chhanchh), barberry (kaawducchh) and red berry (haapat maewaa). Gassu area on the Srinagar outskirts is known for strawberry (istaber) harvesting.

Orange cultivation for commercial purposes was introduced a few decades before in the Urossa village in Uri. The climate and soil is relatively warmer than the rest of Kashmir and conducive for the crop. In this mountainous region, the micro-climate is good for Mediterranean crops like lemons and olives. The lemons are better and juicier than Punjab lemons. A sub-species of wild olives that doesn't bear much fruit but grows even in hardy, rough conditions is used for grafting with fruit varieties, producing about 1,000 litres of extra virgin olive oil each year.

Kashmiri grapes are cultivated on almost 500 to 600 hectares of land with production up to 1100 to 1500 MT per year.

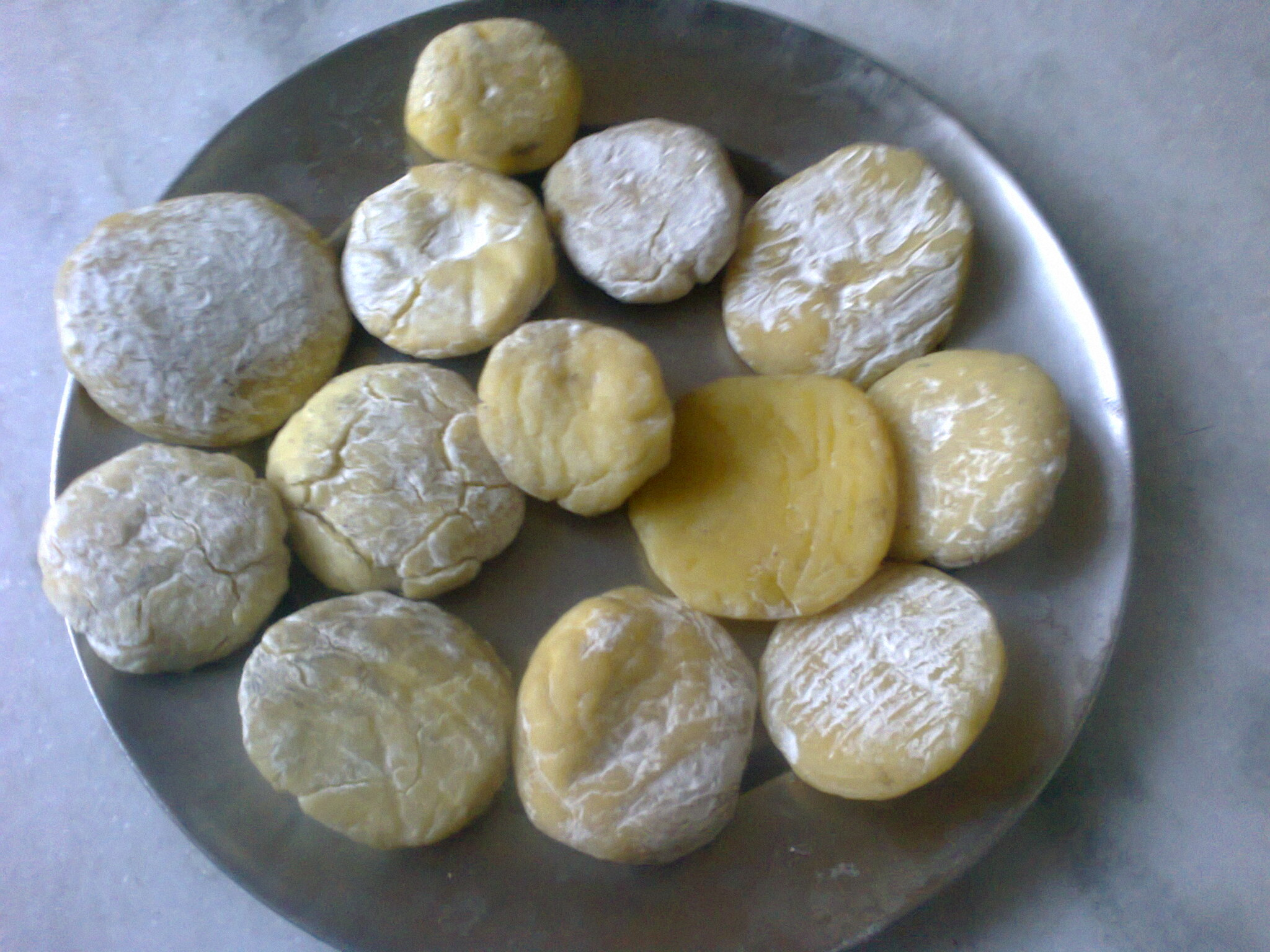
Dried cheese (maish krej)

=== Dairy products ===
Holstein Friesian and Jersey cows were introduced in Kashmir several decades ago, producing 4 million litres of milk per day. Organic Kashmiri butter wrapped in Chinar leaves was common in the yesteryears, but is now sold only by a few. A traditionally ripened Himalayan cheese is called the milk chapati or maish krej in Kashmiri.

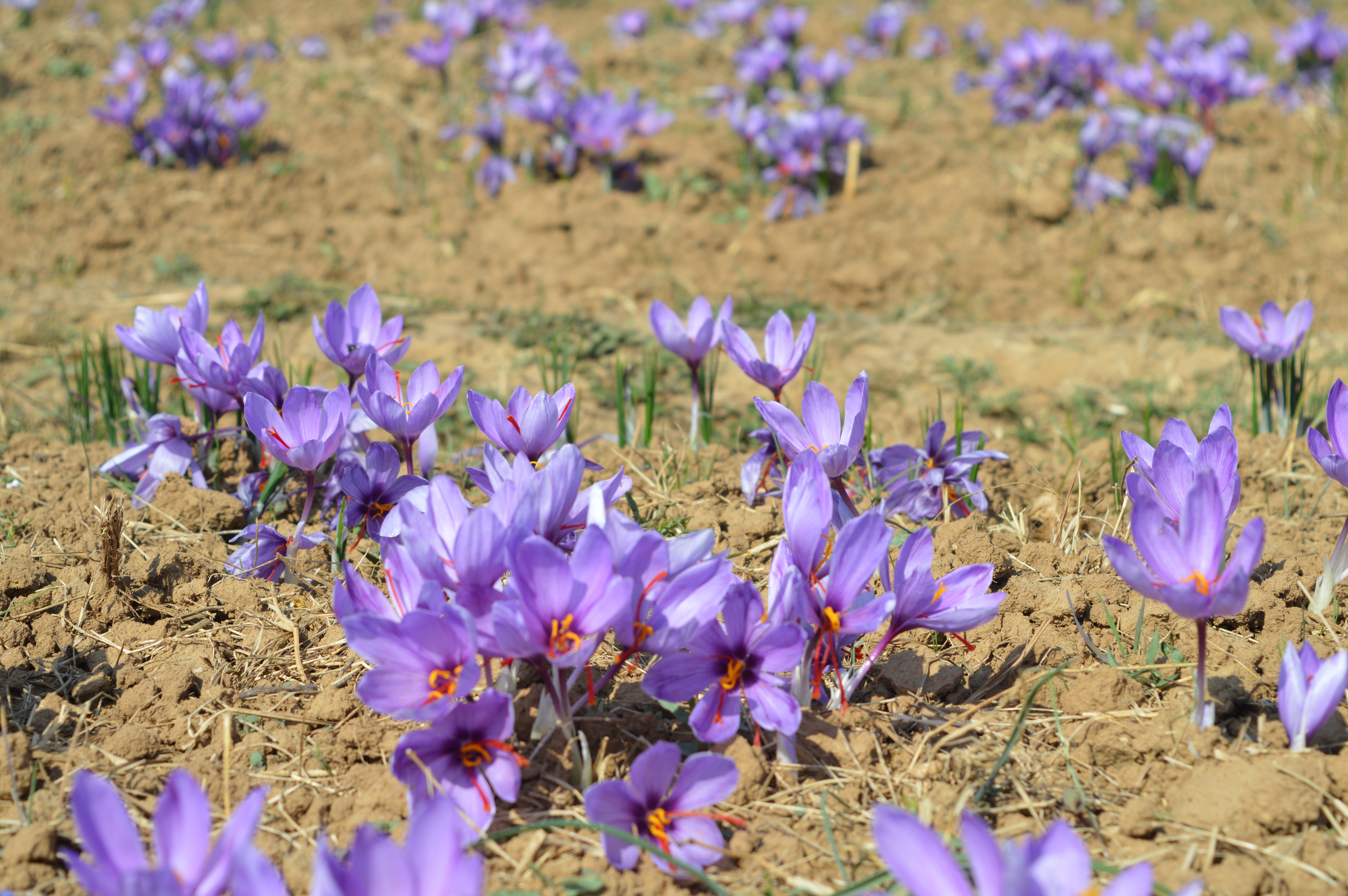
Saffron fields in Pampore

=== Spices ===
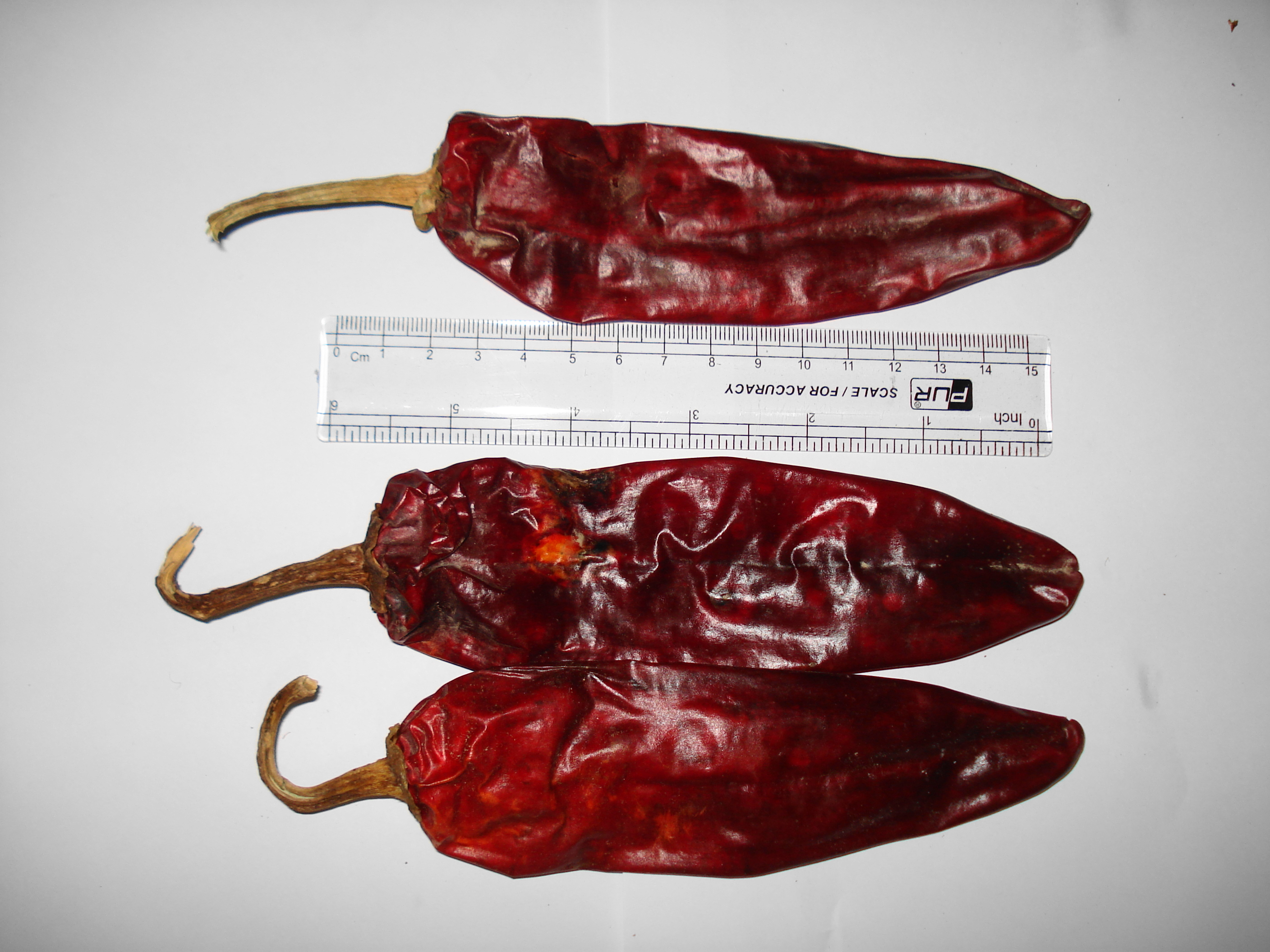
Kashmiri Chilli Pepper

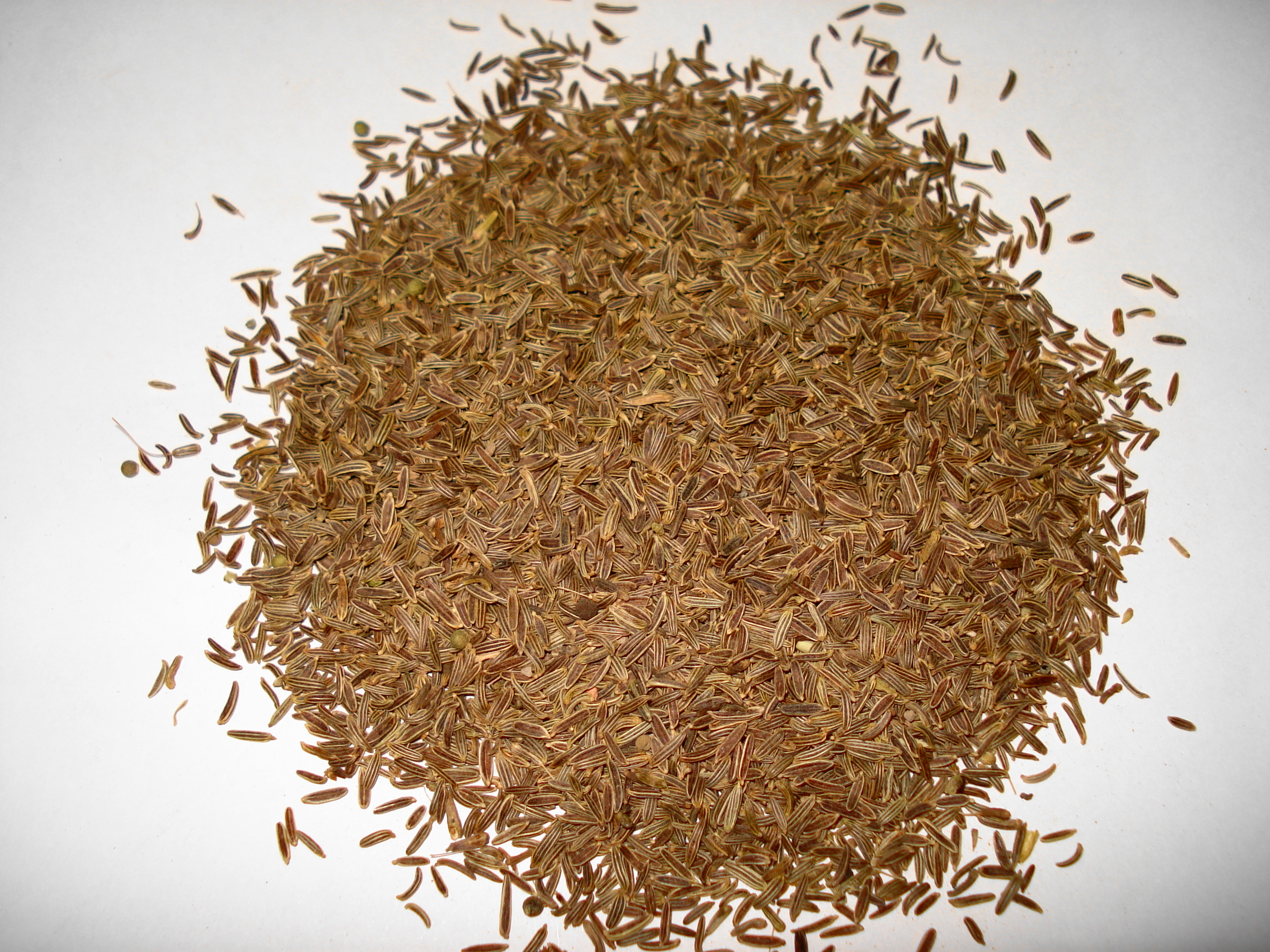
Kashmiri black cumin

Kashmiri saffron is known for its aroma, colour, and medicinal value. The saffron of Pampore town is considered to be of superior quality with 8.72% crocin content as compared to the Iranian variety which contains 6.82%. In May 2020, Kashmiri saffron was given a geographical indication tag. The spice shahi zeera or imperial cumin or black cumin belongs to Apiaceae (parsley) family and was initially available in the jungles of Gurez Valley. These darker seeds unlike the regular brown zeera are of superior quality because of their smell, relative rarity and shape.

Among the spices used, Kashmiri chilli pepper (martswangun) — chilies are grown locally in Kashmir. When they turn red, they are dried and ground into powder form. Powdered red chilies are moderately hot colouring agents that are used for most meat and some vegetarian dishes. The taste varies with the region they are being cultivated, from areas such as Bugam, Tangmarg, Bandipora, Dangerpora, Anantnag and Noorbagh. Chillies of Bugam are the most bitter in taste, while Noorbagh chillies have less seeds and are spicier than the ones grown in other areas. The local government has sought a geographical indication tag for chillies cultivated in Srinagar and Budgam districts.

Rock salt consumption is quite old in Kashmir. It is imported from Khewrah area of Pakistani Punjab, where it was first discovered by the troops of Alexander the Great in 326 B.C. Pre-independence, rock salt was imported via Mughal Road, which, before the advent of Mughals, was called Namak Route. After partition, its supply was barred. Because of its benefits, it is now being consumed by almost one-fourth of the population.

== Specialties by season ==
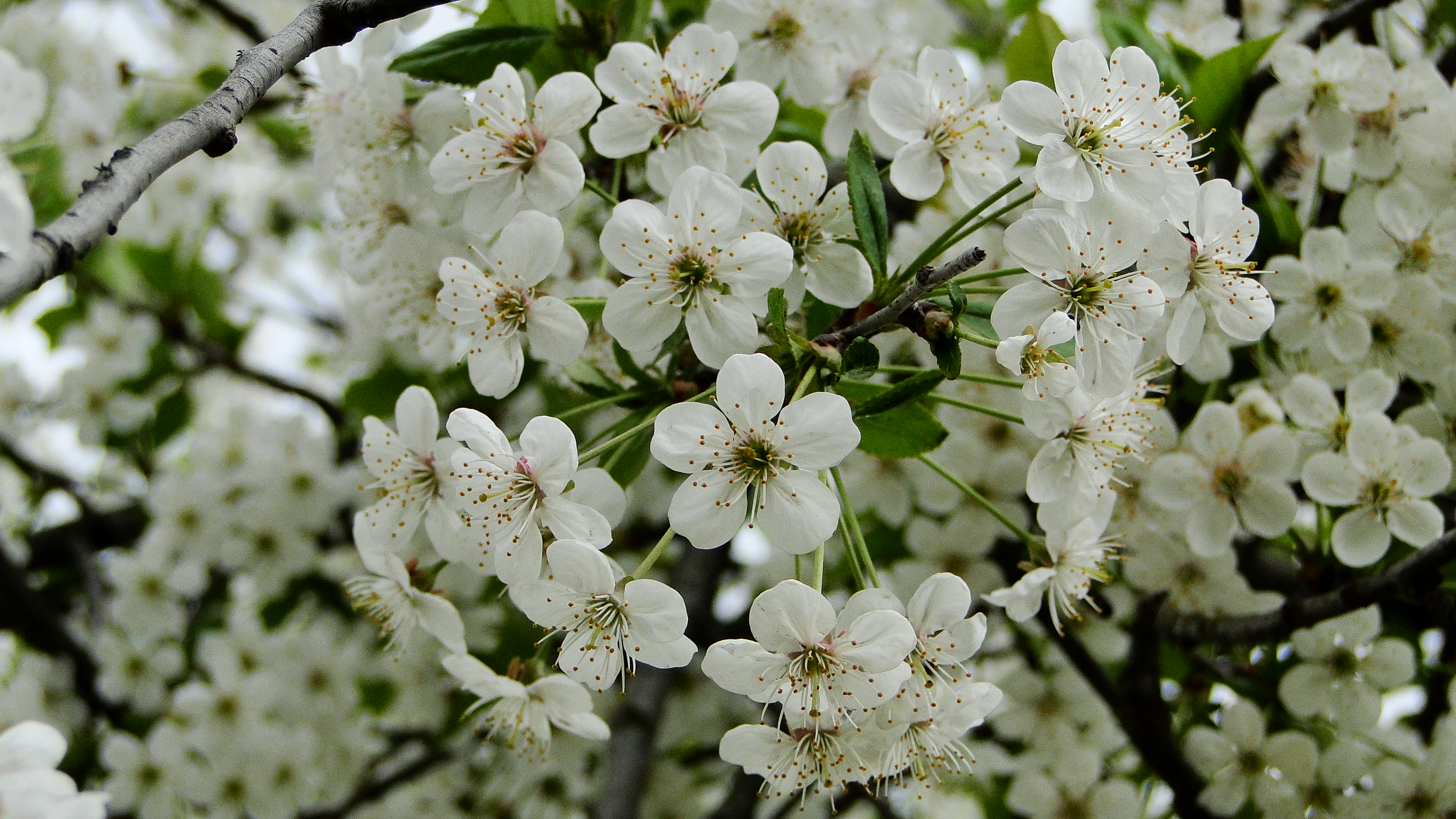
A fruit tree in spring

Spring is often considered a season of rejuvenation after a long and harsh winter. Picnics, of which the Kashmiris are very fond, are planned around the theme of food. The countryside is awash with white and pink flowers of almond (badaam), peach (tsunun) and cherry (gilaas) blossoms. The mustard fields join the show with their bright-yellow blooms. The pear (tang) blossoms can be identified by their thick cluster of flowers. Apricot (Tser) blossoms are white in colour, often tinged with a pink or reddish hue. They grow from late spring through early summer. Beans are a spring vegetable. Cherries are a fruit of late spring and summer. Coriander (danival) is a cool herb whose season predominates between spring and summer in cooler areas. Garlic (rohan) is found mainly in spring and through fall season. Melons (kharbooz) are a fruit grown in spring and summer. Tender spring-time haakh (collard greens) are called kaanul.

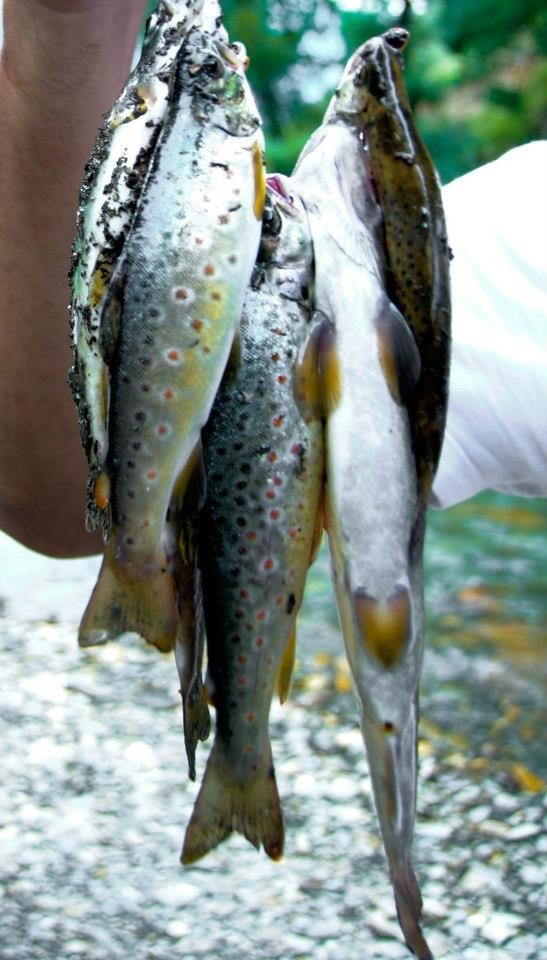
Trout fishing, such as here in the river Taobat, is open during the summer months.

The season of harvesting lotus stem (nadur) starts in September. The samovar bubbles in a corner, spreading the sweet fragrance of saffron and cardamom in the air. Cookie-shaped kandi kulchas made of flour, butter, sugar and sprinkled with poppy seeds are passed around to be dipped into the tea and relished. Men fish under the shade of the chinar tree in Dalgate area. Dandelion leaves, also known as haand in Kashmir, are foraged on foot. Going to the countryside, one can see paddy being cut with sickles and then stacked in huge piles to dry. Chestnuts are roasted in the dying embers. Bulbous garlic and red potatoes jostle for space. Saffron fields in full bloom greet you in Pampore, a part of Pulwama district. Going towards the hilly areas one can see the maize and walnut trees with their fruit getting ready to be harvested. Going towards the apple producing areas of Sopore in North Kashmir or Shopian in South Kashmir, one can see cartons of apple being transported to various parts of the country.

During the long winters the days are short, sunlight and electricity in short supply, so there is not much that can liven up existence except interesting food, so it constitutes a major interest of the Kashmiris' lives. On window sills and terraces, one can spot small piles of aubergines, cherry tomatoes, gourds and turnips being sun-dried. There is ample time and the daan (Kashmiri traditional stove) with its twin stoves (Chaer in Kashmiri) ignited by fire wood placed in one inlet) is always ready to oblige long hours of cooking despite the shortages of electricity. When all village roads remained blocked due to heavy snowfall and villagers have to use oil lamps or kerosene lanterns, the entire family is called to the kitchen where flavour of the overnight shab deg fills the entire space. Kohlrabi (monje) is cold tolerant, and continues to grow on the fields in winter, so much that a little frost even helps it.

== Beverages ==
=== Noon Chai or Sheer Chai ===
Kashmiris are heavy tea drinkers. Kashmiris don't use the word "Kashmiri Chai". The word "Noon" in Kashmiri means salt. The most popular drink is a pinkish coloured salted tea called "noon chai". It is made with black tea, milk, salt and bicarbonate of soda. The particular colour of the tea is a result of its unique method of preparation and the addition of soda. The Kashmiri Hindus more commonly refer to this chai as "Sheer Chai." The Kashmiri Muslims refer to it as "Noon Chai" or "Namkeen Chai", both meaning salty tea. Noon Chai or Sheer Chai is a common breakfast tea in Kashmiri households and is taken with breads like baqerkhani brought fresh from Qandur (Kashmiri : کاندر ) or bakers. It is one of the most basic and essential food items in a Kashmiri household. Tea was as served in large samavars. Now, the use of Samavars is limited to special occasions and normally kettles are used. Nuts like almonds and pistachios and edible rose petals can be added before serving, and sometimes malai or fresh cream is added to give the tea viscosity and richness.

=== Other drinks ===
Babribyol sharbat is a concoction of sweetened milk, rose water or Rooh Afza syrup, and soaked sweet basil seeds that are grown locally.

Made from yoghurt or kefir, Kashmiri lassi (lyaess) is a liquid, salty way to drink up yoghurt. The process of churning the buttermilk with a wooden choomph or churner is rhythmic and there is an art involved. The yoghurt has to be churned the right way, the buttery fats have to float to the top in a nice froth, the spices and dried mint leaves have to be just right.

Sadr-e-kaenz is a fermented rice water drink is supposed to be very good for a sluggish liver.

Shahi Sheera is made by extracting the juice of different berries, it is prepared at home during Ramadan. It features in 1977 Kashmiri film Arnimaal where guests are sipping on the beverage during wedding festivities.

== Festival foods ==
=== Eid-ul-Fitr ===
During Ramadan, Muslims avoid consuming food during the day. The menu for Ramadan month includes khajur ka laddoo (date balls), babribyol (basil seeds), kulfi, phirin, seemni, fruit chaat, fruit custard, kateer (a drink loaded with health benefits) and noon chai. The smell of slow-cooked mutton hovers, fragrant and sultry in the air, and despite the familiar air of unpredictability in Srinagar, spirits are high and streets are filled with happy greetings of Eid Mubarak.

=== Eid-ul-Adha ===
The day begins with the Fajr (dawn) prayer and a breakfast of bakery goods with dodh kehwa (milky green tea). As the festival draws to a close, most well-to-do families start placing orders with the wazas for the feast, which is cooked by chefs at their own places and then sold to the customers for serving at their homes. Sacrificial animals include Delhi Walla, Merino Cross, Bakerwal and Kashmiri varieties of sheep.

=== Other festivals ===
For the Urs of Hazrat Sheikh Dawood, only vegetarian food is supplied to devotees. Majority of people in Batmaloo and adjoining areas turn vegetarian and do not eat meat or chicken. They widely consume dried turnips (gogji aare) because it is believed, during Dawood's time, sundried turnips helped Kashmir survive a famine.

For the Urs of Raeshmol Saheb, people in Anantnag district in southern Kashmir quit eating meat as a mark of respect for the 16th century mystic. Rarely is a butcher shop open during these seven days. For three-and-a-half days each before and after the saint's Urs, people eat radish braised in tamarind.

The festival of Navreh, the Kashmiri New Year, is incomplete without nadur.

== Diaspora and fusion cuisines ==
Tibetan exiles in Kashmir, including members of Tibet's small Muslim population, live in Srinagar, mainly in a small area near the 18th-century Hari Parbat fort. Popular momo (beef dumplings) shops and Tibetan restaurants are run by their children. Tibetan options include Cantonese chicken and kumloo wonton, fried pasta stuffed with minced mushrooms.

Kashmiri Sikh cuisine has a bit of influence from Punjab with onions and tomatoes, but the flavouring goes the Kashmiri way with elements such as badyaan (saunf). A large number of Indian tourists depend entirely on Vaishno Dhabas, the Valley's generic non-A/C restaurants that serve all-vegetarian North Indian fare.

== Cooking methods ==
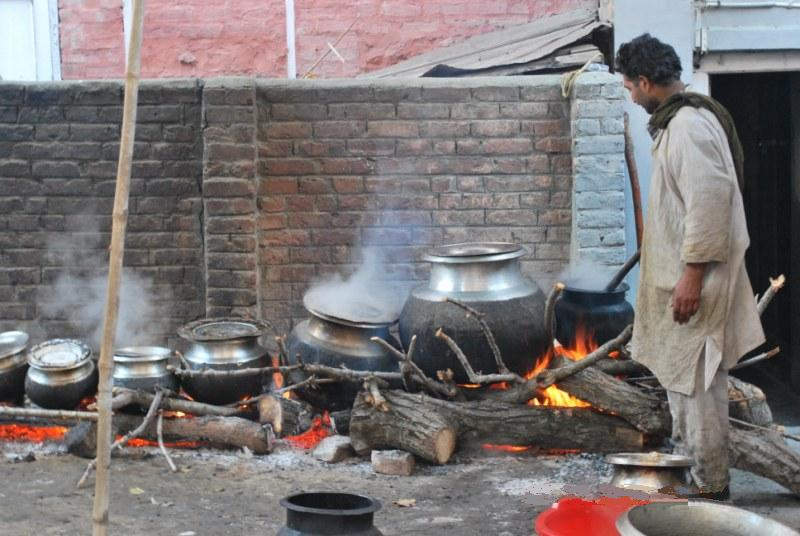
The master chefs, the waaze of Kashmir.

Some Kashmiri cooking techniques are:

Traditional Kashmir food receives heat on two sides, top and bottom and the best results are obtained by slow heat using charcoal.

The leaves of Kashmiri haakh are braised in lots of water. It is very important to ensure that the haakh stays submerged underwater during the initial cooking process using a wooden spatula or large spoon to continuously push the greens down. Mustard oil, which is used extensively in Kashmiri cuisine, imparts an extra flavour to the dish.

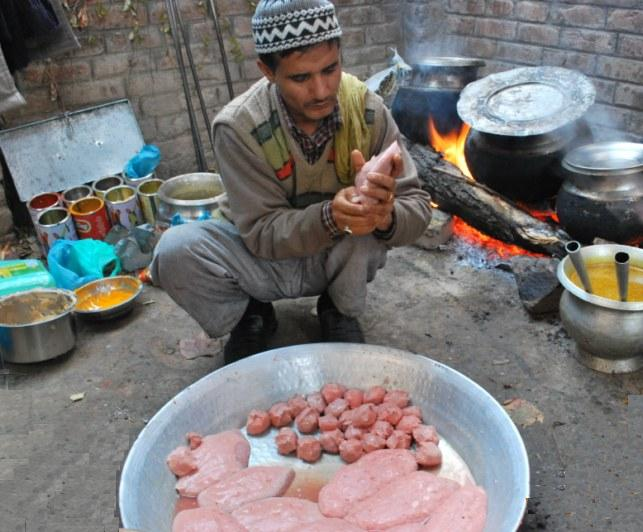
Tenderising and preparing riste, one of the most important dishes in a Kashmiri feast.

Much of Kashmiri cooking relies on a fragrant meat stock or court-bouillon. The main skill of a wazwan lies in the preparation of this stock made of onions and shallots. Freshly shaped meatballs (rista and goshtabeh) are poached in this lamb stock flavoured with cinnamon and black cardamom, and simmered.

Whole spices must be tempered, fried in oil – clove, cardamom, cinnamon, bay leaves. Fried too little, and the dish will be lifeless, without fragrance. A second too much, and one will be left with nothing but bitterness. Hot ghee or mustard oil is poured on top and garnished with fried praan (shallots) paste & saffron extract.

Sliced onions are caramelised, fried until golden brown and pureed with minimal water.

Yoghurt must be a fatty, thick emulsion. Dried mint, just a pinch, is added right at the end to freshen the dish.

Some dishes are enhanced in colour by saffron extract (rogan josh and rista), or mawal (dried cockscomb flower). Kashmiri chilli is also added in excess sometimes to produce a red colour. Tomato is incorrectly used as a substitute when mawal and rattanjot are not available. No authentic version cooked in Kashmir has tomatoes.

The food gets its flavours and textures from the spices being simmered, slow cooked with ingredients until they let out their inherent juices and fats and melt together.

Smoking mustard oil is a treatment known as durust, and gets it ready to use after cooling off.

In dum pukht cooking, the cooking vessel in the shab deg is sealed with dough before being cooked over a simmering fire through the long winter night. Dum cooking was made popular by the Mughal courts around the 16th century.

Goshtabeh and rista, the two meatball dishes, are rarely found outside the valley because their unique tenderised texture is enormously challenging. The sheep has to be freshly slaughtered and the meat pounded before rigor mortis sets. To incorporate air to make them light and fluffy, the meat undergoes a process of being folded while beaten.

The stalks of dandelion (haand) with their spiky-edged leaves have to blanched four times so that they bear no bitterness.

The quality of pots is important, according to wosta (ustad) or chef Nazir Ahmed Aram. He says they must have the right content of copper. Using wood (walnut and apple are the best) is important too. Cooking on gas is not the same.

== See also ==
- Kanger
- List of topics on the land and the people of Jammu and Kashmir
- Dogra cuisine, from the Jammu region of Kashmir
- Balti (food), associated with the Baltistan region of Kashmir
- Kashmiri food proverbs
