= Kashmiri food proverbs =

The Kashmiri language is rich in food-related proverbs and idioms.

Kashmiri food-related idioms include:

- Adyav kheyiv chinih adyav kheyiv taki — half the people ate from large dishes, and half from small dishes. A badly arranged dinner.
- Akh chhiwyov masah byak hakah rasah — one man is intoxicated with the juice of the grape, another with juice of vegetables. Pride dwells in everyone, whether he be rich or poor.
- Akh duda biyi maji kyut toak — an uninvited guest wants a (toak) plateful for his mother, in addition to himself. Toak was an earthen plate, in general use in Kashmir in the past. Beggars and some uninvited people pushed themselves in among the guests because of their poverty, or their desire for tasting the delicacies. It is applied where a person is not content with what is willingly offered to him, and demands more.
- Apih hund gyav — a foolish woman's ghee. A foppish person. Kashmiri people, both wealthy and others, rubbed their hair with fresh ghee.
- Batah gajih ruhun — as garlic upon the hearth of a Pandit, so your presence is to me. The ancestors of the Hindus would not eat garlic because of their aphrodisiac effects, having devoted themselves to religion.
- Batook Poth — to have eaten batook poth (duck's backside) is an expression in Kashmiri for someone who talks a lot.
- Chaanis haakhas chha paakuk haajat — does your haakh require hard cooking? A sort of ironic flattery with the sense that your haakh is so delicate, it takes hardly any time to cook.
- Chaantis animu mathun — to grease one's mouth with gruel.
- Chayi tani ya gani magar tech gachi cheyn — tea, whether weak or strong, should be taken hot.
- Dali Baate ti Khoji thool — dal for a Pandit and an egg for a Khoja, the kind of food they like.
- Doori doori marts meethan, nishi nishi naabad tyathaan — pepper tastes sweet from afar, sugar tastes bitter when too near.
- Hardas gurus metras, sontah gurus shetras — autumn butter-milk for the friend, and spring butter-milk for the enemy. Consequently, the milk is better in the autumn.
- Hari tang tah zulahnai, muhuri tsont tah zulit — if the pear cost only a cowrie it should not be peeled, but if the apple cost a sovereign it should be peeled. Natives of Kashmir seldom skin a pear, but always skin an apple.
- Haruch gugaj tah Laruch gunas chhih barabar — a June turnip and a Lar serpent are equal. A native would not eat June turnip on any account, while Gunas is a round-headed serpent met with principally in Lar parganah, whose bite is generally fatal.
- Majji bhatee — food served by mother is the best food.
- Phata Wangun — a burst eggplant, literally, a sly young man often too clever for his own good.
- Rogan o zafaran az Pampur, sag az Latapur brinj az Nupur; barrah az Nandapur. Puttu o mahi az Sopur; mong az Kralapur. Arad az Khampur. Shir az Shadipur. Angur az Repur — Pampore (the place) for ghee and saffron, Letapur for vegetables. Nipur for rice. Nandapur for lamb. Sopore for pattu and fish. Kralapur for dal. Khampur for flour. Shadipur for milk. And grapes from Repur.
- Talwe peyi na tangah — wishing a pear falls from ceiling is a vain hope.
- Chaki pechni ras, yath poshi tas — When someone keeps bragging about this which they usually don't have..
- Khar kya zani zaffran kya gow — a donkey won't understand the taste of saffron.
- badhshah saab khar ne khewan zab, yeli poras teli kheyi zab — usually said for unthankful people who don't accept food.
