= Kasmir (disambiguation) =

Kasmir or Kashmir is the northernmost geographical region of the Indian subcontinent.

Kasmir may also refer to:

- Kasmir (singer) (born 1985), Finnish urban soul music artist
- Jan Rose Kasmir (born 1950), former American high-school student featured in an anti-war photograph
- Kašmir, a poetry collection by Aleš Šteger

== See also ==
- Kashmir (disambiguation)
- Kaśmir Śaivism or Kashmir Shaivism, a school of Śaivism consisting of Trika and its philosophical articulation Pratyabhijña
