= Hamidi Kashmiri =

- Born: 1932; Srinagar, Kashmir and Jammu, British India
- Died: December 27, 2018 (aged 85–86); Srinagar, Jammu and Kashmir, India
- Occupations: Writer and educationist
- Spouse: Maryam Hamidi
- Children: Masood Aalam, Saba Hamidi
- Awards: Padma Shri; Ghalib Award; Sahitya Akademi Award

Hamidi Kashmiri was a Kashmiri poet in Kashmiri and Urdu language and a former Vice Chancellor of the University of Kashmir. Hamidi Kashmiri is credited with 50 books, Iqtishafi Tanqeed Ki Sheryat, Ainame Ibraaq, Mahasir Tanqeed, Riyasati Jammu Aur Kashmir Urdu Adab, Jadeed Kashir Shayeri and Shiekh–ul-Aalam Aur Shayeri being some of the notable ones.

Kashmiri is a recipient of the Ghalib Award and Sahitya Akademi Award (2005). In 2010, the Government of India honored him with the Padma Shri, the country's fourth highest civilian award.
