= Cashmere (Cashmere album) =

Studio album by Cashmere
- Released: 1985
- Genre: Dance-pop boogie
- Label: Philly World (U.S. 90243-1); 4th & Broadway (UK BRLP 503)
- Producer: Donald R. Robinson, Michael Forte. Bunny Sigler, Bobby Eli, Ron Dean Miller

Cashmere chronology
Let The Music Turn You On (1983)	Cashmere (1985)

Cashmere is the second album of the band with the same name, released in 1985 by Philly World Records (and distributed by Atlantic Records). This album also includes their previous 1984 hit "Can I?".

== Reception ==
- Craig Lytle of AllMusic states that: "with the rapid advancement of studio gimmickry and keyboard technology, Cashmere sacrifices the authenticity of real instruments. However, they remain true to the vocality of their music."

== Track listing ==
Side A

1. "Can I" (D. Robinson/M. Horton/M. Forte) – 6:27
2. "Someone Like You" (L. Barry/M. Horton) – 6:04
3. "Fascination" (L. Barry/M. Horton/M. Forte) - 5:10
4. "You're All I Need" (D. Dukes) – 4:18

Side B

1. "We Need Love" (M. Horton/M. Forte) – 4:45
2. "Keep Me Up " (D. Burgee/D. Robinson/D. Dukes) – 5:47
3. "Cutie Pie" (L. Barry/M. Horton/R. Broomfield) – 4:18
4. "Don't Keep Me Waiting" (D. Burgee/D. Dukes/M. Horton/M. Horton) – 4:19

== Personnel ==
"Can I"

- Bruce Weeden – mixing, soloist, electric guitar
- Donald R. Robinson – rhythm arrangement
- Dennis Richardson, Eugene Curry - synthesizer
- Producer, rhythm arrangement – Bobby Eli

"Someone Like You"

- Donald R. Robinson – rhythm arrangement
- Bruce Weeden – mixing
- Dennis Richardson, Eugene Curry - synthesizer
- Producer, rhythm arrangement – Bobby Eli

"Fascination" (Vocal)

- Ron Dean Miller – producer, rhythm arrangement, backing vocals
- Donald R. Robinson – rhythm arrangement
- Khris Kellow – synthesizer
- Bruce Weeden – mixing

"Spasticus Autisticus" (Version)

- Doug Grisby – bass guitar
- Jack Faith – strings arrangement
- Don Renaldo – strings
- Donald R. Robinson, Michael Forte – rhythm arrangement, producer

"We Need Love"

- Don Renaldo – strings
- Norman Harris – strings arrangement
- Khris Kellow – synthesizer
- Ron Dean Miller – producer, rhythm arrangement, backing vocals

"Keep Me Up"

- Willie Williams – soloist, saxophone

Donald R. Robinson, Michael Forte – producer

"Cutie Pie"

- Bunny Sigler – rhythm arrangement, producer

"Don't Keep Me Waiting"

- Donald R. Robinson – rhythm arrangement
- Daryl Burgee – percussion
- Michael Forte – producer

== Chart performance ==
Chart (1985)	Peak position
US Top R&B Albums	49
UK Albums Chart	63
