= Snow Mountain garlic =

Himalayan mountain garlic

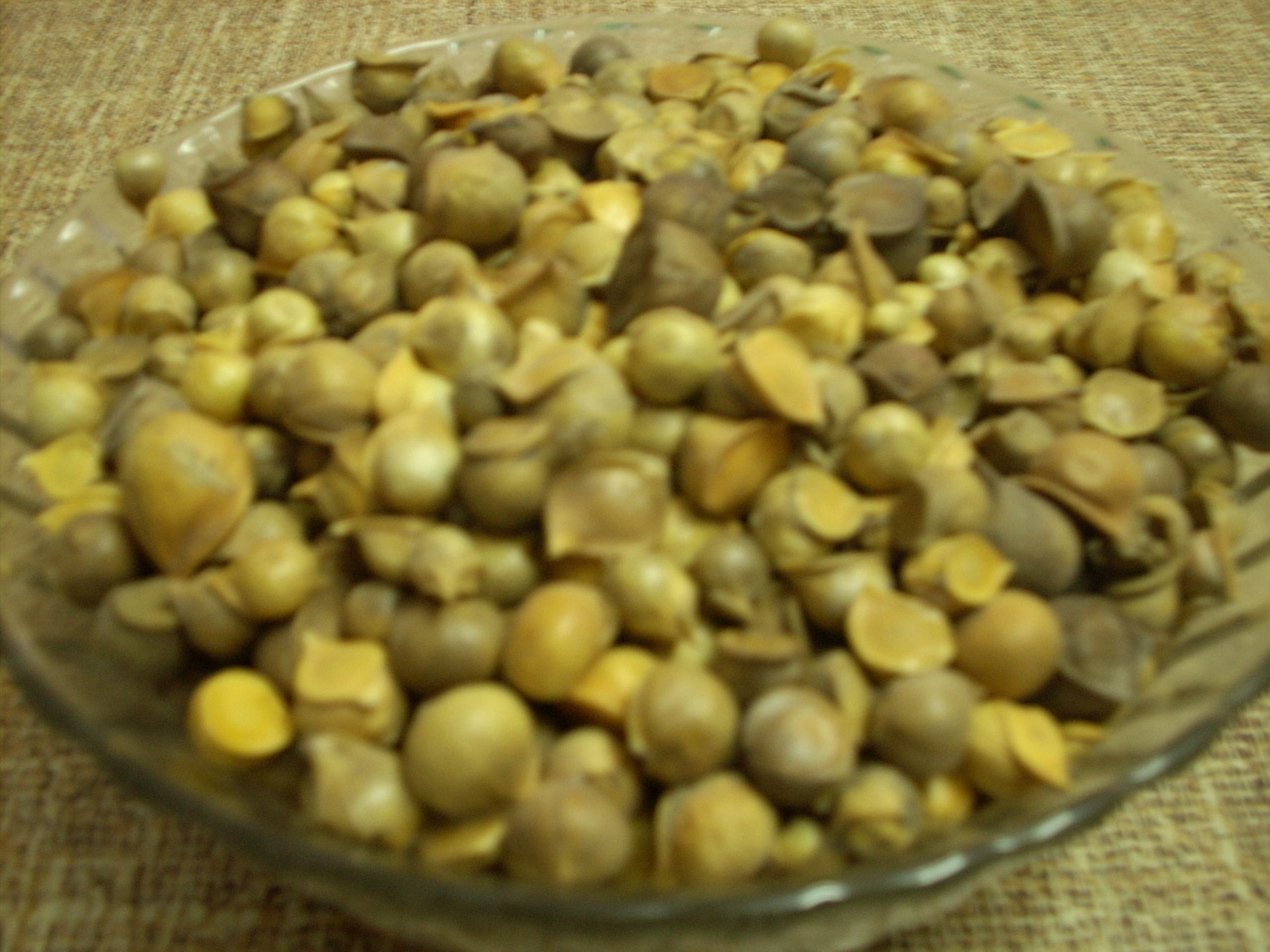
- Snow Mountain garlic
- Species: Allium sativum
- Origin: Indian

Snow Mountain garlic (also known as Allium sativum, Allium schoenoprasum, and Kashmiri garlic), is a type of garlic found in mountainous Jammu and Kashmir. It grows well in the western Himalayas at altitudes of up to 1,800 m (6,000 ft), in temperatures as low as −10 °C (14 °F), and with very little oxygen. In Hindi, it is known as ek pothi lahsun.
