= Cashmere Nicole =

American entrepreneur

- Born: Cashmere Nicole Carillo
- Occupations: Entrepreneur and nurse
- Organization: Beauty Bakerie

Cashmere Nicole known professionally as Cashmere Nicole, is an American entrepreneur and founder of the beauty brand, Beauty Bakerie. She focuses on making a vegan, cruelty-free beauty brand catering to women of color.

== Career ==
In 2011, Nicole officially launched her company Beauty Bakerie. She is also a certified nurse.

== Personal life ==
Nicole was raised in South Bend, Indiana. She became pregnant with her daughter, Taya, at the age of 16, and became a nurse after graduating from college. In 2012, Nicole was diagnosed with breast cancer. As a result, she states that this influenced her decision to focus on creating cruelty-free, nontoxic beauty products. She underwent a double mastectomy in 2014.
