= Kashmir, Iran =

Kashmir كشمير
- Village
- Location within Iran
- Coordinates: 25°41′45″N 58°52′44″E
- Country: Iran
- Province: Hormozgan
- County: Jask
- Bakhsh: Lirdaf
- Rural District: Piveshk

Population (2006)
  - Total: 241
- Time zone: UTC+3:30 (IRST)
  - Summer (DST): UTC+4:30 (IRDT)

Kashmir (Persian: كشمير, also Romanized as Kashmīr) is a village in Piveshk Rural District, Lirdaf District, Jask County, Hormozgan Province, Iran. At the 2006 census, its population was 241, in 62 families.
