= Cashmere (band) =

American musical group

- Origin: Philadelphia, Pennsylvania, U.S.
- Genres: Boogie, dance-pop, soul
- Years active: 1982–1985
- Labels: Philly World Records; 4th & Broadway
- Past members: Dwight Ronnel Dukes; Keith Steward; Daryl Burgee; McKinley Horton

Cashmere was an American music group best known for their boogie and soul hits, including "Can I" and "Do It Anyway You Wanna".

== Career ==
The group formed in 1982 consisting of members Dwight Dukes, keyboardist McKinley Horton, drummer Daryl Burgee, and vocalist Keith Steward. They achieved several hits on the US Billboard R&B and Dance charts between 1983 and 1985. Their debut single "Do It Anyway You Wanna" peaked at No. 21 on the Dance charts and No. 35 on the R&B charts. It also peaked at No. 77 in the UK Singles Chart. A further release "Can I" peaked at No. 29 on the same chart.

In 1985, the group released an eponymous album which included the song "Can I". The album reached No. 49 on the US R&B Albums chart and No. 63 on the UK Albums Chart. Despite the success the group disbanded the same year.

== Discography ==
=== Albums ===
Year	Album	Label	Peak chart positions	
Year	Album	Label	US R&B	UK Albums
1983	Let the Music Turn You On	Philly World	—	—
1985	Cashmere	Philly World	49	63

=== Singles ===
Year	Title	Label	Peak chart positions		
Year	Title	Label	US Dance	US R&B	UK
1983	"Do It Anyway You Wanna"	Philly World	21	35	87
1983	"Try Your Lovin'"	Philly World	―	75	99
1983	"Let the Music Turn You On"	Philly World	—	—	—
1984	"Can I"	Philly World	―	48	29
1984	"Tracks of My Tears"	Fermata	―	—	—
1985	"We Need Love"	Philly World	―	68	52
1985	"Keep Me Up"	Philly World	―	—	—
"—" denotes releases that did not chart
