= Keshmiri =

Keshmiri (Persian: کشمیری) is an Iranian surname. Notable people with this surname include:

- Jalal Keshmiri (1939–1999), Iranian shot putter and discus thrower
- Kamy Keshmiri (born 1969), American discus thrower, son of Jalal
- Masoud Keshmiri, Iranian politician and terrorist
