= Kashmiri proverbs =

Kashmiri proverbs are proverbs in the Kashmiri language, spoken Kashmir. The best available source for the study of these proverbs is a book by Sh. Omkar N. Koul, A Dictionary of Kashmiri Proverbs. It was first published in 1992, then a second edition was published in 2005, and is now available online.

Kashmiri proverbs come in a variety of grammatical forms, such as:

- simple statements: "An apple gets its colour from another apple."
- conjoined phrases: "(She) came to visit the shopkeeper but went to visit a baker instead."
- dialogues: "Mother, no one abuses me." "Son, go and sit on the road."
- wellerism: "The horse has said, “I will help you to go up the steep, but you lead me down the slope."
- rhetorical question: "How will a lamp help a blind person in the dark?"
- sentence fragments: "With short hands and long tongue."

== Examples ==
- Naar Veez Krool Khanun : (Too late to do something)
- Acher Vaalav Seeth Kond Kadun : (Deepest Love)
- Akh te akh gayi kaah : (Unity is strength)
- Ach ongji Thukni : (To strike the eyes with fingers. To tease someone.)

== Relevant publications ==
- Keith, Anand. "Kashmiri Proverbs." Indian Antiquary (1933): 71-76.
- Knowles, James Hinton. A Dictionary of Kashmiri Proverbs & Sayings: Explained and Illustrated from the Rich and Interesting Folklore of the Valley
- Koul, Anand 1933. Kashmiri Proverbs. Indian Antiquary. vol. 1xii, pp. 71-198.
- Nazir, Ghulam Nabi 1988. Kə:šir’ dəpity (Kashmiri sayings). Srinagar: J&K Academy of Art, Culture and Languages.
- Reshi, Lubna. "Study of Kashmiri Folklore in current Scenario." Mass Communicator: International Journal of Communication Studies 11, no. 4 (2017): 33-35. Education Society's Press, 1885.
