= Beauty Bakerie =

US makeup company

- Industry: Cosmetics
- Founded: 2011
- Founder: Cashmere Nicole
- Headquarters: San Diego, California, United States
- Number of employees: 30 (2017)
- Website: beautybakerie.com

Beauty Bakerie is an American beauty company founded by Cashmere Nicole in 2011 and headquartered in San Diego, California.

== History ==
Beauty Bakerie was founded by Cashmere Nicole in 2011. Nicole put herself through college and became a nurse. Her interest in beauty products began when her daughter complained that it was hard for her to find makeup which suited her dark skin tone. Beyoncé boosted the company in 2014 by promoting it during Breast Cancer Awareness Month, after reading Nicole's story of surviving breast cancer on an Indiegogo promotion. The company produces no-smudge lipstick which is vegan and not tested on animals. The name of the company references her love for sweets.

== Expansion ==
Beauty Bakerie launched in the UK in 2017 and by 2019 was selling products in more than 130 countries. The brand is promoted by former US Olympic gymnast Gabby Douglas. It is based in San Diego and employs thirty people. In 2019, Huda Kattan was accused of stealing ideas used by Beauty Bakerie in her makeup range.

Products include eyeshadow palettes, foundations, powders, highlighters, and face oils.
