= List of Kashmiri dishes =

Kashmiri cuisine consists of a wide variety of dishes, listed below.

== Barbecue ==
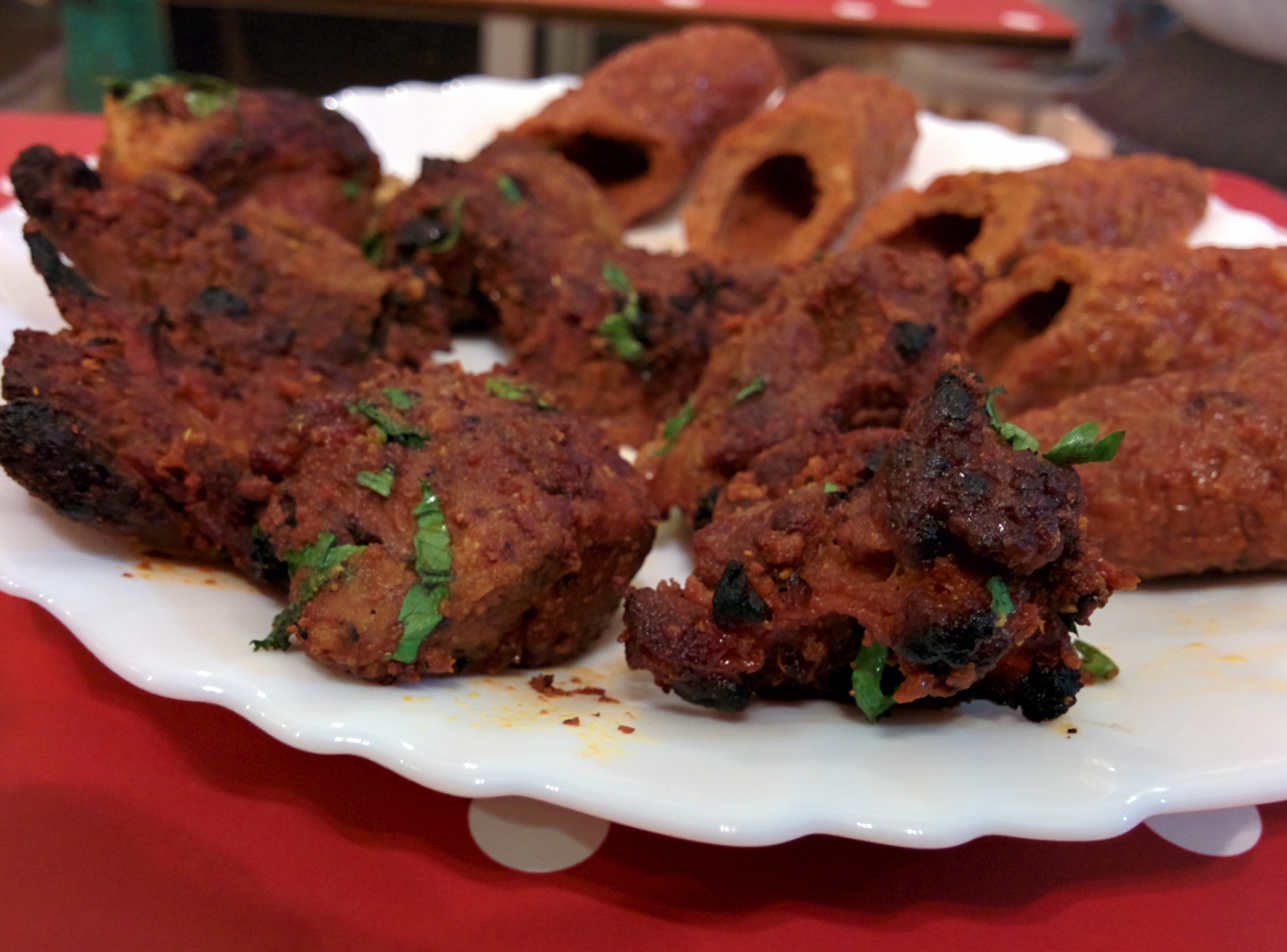
Tujji and Kababs.

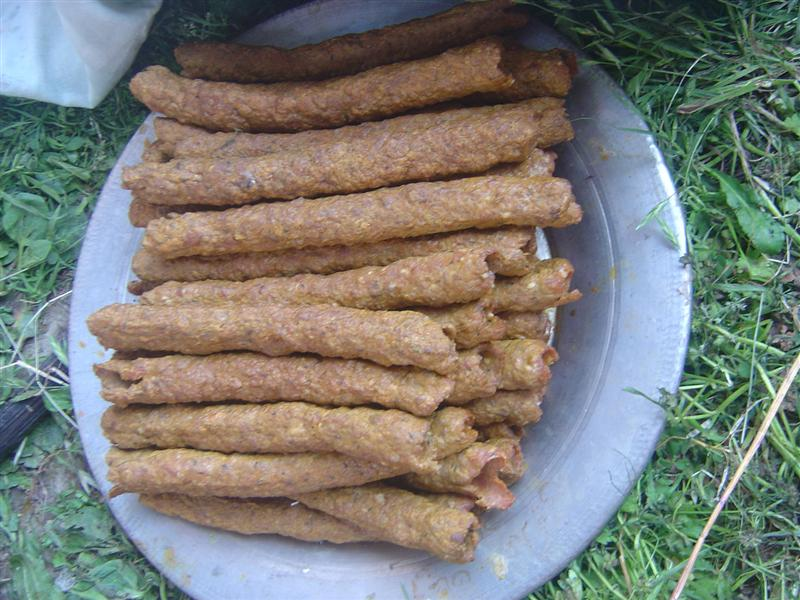
Kashmiri kababs can be eaten as a snack or a meal with rice.

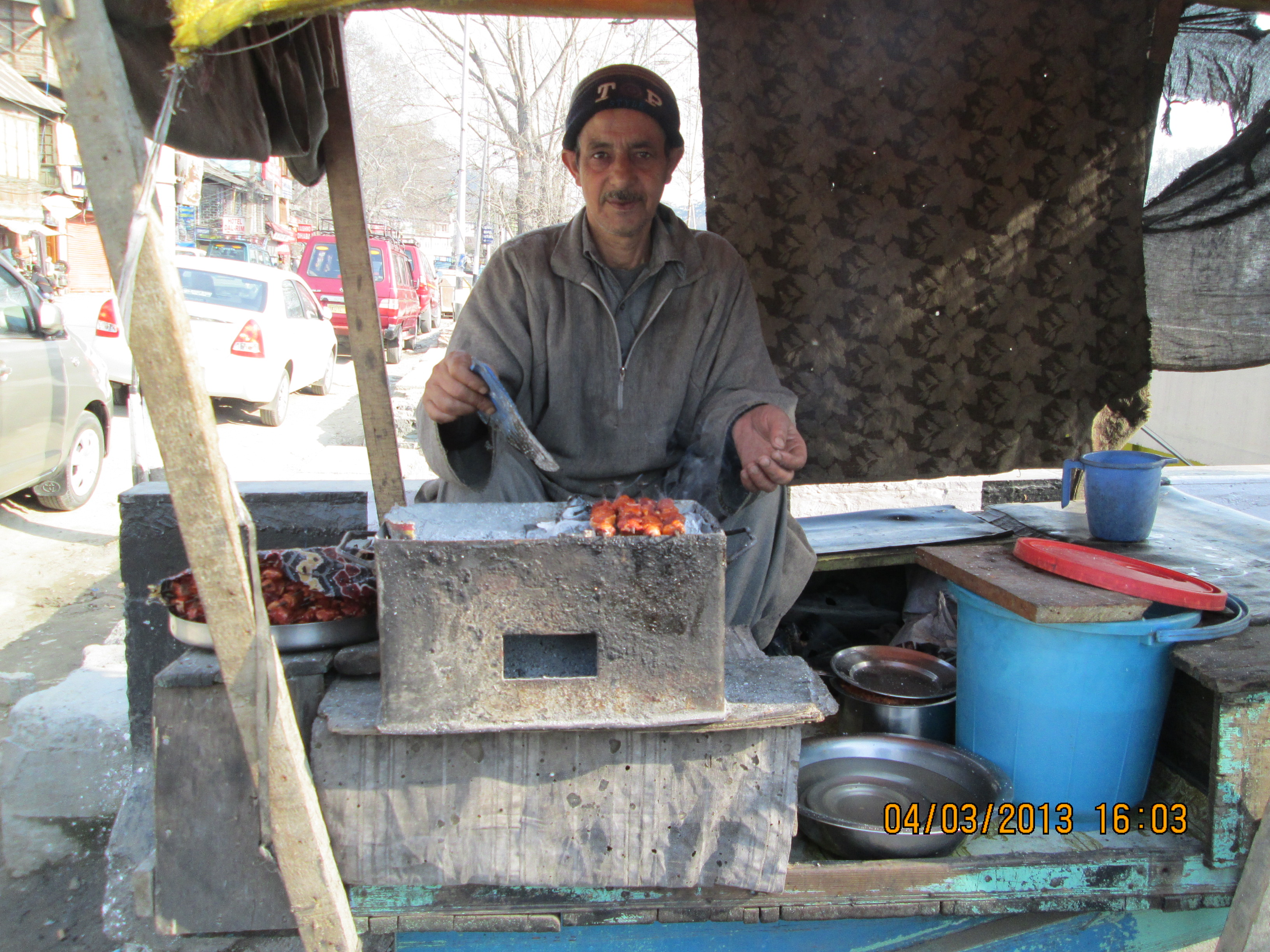
Charcoal barbecue in Srinagar.

One version of the origin of kababs is the one in which Turkish soldiers were first known to grill chunks of meat on open fires. Kashmir's kababs are cooked with local spices and accompanied with dips:

- Kabab, condimented minced meat, roasted or fried, on skewers. According to chef Ghulam Nabi Dar (aka Bitte Waaze), the meat for the kabab is first minced with a very sharp knife (haché au couteau), then it requires an egg, cumin, cardamom and garlic, then it needs to be minced some more until it becomes a paste, then it is mounted on 1 m long skewers to be reheated the day after.
- Kokur kabab, chicken kebab.
- Lahradar kabab, also known as lahabi/moachi kabab. Minced mutton classically shaped like a boat with a depression in the centre, cooked in curd based mild spicy gravy. Once softened, the meat is soaked overnight in egg and at least nine different seasonings and spices, including onions, red chili powder, nutmeg, garam masala, ginger, garlic and coriander. It is typically served with yoghurt.
- Kokur lahabdar kabab ruwangan, chicken kebabs in rich tomato gravy.
- Shammi kabab, wazwan style mutton patties with ground chickpeas, egg and mild Kashmiri spices.
- Champ, lamb chops.
- Nadur maund, Kashmir's answer to hash browns, lotus root ginger and mint patties with a dash of eclectic Kashmiri spices.
- Buzith Tsaman (Note: The Ts represents the voiceless alveolar affricate sound /t͡s/, which corresponds to the Kashmiri letter ژ.), grilled paneer marinated in yoghurt, cream and aniseed. It is said a poet wandering in the lovely forests of Kashmir, cooked this dish out in the open.
- Buzith gaad, charcoal grilled fish marinated with Kashmiri spices.
- Buzith olav, thool, maaz etc., the round oven-baked clay-pot kangir works as an oven for baking food-items such as eggs, potatoes, pea beans, chunks of meat etc.
- Talith gaad, fish marinated in black pepper, cumin and Kashmiri chilli and then shallow-fried.
- Gaad talith ta badaam, fried fish with almonds.
- Talith kokur, Fried chicken.
- Tujji, meat marinated in Kashmiri red chillies and aniseed powder, then barbequed.
- Gaad tujji, fish kababs.
- Tsaaman tujji, Kashmiri style marinated cottage cheese chunks barbecued on a skewer and served with a side of chutney.
- Tshaap (Note: The trigraph Tsh represents Ts aspirated counterpart /t͡sʰ/, which corresponds to the Kashmiri letter ژھ.) maaz, sausages.
- Kaleeng, thick membrane that covers sheep's head, skull and all, chopped coarsely and set to cook with spices and minimal liquid over a low fire for hours.

== Breakfast ==
For the average Kashmiri, breakfast normally means fresh bread from the local bakery and a cup of noon chai (salt tea). While the bread is there in all the seasons for the breakfast, its accompaniments change. Some affordable luxuries include:

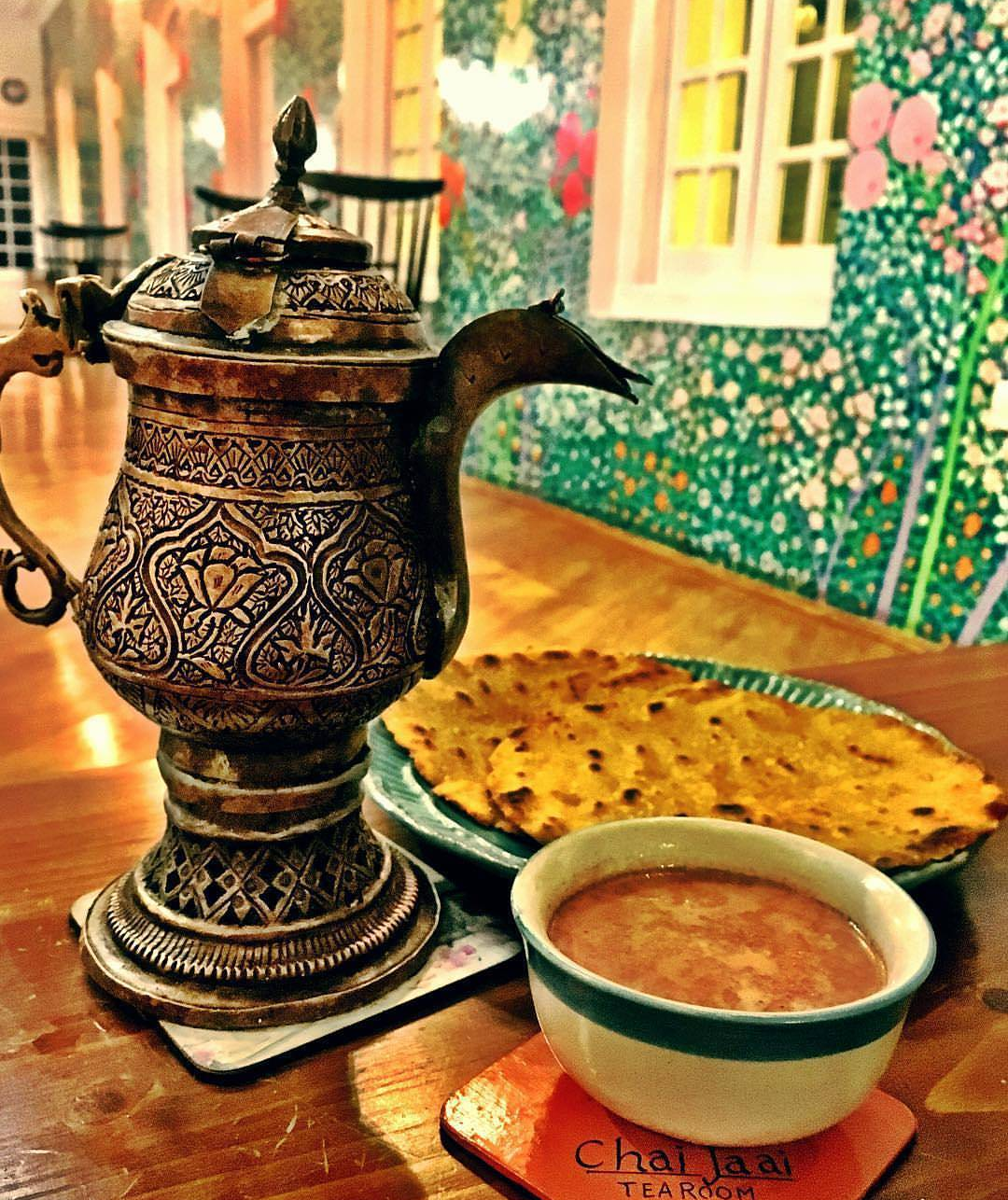
Kashmiri noon chai.

- Harisa, made by specialised cooks called harisaguyr, Harisa is a popular meat preparation made for breakfast, it is slow cooked with spices in a special underground oven for a 24-hour period and hand stirred. A good harisa entails a meticulous mincing of deboned mutton, mixed with local rice, fennel seeds, cinnamon, cardamom and salt. Cooked on sim fire for at least 6 to 8 hours, boiling smoky mustard oil and some milk is poured while the wooden masher continues to stir. Small kebabs are made to be served along with and also a small serving of Methi (lamb's intestines cooked in fenugreek) and tempered onion rings. In legend, an 18th century Afghan governor found the food so tasty he ate himself to death.
- Harisa zafrani, sprinkled with Kashmiri saffron. A maker in Aali Kadal was known for this peculiar dish.
- Luchi & halwa, by luchi makers outside Kheer Bhawani shrine.
- Makai vath, cooked granular maize meal. Used to be a staple food in the unirrigated highland villages, where rice could not be grown.
- Gaer vugra, water chestnut flour porridge. These water chestnuts or buffalo nuts are called gaer in Kashmiri. They grow in shallow waters at many places, especially near the shore of the famous Wular lake. In India, these water chestnuts also grow but are generally bigger in size and have more water content. Generally eaten with churned yoghurt diluted with water (gurus).
- Vushki vath, barley meal porridge. Cooked as a staple food in some hilly villages of Kashmir, where rice or maize is not easily available or grown.

== Wazwan dishes ==
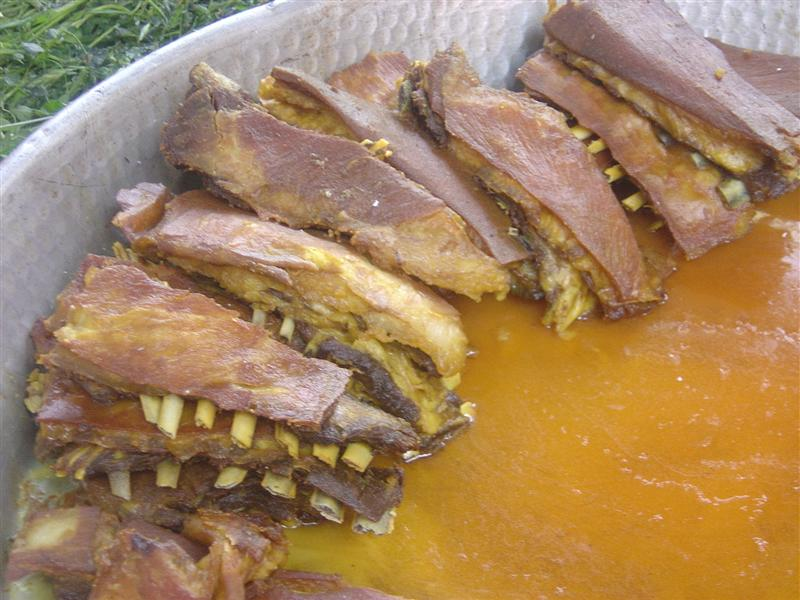
Tabakhmaaz.

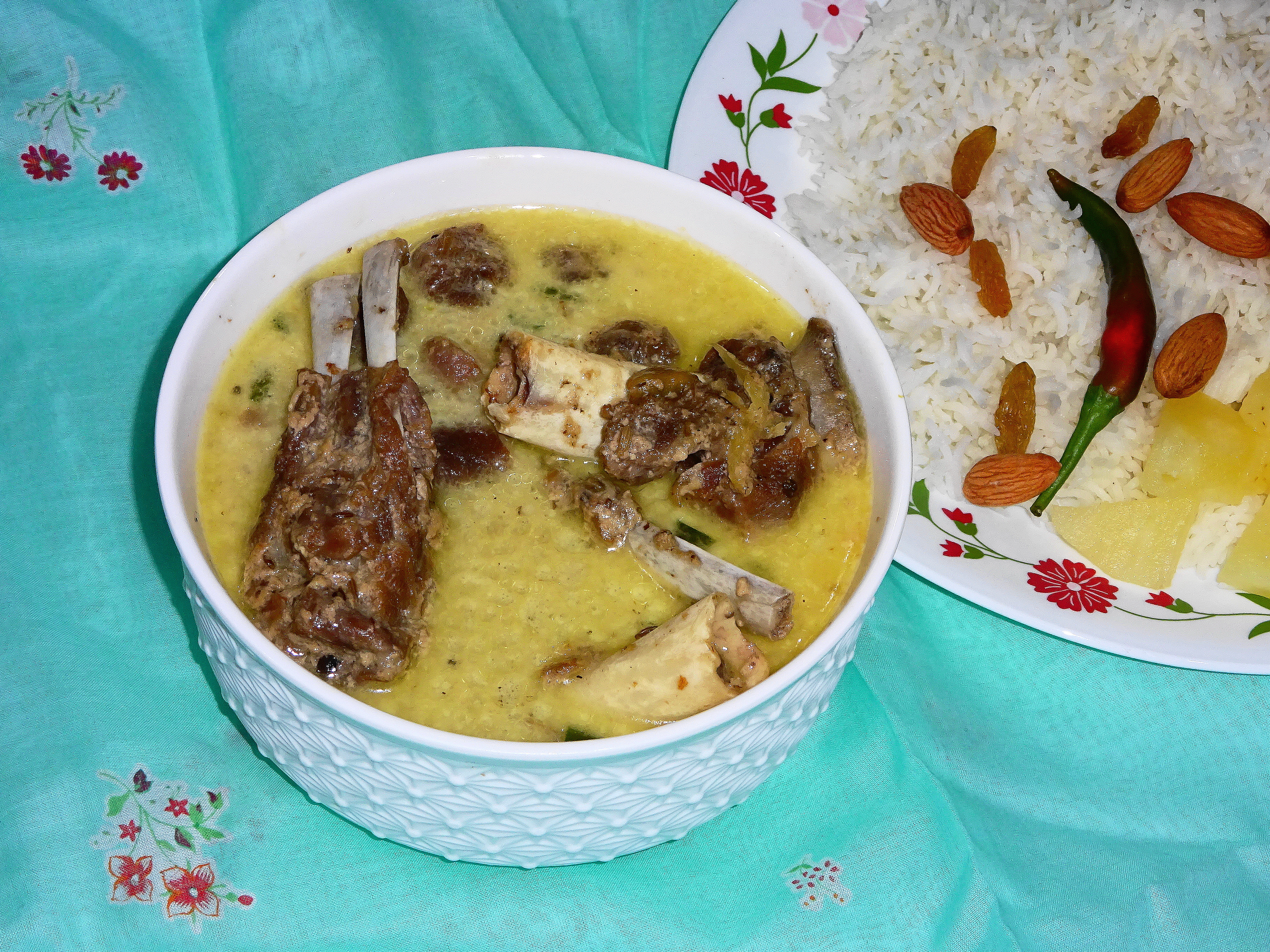
Aab Gosh.

Unlike most dishes of the Indian subcontinent where the flavour is added to the food while cooking on the flames, the wazwan flavours are added while the dish is still uncooked by adding flavoured water to the preparation or soaking in flavoured water (osmosis):

- Tabakhmaaz, rib racks in ghee with sweet fat lodged between lacquered slips of meat Kashmiri Hindus commonly refer to this dish as Qabargah. It seems to have travelled from Kazakhstan where it is known by its Pandit name, Qabargah. While Qabargah is simmered on a low heat for a longer duration and then fried very quickly, Tabakhmaaz is boiled with salt and garlic and characterised by a slightly elastic texture.
- Tang ta lahabi kabab, whole Kashmiri pears and mutton kababs that often go with a tomato-yoghurt gravy.
- Waaza kokur, whole chicken cooked in saffron gravy with mild Kashmiri spices.
- Safed kokur, chicken with white sauce.
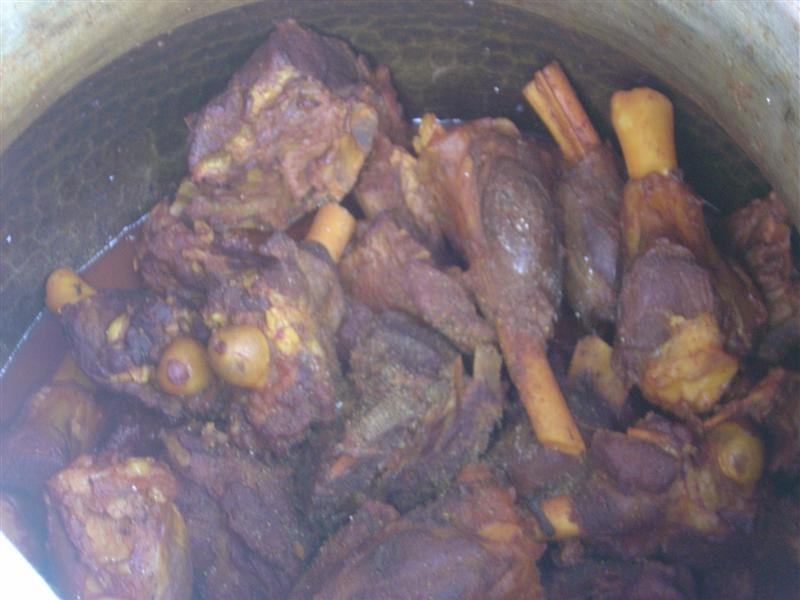
- Dani Phoul.
  Dani phoul, mutton shank.
- Aab gosh, also known as dodhe maaz. A famous milk-based curry cooked in spices and ghee over a low flame. Ten litres of pure cow milk is reduced to one and then mixed with the mutton.
- Methi maaz, mutton intestines flavoured with a spice mixture containing dried fenugreek (methi) leaves.
- Waazeh hedar, Kashmiri wazwan-style mushrooms.
- Martswangan kormeh, meat cooked with spices and yogurt and mostly using Kashmiri red chillies and hot in taste.
- Kokur martsawangan kormeh, Chicken cooked in red hot chilly gravy.
- Aloobukhar kormeh, mince cooked with dried plums.
- Badam kormeh, tender mutton pieces cooked in creamy almond gravy.
- Danival kormeh lamb cooked with coriander or parsley.
- Kokur danival kormeh, chicken cooked in curd based gravy, flavoured with saffron and fresh coriander.
- Monje kael, knol-khol prepared in onion gravy.

== Soups ==
- Tshatt/maaz rass, mutton stock with mutton pieces flavoured with aromatic spices and salt.
- Channa rass, easily made chickpea soup.

== Domestic meat stews ==
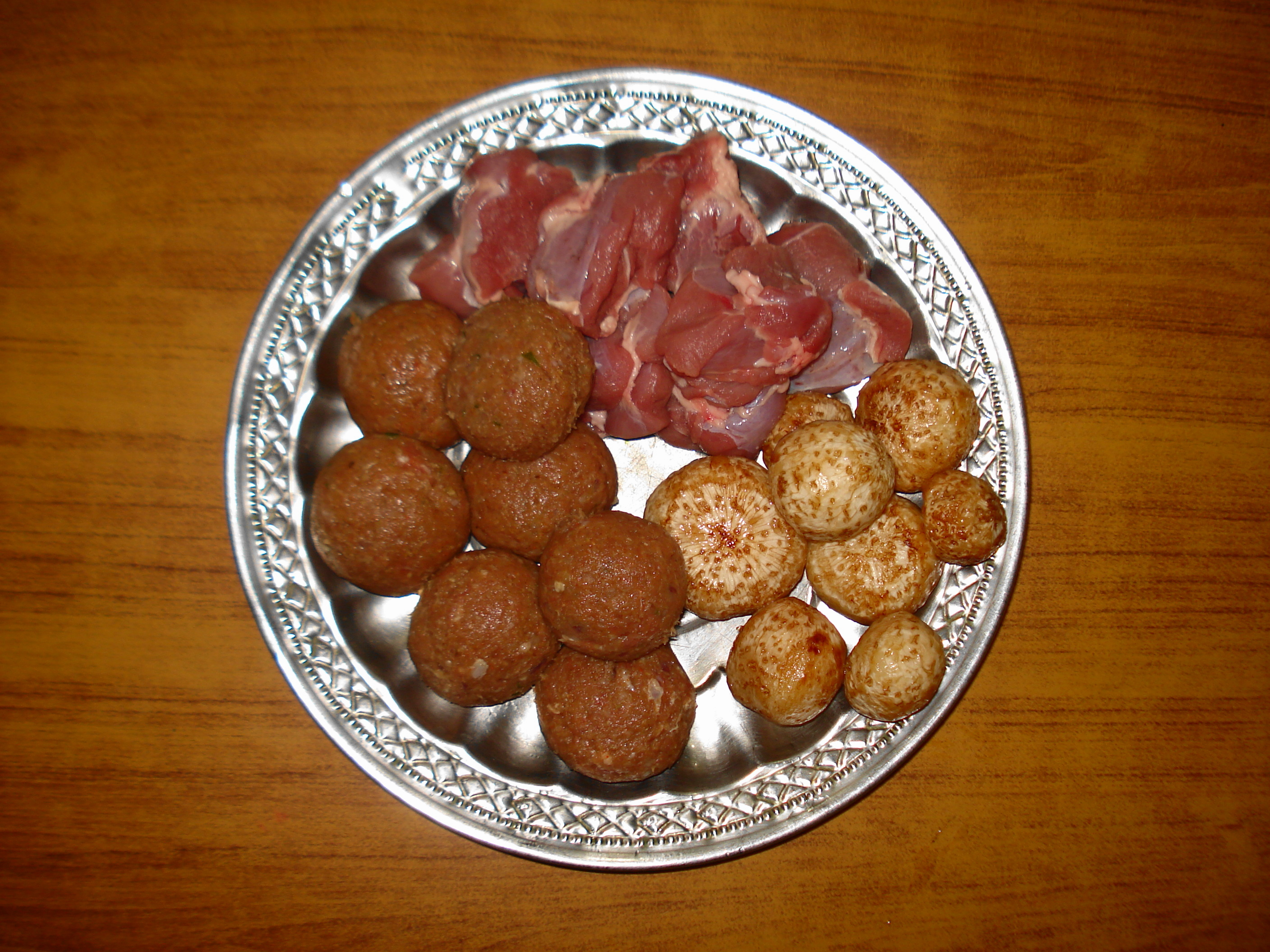
Shab deg, the Kashmiri pot-au-feu

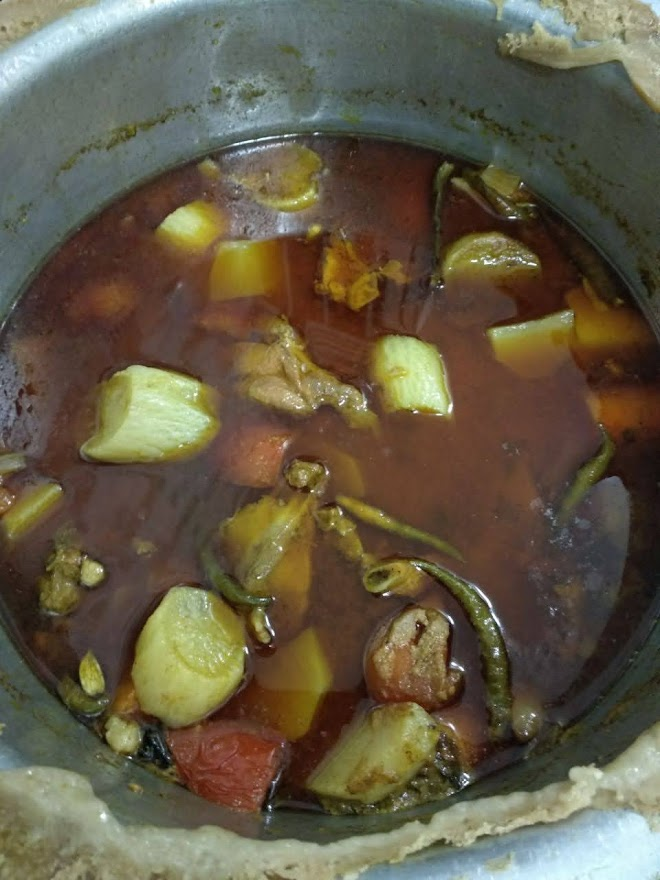
- Shab Deg with chunks.
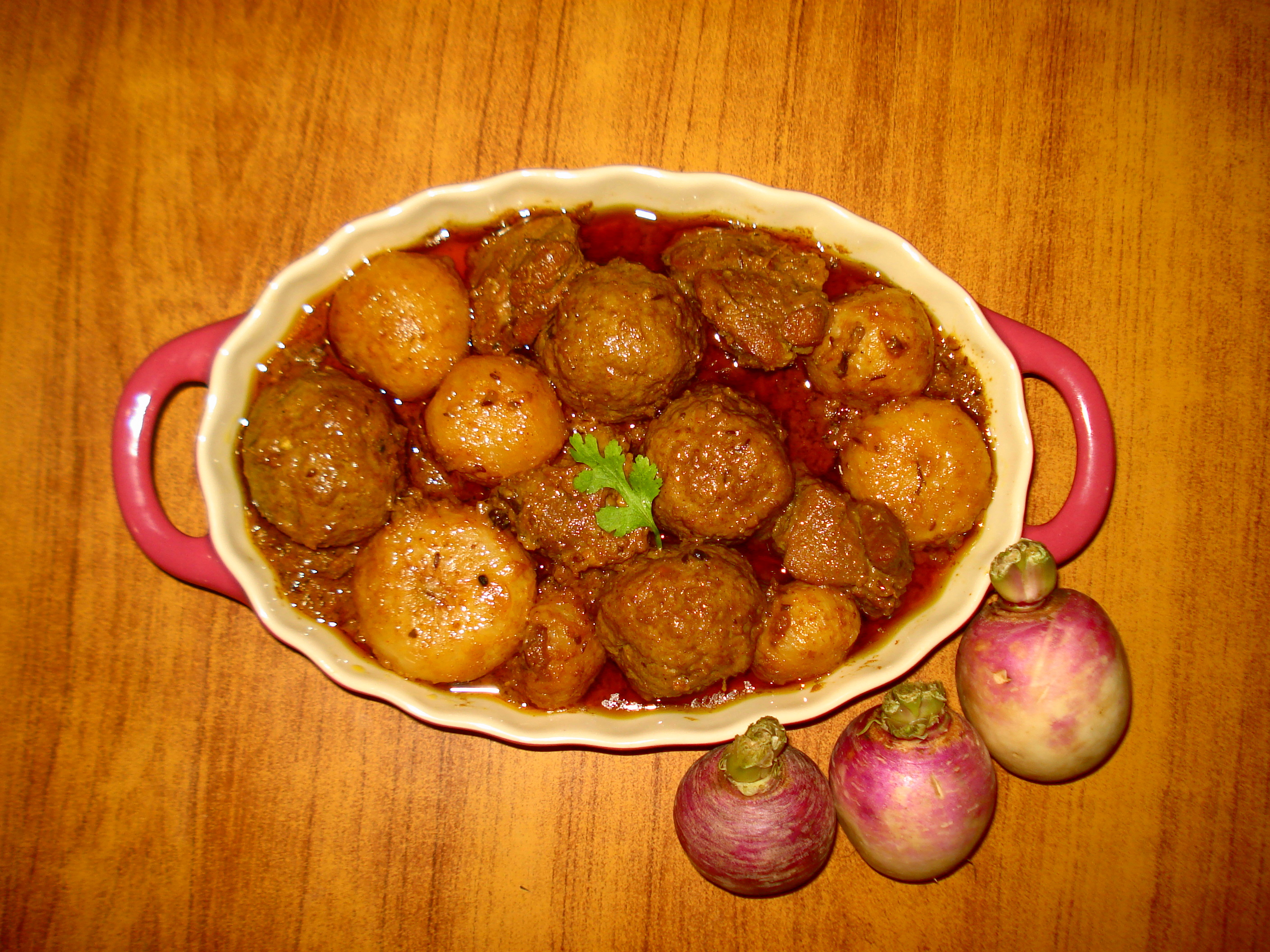
  Shab Deg with Meatballs.
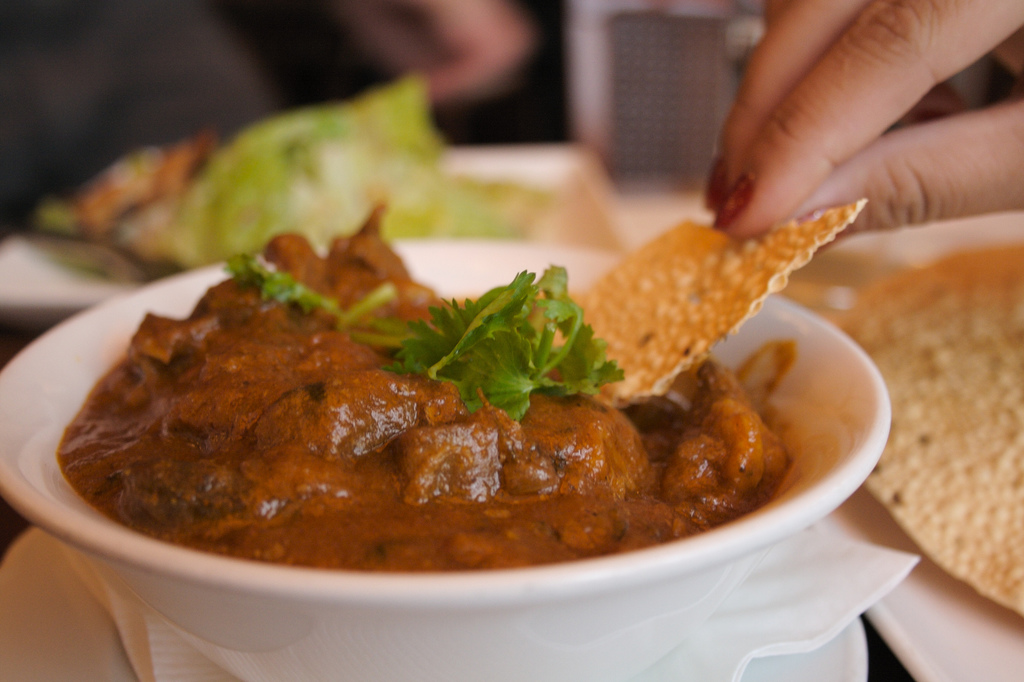
  Rogan josh
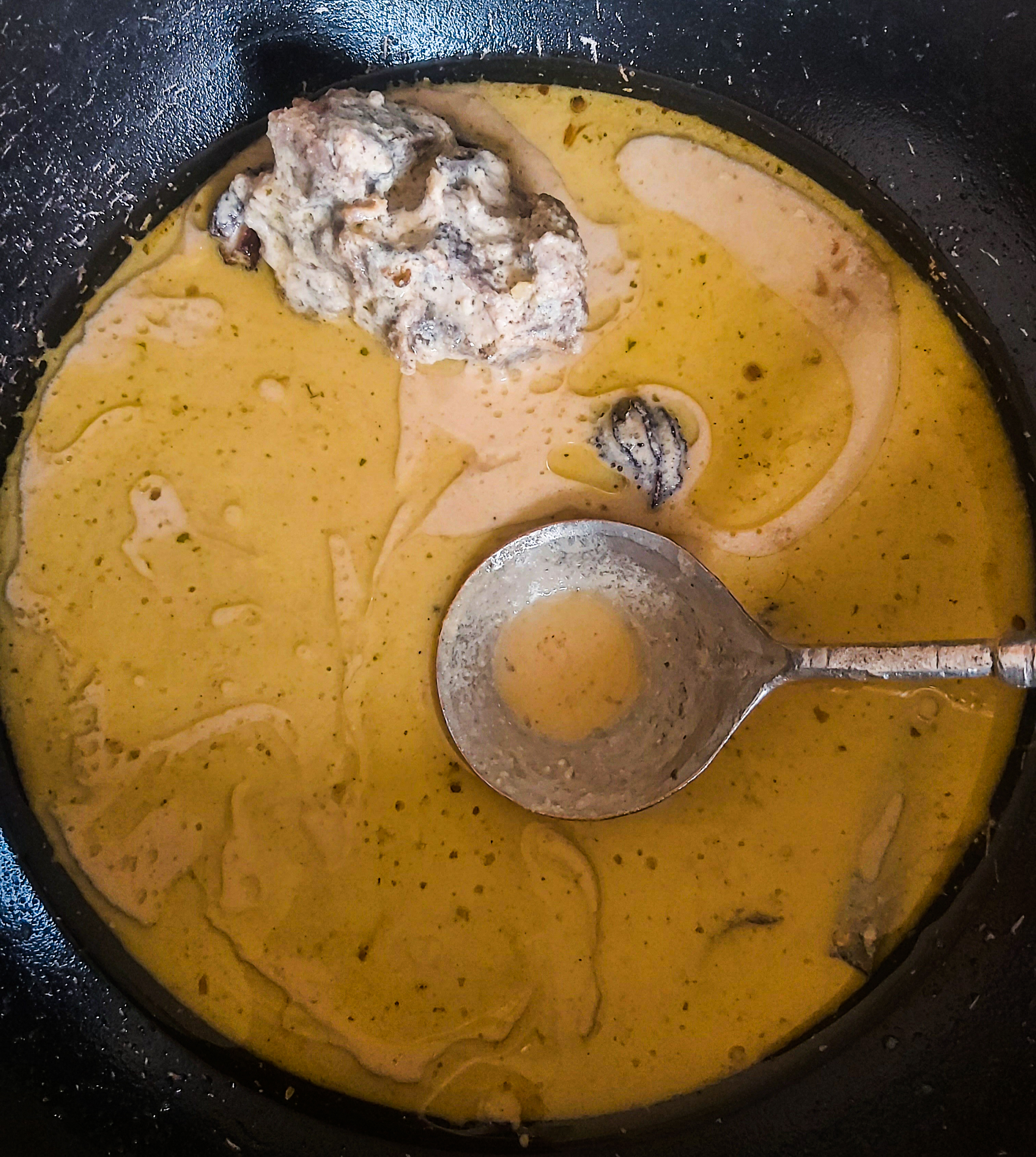
  Yakhein.
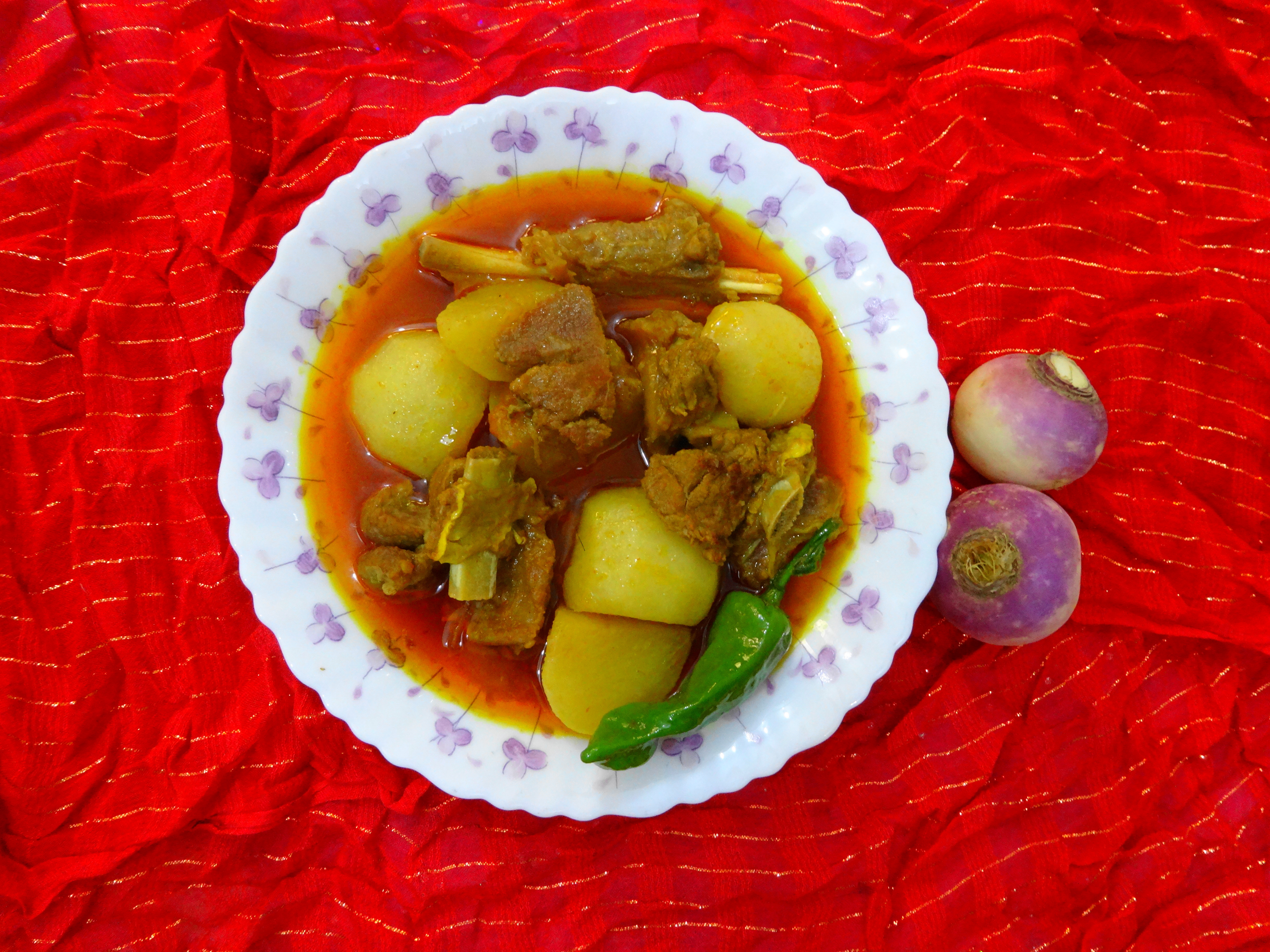
  Gogjee Ta Maaz (Mutton with Turnips).
  Qaliya, a mutton delicacy in which all flavours are included, excluding red chilly powder.
- Kokur qaliya, chicken qaliya.
- Shab Deg: dish cooked with turnip and meat/duck/chicken/beef and balls of ground meat, left to simmer overnight.
- Dani, marrow-bone in gravy.
- Matshgand, lamb meatballs in a gravy tempered with red chillies. A lot of emphasis is put on the shape of the meat (oblong and not round) and the colour of the gravy.
- Methi matsh, muttonballs with fenugreek leaves that have been boiled, crushed or liquidised into a paste.
- Matsh ta tser, lamb fingers with apricot. The dish looks beautiful when laid on the table as the apricots remain yellow and the minced meat red making it very colourful.
- Olav bokhara barith matsch, minced meat balls stuffed with plums.
- Mith ta golemach, minced meat balls with fenugreek.
- Matsh ta phul gupi, minced lamb fingers with cauliflower.
- Matsch ta olav, lamb fingers cooked with potatoes.
- Tser kofta, minced mutton balls with an apricot inside.
- Nadir ta maaz, lotus stems and mutton.
- Nadir, oluv ta maaz, lotus stems, potatoes and mutton cooked on low heat and gravy thickened with garam masala and caraway seeds.
- Maaz vangun, aubergine with meat.
- Kokur aloobukhar korma, chicken cooked with dried plums with Kashmiri ingredients.
- Palak ta kokur, spinach with country chicken.
- Gand ta kokur, chicken and onion curry.
- Kokur ta torreil, chicken with snake gourd.
- Bam chunth ta maaz, quince with lamb.
- Gogjee-aare ta maaz, sundried Turnips with Lamb.
- Gaazar ta maaz, carrots and mutton.
- Bote-tser maaz, lamb and dried apricots.
- Haand ta kokur, dandelion greens and chicken.
- Haand ta maaz, dry dandelion and meat curry. Old age Kashmiri recipe for lactating mothers.
- Haakh maaz, Kashmiri saag cooked with mutton.
- Woste haakh ta maaz, green/red leaves with lamb.
- Monje ta maaz, Kashmiri style knol khol and mutton. Kashmiris don't only eat knol khol, its leaves are mandatory.
- Gole al syun, pumpkin cooked with lamb.
- Torreil ta maaz, ridged gourd with mutton.
- Monje qaliya, kohlrabi with mutton.
- Rogan josh, a lamb based dish, cooked in a gravy seasoned with liberal amounts of Kashmiri chillies (in the form of a dry powder), ginger (also powdered), garlic, onions or asafoetida, gravy is mainly Kashmiri spices and mustard oil based. The Persian and central Asian influence is evident in the large quantities of saffron, and asafoetida, favourite Persian flavourings, and the Mughals cultivated these plants in the subcontinent to provide their cooks with a ready supply. Kashmiri Muslims use praan (a type of shallot), plus garlic and cockscomb flower for colouring. Columnist Vir Sanghvi has nominated it as world's most famous Indian curry.
- Kokur roghan josh, fried chicken cooked in cock's comb flower gravy with Kashmiri condiments.
- Hindi roghan josh, Roghan Josh with tamarind.
- Vunth roghan josh, for the past two decades, camel meat is sold on the occasion of Eid-ul-Azha in keeping with the tradition of Muhammad who mostly used to sacrifice camels on holy occasions.
- Pachi roghan josh, trotter in red gravy.
- Yakhean, a yoghurt-based mutton gravy without turmeric or chilli powder. The dish is primarily flavoured with bay leaves, cloves and cardamom seeds. This is a mild, subtle dish eaten with rice often accompanied with a more spicy side dish. Yakhean came to be known in Kashmir during Akbar's rule. Yoghurt-based meat curries were part of Persian cuisine, and the emperor introduced this style of cooking to his new state when he annexed it in 1586.
- Kokur yakhean, succulent pieces of chicken cooked in curd flavoured in Kashmiri herbs.
- Shyaem, minced mutton cutlets cooked with curd.
- Kokur shyaem, chicken cutlets in yoghurt.

== Innards and offal ==
- Chuste, spicy dry curry of goat's intestines.
- Naihkala ta phendeir yakhean, certain parts of innards of sheep or goat, cooked with curd.
- Tshagael yakhean, testes of sheep or goat cooked in curd etc.
- Damin yakhean, tripe yakhni (curd curry).
- Bokavachi Tshagael, kidneys and testes of goat or sheep.
- Tsarvan, cooked diced liver of sheep or goat.
- Tsoek Tsarvan, sour diced liver of goat or sheep.
- Tsarvan oluv, curried liver and potatoes.
- Kalle maaz, goat's head meat.
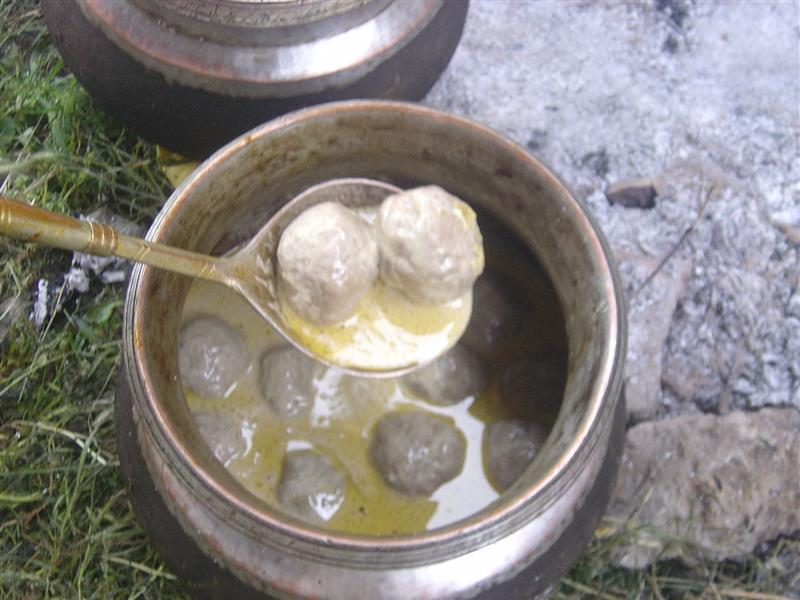
- Goshtabeh.
  Pachi ta heri rass, cooked legs with hoofs, and head of sheep or goat.

== Meatballs ==
The wazas are trained for years to learn techniques for making cuts and grinding meat. Traditionally, the lamb is mashed with walnut wood:

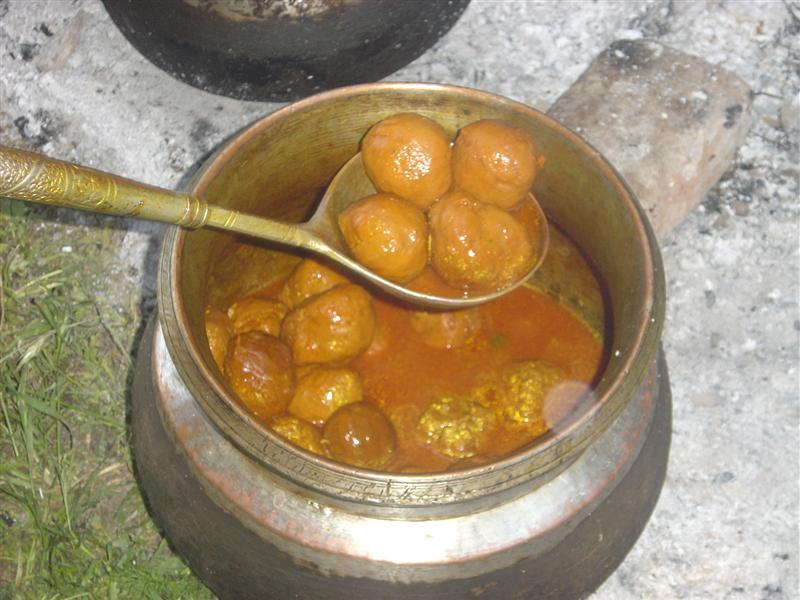
Riste.

- Goshtabeh minced mutton balls with spices in yogurt gravy. Also known as 'The Dish of Kings' in Kashmir region and the last dish of the banquet. Jawaharlal Nehru once named it 'the cashmere of meats'. The Bollywood actor Yusuf Khan aka Dilip Kumar was said to love goshtabeh the most. In December 1955, Bakshi Ghulam Mohammad, the then Prime Minister of Jammu and Kashmir and Nikita S. Khurschev, the first secretary of the Soviet Communist party were photographed feeding each other goshtabeh.
- Beef riste.
- Beef goshtabeh. Pulverised beef with 25 per cent fat is pounded into a pulpy mass and seasoned before being shaped into meatballs. It is then immersed in a seasoned hot water bath, before being placed in a bubbling-hot broth of well-churned yoghurt, laced with milk and some beef stock and cooked to a semi-thick consistency. The original recipe calls for very fatty buffalo meat.
- Palak riste, usually four small 'rista' pieces, along with some spinach Leaves, are ladled on a 'Traem' for four guests.
- Safed riste, Goshtabeh meatballs are the biggest, next rista and palak rista meatballs are the tiniest.

== Vegetarian sides ==
Kashmir produces tons of vegetables and forest produce. The traditional dishes are:

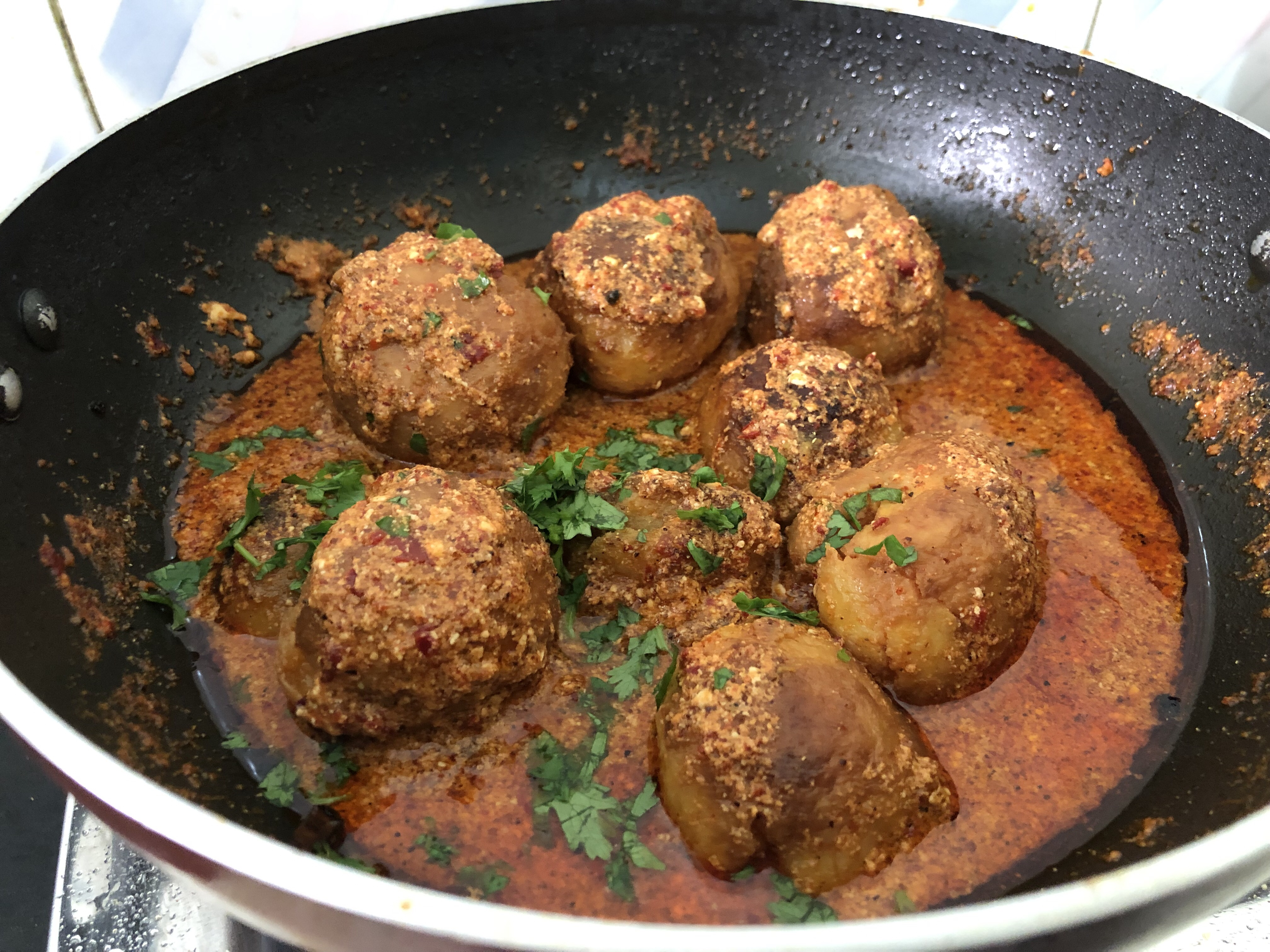
Dum Olav.

- Dum olav/Dum aloo, potato cooked with ginger powder, fennel and other hot spices. The most skilful part is to prick potatoes after frying them so that the gravy or the sauce gets absorbed in the potato, making them spongy.
- Wazel aelwa, forgotten aloo recipe mostly cooked in the villages.
- Matar olav, potatoes peas curry. A side dish that is regularly paired with white rice (batta).
- Olav dude legit, potatoes in yoghurt.
- Gande te matar, onions and peas.
- Gande te hemb, green beans and onions gravy.
- Boda razmaah ta olav, green beans and potatoes.
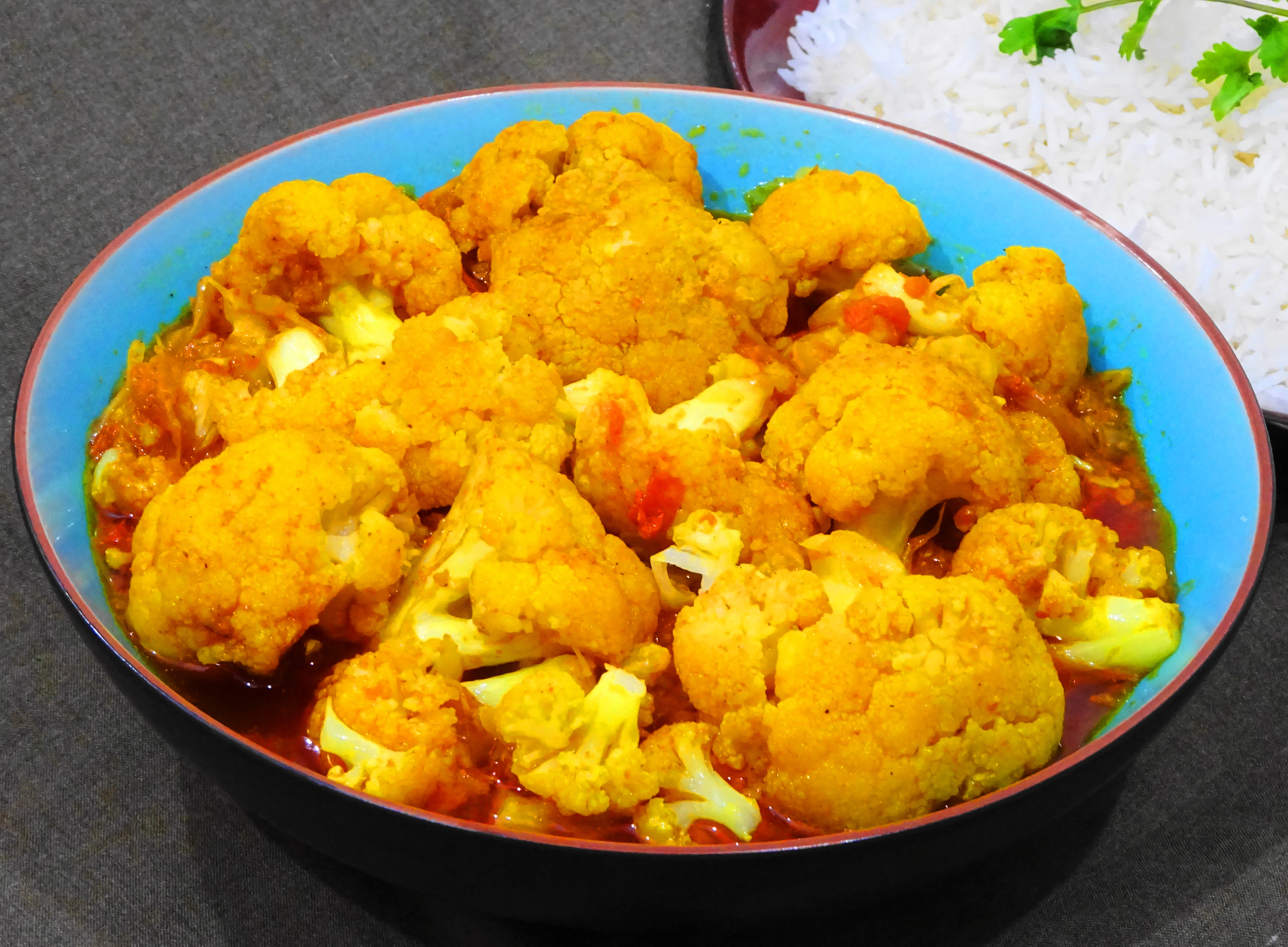
- Dum Phul Gupi (cauliflower).
  Razmah hemb ta nadir, spicy French beans with lotus stems.
- Razmah hemb ta vangan, French beans with aubergine.
- Band gupi ta tamatar, cabbage cooked with tomatoes.
- Nadir palak, lotus roots and spinach. This is a side dish served in big feasts and dinners.
- Ranith bam Tsunth khanji, cooked quince. Quince is a very popular fruit with Kashmiri people. In olden days, it was baked in daans (clay ovens).
- Bam Tsunth vangun, quince and eggplants.
- Bam Tsunth nadir, quince with lotus stem.
- Dued vangan, eggplants with yoghurt.
- Karel ta vangun, Kashmiri karela baingan (bitter gourd and eggplants).
- Al lanej ta vangan, pumpkin greens with aubergine.
- Tsounth vangan, green apple curry. Apples and aubergines, both are sliced long and fried. The oil is tempered with asafoetida (yangu) and the usual spices. If apples are on the sweeter side, a few drops of lemon juice are added. The dish is most often made in the autumn.
- Tsoek vangan-hachi, sundried eggplant instead of the fresh vegetable.
- Gole al doon gooje, pumpkin with walnuts.
- Gande dued, fried onions mixed with milk.
- Hoch haand, dried dandelion greens, boiled and ground to a pasty texture.
- Ruwangun hachi, dried tomatoes.
- Monje Haakh, kholrabi being a delicacy.
- Dum Monje, knol khol (karam/gaanth gobhi/kohlrabi/ German turnip) in Yoghurt.
- Dum Phul Gupi, cauliflowers cooked in their own moisture.
- Phul Gupi Olav, cauliflower with potatoes.
- Haakh, wosteh haakh (red orach), heanz haakh, sotsal (mallow), kretsh (knapweed), haand (dandelion), obuj (sorrel), lissa (amaranth), among others. Collard greens are prepared with cottage cheese, mutton or chicken.
- Nunnar, purslane.
- Batte haakh, also known as Sabz Haakh. Batte is Kashmiri for Pandit. Haakh is eaten by everyone in Kashmir, but is a Kashmiri Pandit speciality.
- Dagith haakh, mashed collard greens.
- Gogjee haakh, turnip greens with a pinch of asafoetida. The hardy leafy green, thrives in winter conditions and becomes a crucial ingredient in the local cuisine. By using mustard oil, cumin seeds, and a medley of aromatic spices, the dish infuses the flavours of its distinctive blend.
- Wapal haakh, teasel leaves (Dipsacus Inermis).
- Wosteh haakh ta zombre thool, orach paired with hard-boiled eggs.
- Haakh nadir, collards or kales cooked with lotus roots.
- Haakh ta olav, potatoes and greens.
- Haakh vangan, collard greens with brinjal.
- Sotsal nadur, mallow (Malva Parviflora) is a wild vegetable found anywhere on the roadsides, parks, playgrounds, grazing lands, etc.
- Sotsal vangan, mallow leaves and baigan. The dish is made from sotchal and thool-vangan. Thool-Vangan is a small eggplant that has not grown into its full size. It is soft and fleshy with a minimal amount of seeds.
- Mujji mulivian, mashed radish leaves curry.
- Mujje patar ta vangan, radish leaves with aubergine.
- Zamutdodh cuar, yoghurt curry stirred continuously on low heat.
- Olav bum, a dry dish prepared with potatoes and water lily plant commonly found in ponds and lakes of Kashmir.
- Bandh roghan josh, cabbage simmered in a fusion of authentic spices, and yoghurt to create the vegetarian 'sibling' of Roghan Josh.
- Nadir roghan josh, lotus root cooked on low heat until the nadur is tender.
- Tshte gogjee, turnips.
- Tshte mujji, boiled and mildly spiced radishes.
- Tshte band gupi, boiled and mildly spiced cabbage (with asafoetida).
- Tsoek nadir, lotus-root with tartaric acid (tatri).
- Tsoek mujji/mujji kalaa, long radishes with tamarind paste.
- Tsoek al, gourd with tamarind.
- Al yakhean, bottle-gourd cooked in yoghurt based gravy and flavoured with Kashmiri condiments.
- Hedar yakhean, mushrooms yakhni.
- Nadir yakhean, lotus root cooked with yoghurt.
- Nutree yakhean, soya chunks yakhni.
- Karel yakhean, prepared bitter gourds cooked until gravy thickens with yogurt.
- Vangan yakhean, fried aubergine in yoghurt.
- Pudna al, pumpkin with mint.
- Torreil ta vangan, ridged gourd with eggplant. This vegetable is available in the summer and has a sweet taste.
- Torreil ta tamatar, ridged gourd with tomatoes.
- Variphali olav, potato curry with hot lentil dumplings. This dish is a Punjabi preparation.

== Mushrooms ==
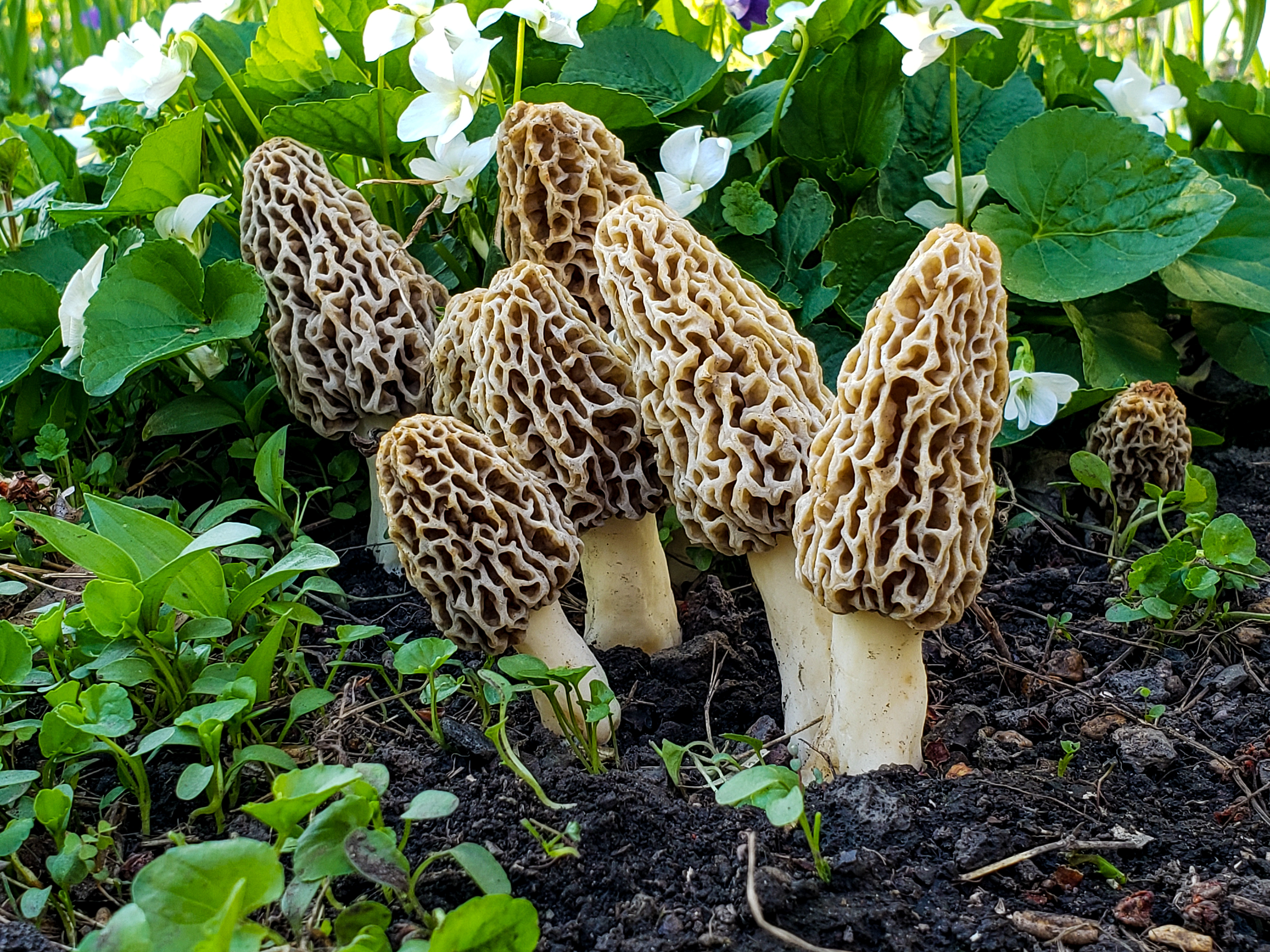
The much-prized kanaguchhi (Morchella esculenta)

Native to the Himalayan foothills, Guchhi or kanaguchhi mushrooms (species in the genus Morchella, commonly known as morels elsewhere) are highly prized in Kashmir . With the exception of a few very limited and experimental successes, efforts to cultivate (kana)guchhi or morels at a large scale have been unsuccessful and consumption relies on the harvest of wild mushrooms.

Traditional or well known dishes include:

- Kanaguchhi yakhean, morels cooked in rich yoghurt gravy.
- Kanaguchhi matar masala
- Guchhi Ver, kanaguchhi (Morchella esculenta) mushroom with traditional Kashmiri spice mix, an uncommon dish cooked by Suman Kaul, a self-trained masterchef.
- Shajkaan, aka Kanpapar (Geopora arenicola) mushroom, fried with onions and tomatoes, or even prepared with milk.

== Tsaaman ==
Paneer is called Tsaaman in Kashmiri. The spicing falls into the sweet-savoury spectrum which means using a lot of cinnamon, mace and clove alongside earthier spices like cumin seed and ground coriander. The scarcity of fresh ginger in mountain geography also means that ground ginger is a spice staple. Paneer recipes are:

- Tsaaman Kanti, cubes of cottage cheese that are fried, tossed in select spices and stir fried with onions and tomatoes.
- Lyader Tsaaman. lyadur means yellow which is due to the presence of turmeric, and tsaaman is cottage cheese. The term 'yellow gravy' might not do justice to the complexity of flavor you get from layering nine spices, some of them whole, with green chilies and simmering them in water before thickening the sauce with milk.
- Veth Tsaaman, also known as Vozij Tsaaman. This is the rogan josh equivalent.
- Ruwangan Tsaaman, cottage cheese in tomato gravy.
- Palak/Haakh Tsaaman, cottage cheese prepared in spinach based gravy peppered with Kashmiri ingredients.
- Mith Tsaaman, panir with fenugreek.
- Mith Tsaaman Ta Niul Kara, panir and fenugreek with green peas.
- Matar Tsaaman, turmeric matar paneer. Traditionally, the paneer is meant to be deep fried.
- Torreil Ta Tsaaman, ridged gourd with paneer.
- Tsaaman Monje Qaliya, kohlrabi with paneer. Used to be made in big degchis on mehendiraat.
- Kanaguchhi Tsaaman, Kashmiri morels with paneer in a tangy gravy.
- Gogjee-aare Ta Tsaaman, dried turnips with cottage cheese.
- Tsaaman Vangan, panir and brinjals.

== Chutneys and raitas ==
Called the shadowy underbelly of the Kashmiri wazwan, they add colour to dishes. They are expected to be served free, when Kashmiris go out to eat or pack food. The varieties of spicy spreads are:

- Zamut Dodh, plain homemade yoghurt.
- Muj Tsetin, grated radish in yoghurt, seasoned with roasted cumin. The Kashmiri version of raita.
- Doon muj Tsetin, walnut-radish raita.
- Zeresht Tsetin, Barberry.
- Anardan Tsetin, prepared with dried pomegranate seeds (called anardana) along with coriander and mint leaves.
- Zirish Tsetin. Blackcurrants.
- Aelchi Tsetin, sour cherries with a bit of salt.
- Gordoul Tsetin, sour plum chutney.
- Pudna Tsetin/Buran, a light chutney made out of green chillies and fresh mint.
- Ruwangun Tsetin, tomatoes sautéed with green chillies and oil, until most of their juices evaporate.
- Ruwangun Haech Tsetin, sun-dried tomato chutney.
- Martswangun Tsetin, green chilli chutney ground in a mortar.
- Rohani Tsetin, garlic chutney with red chilies.
- Kishmish Tsetin, condimented sauce of raisins.
- Tsounth Ta Danival Tsetin, apple and coriander chutney.
- Aloo Bukhar Tsetin, made with fresh plums, onions, sugar, lime juice and spices.
- Muj Tsetin (variation), sautéed grated radish in mustard oil.
- Buzith Nadir Tsetin, roasted lotus stem chutney.
- Buza/Phata Vangan, roasted/boiled and mashed brinjals mixed with curd.
- Dodh Al/Al Raita, bottle Gourd in yoghurt.

== Meat stir-fries ==
- Mutton/Chicken Kanti, small boneless mutton/chicken pieces, marinated, shallow fried in fresh onions, tomatoes and green chillies.
- Matsh Barith Karel, bitter gourd stuffed with minced lamb.
- Matar Matsh, green Peas and Minced Mutton.
- Sotsal Tsarvan, mallow leaves and liver.
- Hedar, Tshagael, Bokavachi, Ta Krehnamaz, mushrooms with testes, kidneys and liver of sheep or goat.
- Talith Kaed, fried brains of goat or sheep.
- Kaed Pakod, brain fritters.

== Fish ==
The practice of shadow fishing is locally known as Tshaayi Gaad in Anchar lake in the Soura vicinity of Srinagar city. Fishermen row their boats early in the morning, breaking the frozen part of the lake to catch fish with a harpoon. They create a shadow on the nook of their boat by hiding themselves under a blanket or a makeshift umbrella made of straw to attract the fish and later strike the approaching fish with the harpoon. The banks of the lake of yore used to be dotted with thickets of willow trees under whose shadow the fish would take refuge during summers, thereby easing the task for the local fishermen to catch them. Common fish dishes are:

- Nader ti Gaad, fish (Bilose, Zob, Indian Major Carp, Catla, Rohu, Margarita, Mahseer, Snow Trout, Niger, Chush, Khront, Churu etc.) cooked with lotus stem, a delicacy cooked on festival days like Eid, Navroze and Gaadi Batti (Festival of Kashmiri Pandits).
- Mujh Gaad, a dish of radishes with a choice of fish.
- Haak Gaad, Fish curry cooked with kashmiri spinach.
- Gada Ta Gogjee/Monjje/Band Gupi, Fish cooked with Turnips, or Knol Khol, or Cabbage.
- Gaad Ta Tsounth, fish cooked with green apples.
- Gaad Qaliya, fish in yellow gravy.
- Ruwangan/Tamatar Gaad, white river fish cooked delicately in a tomato gravy.
- Kong Gaad, fish with saffron flowers.
- Gaad Leij, trout fish cooked in traditional Kashmiri style and served with vegetables such as nadur, etc.
- Gaad Ta Obuj, wild obuj(rumex obtusifolius) with fish.
- Hogada Ta Haakh/Bum, dried fish (bolinao and others) with 'karam' saag or dried water-lily stems.
- Hogada Tsyout, roasted dried small fish.
- Kanz Ta Gaad/Guran, fish or small fish or very small dried fish, cooked with slightly fermented but non-alcoholic drink sadre kaenz. In the old days, when one family in a neighbourhood would make kaenz it was understood it belonged equally to the rest to be used whenever required. The heat of the generously used spices like chili and ginger powder in this popular dish is supposed to be tempered by the cooling effect of this rice beer-like brew.
- Fari/Phari, smoked fish. A winter delicacy prepared in a particular method by only a few remaining households in Srinagar's Tiploo Mohalla. The fish used is a variety of trout belonging to the genus Schizothorax.
- Phari Ta Haakh, smoked fish with collard greens. The skin of the smoked fish is removed and it is fried until it turns reddish-brown. The fish is added to collard greens and cooked until all the water is absorbed and oil floats on top. Best had with steamed rice, and best not to reheat the dish.

== Salads ==
- Salaad, a plate of sliced vegetables precisely cucumber, tomatoes and carrots, decorated in concentric circles on a plate. A side with lemon squeezed on top.
- Razmah Salaad/Chat, kidney beans salad.

== Rice ==
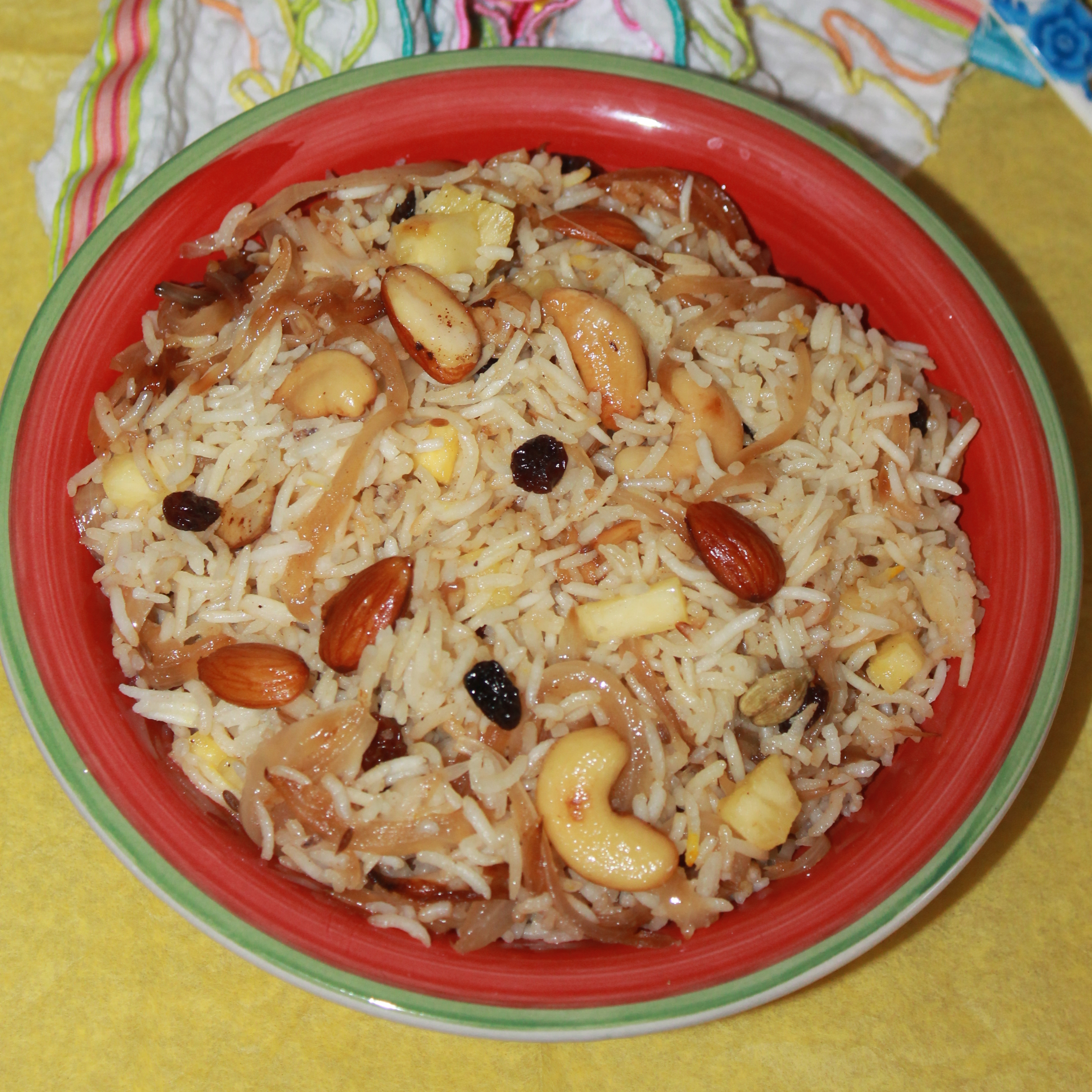
Kashmiri polav.

Kashmiris eat much more rice than the people of the Jammu region:

- Batta, steamed white rice.
- Buzz Batta, fried rice.
- Wazul Batta, a high-nutrition red rice snack for pregnant ladies.
- Taayi Batta, Kashmiri-style pan-fried rice.
- Gucchi Polav, Kashmiri pulao with black morels.
- Matar Polav, a variation of plain rice with peas, fresh or frozen added.
- Tahaer, yellow rice. Prepared by Pandits on auspicious occasions, Muslims also prepare it on certain occasions.
- Khetsar, made with rice and chilke wali moong dal, it is sometimes eaten with monje aanchar.
- Neni Moonge Khetchar, mutton and whole green lentils cooked in mustard oil and finished on dum with Basmati rice.
- Vaer, Salted Rice Pudding with kernels of walnuts or intestines of sheep or goat. Always cooked by Kashmiri Pandits at the beginning of Weddings or 'Yagneopavit' ceremony.
- Mayir, saltish pudding of rice cooked with diluted curd from which generally butter has been separated. Mostly prepared in rural areas particularly after a week or so on the happy occasion of the delivery of a cow.
- Yaji, boiled and steam-cooked salty rice-flour cakes.
- Batta Laaye/Mur-murei/Chewrei, rice munchies.
- Byael Tomul, a snack made from leftover fermented newly sprouted paddy seeds. It is sun-dried and baked in an earthen vessel placed upon a choola (oven), cooled and pounded in a wooden mortar. After cleaning the husk, it is eaten with dry walnut kernels and salt tea.

== Breads ==
- Kinke Tsot, a whole wheat unleavened flatbread cooked on a griddle.
- Parott, a buttery flatbread. A one-kilo paratha is served outside a Sufi shrine in Kashmir. Celebrity chef Sanjeev Kapoor has stated he used to make rumali roti but not such a big paratha.
- Puer, small round of deep fried and puffed wheaten cake. Served hot, these are relished with vegetable preparations or sweet dishes.
- Tshur Tsot, Spicy rice crêpes typically eaten with breakfast chai.
- Zyur Tsot, this savoury pancake is prepared from rice flour, cumin and green chillies.
- Tomul Tsot, rotis made with rice flour.
- Dranna, rice bread crumbs.
- Makai Tsot, corn flour chapatti.
- Gyav Tsot, as the name suggests, made with generous amounts of ghee, served with rogan josh.
- Makai Woer, afternoon bread prepared with corn flour that is relished with tea.
- Gari Tsot, bread made from water chestnut flour.
- Gari Puer, deep fried small rounds of water chestnut flour.
- Vushki Tsot, baked rounds of barley flour.

== Eggs ==
In certain rural areas, the tradition of putting an egg or two in kanger (fire pot) is known to each individual. The fragrance of an egg cooking in the kanger would trigger the enzymes signalling the egg is ready:

- Thool Mond, omelette.
- Haak Ta Thool, collard greens and Eggs together.
- Prezdar Ta Thool, Foxtail lilies with eggs, eaten locally in Kupwara.
- Wosteh Haakh Ta Thool, red spinach with eggs.
- Zombre Thool Ta Dal, a Kashmiri traditional dish of red lentils (masoor) and hard-boiled eggs.
- Thool Zambur, Kashmiri egg curry.
- Gogjee-aare Ta Zombre Thool, dried turnip and boiled egg.
- Zombre Thool Ta Ruwangan Hachi, fried eggs in a tomato reduction with ginger, garlic and green chillies.
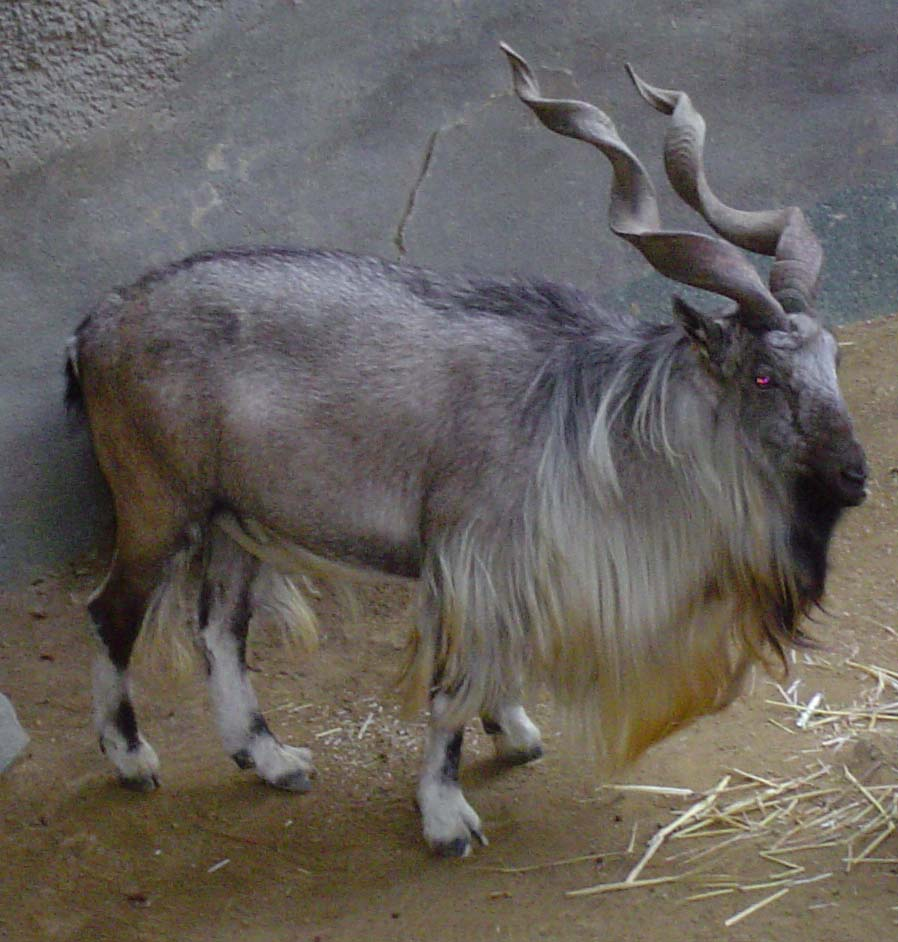
- Markhor (capra falconeri).
  Thool Ta Obuj, kashmiri obuj, a wild growing plant with a sour taste, with eggs.

== Game (shikaar) ==
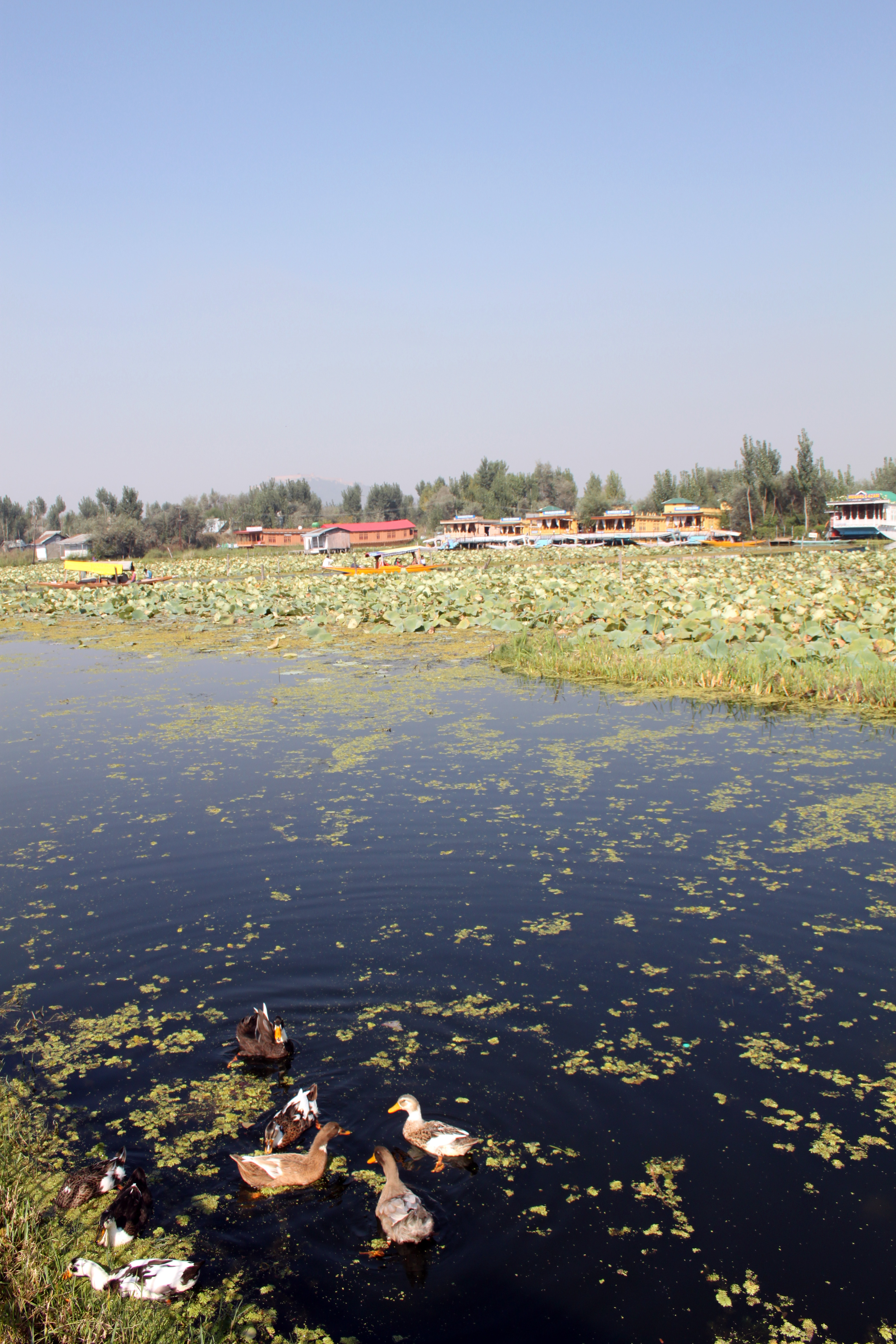
Ducks on Dal Lake.

An estimated 50-60 birds are killed every day in wetlands across Kashmir. Hunted game (shikaar) is not generally cooked immediately, but hung for several days before being dressed. This step is understood to make the meat more tender.

In British India, markhor (screw horn goat) was considered to be among the most challenging game species. It is the largest wild goat in the world. It is locally regarded as the tastiest wild meat.

Indian wild boar was introduced in the Himalayan region by Maharaja Gulab Singh, a Dogra military general. Its meat was considered a great delicacy for the Dogras and Sikhs, but after 1947 its population started dwindling in the Muslim-majority region.

Game dishes are:

- Pacchin Dumpokhta, pintail. Called the king of the winter cuisine in Kashmir, it is considered a delicacy and eaten by Kashmiri Pandits who would not normally eat chicken. The migratory bird looks like a duck but can fly with great speed. It comes to wetlands of Kashmir during winter. It is deep fried and cooked with hot spices. The meat under the feathers is tough, but regarded by some as tasty and warming.
- Batook Palak, duck with spinach.
- Batook Ta Zamut Dodh, duck in a curd curry.
- Gogji Ta Batook, duck with turnip, cooked through the slow-cooking method known as dum. It is winter comfort food in Kashmir.
- Shikar Rogan Josh, Roghan Josh of hunted game birds and animals such as mallard, geese, plover, snipe, rail, teal, quail, pintail, Wigeon, grouse, partridge, pheasant, spotted deer, hangal, antelope, wild goat etc.
- Shikar Ta Nadeir, meat of game birds cooked with lotus roots.
- Shikar Ta Haand, ducks and mallards prepared with dried dandelion.

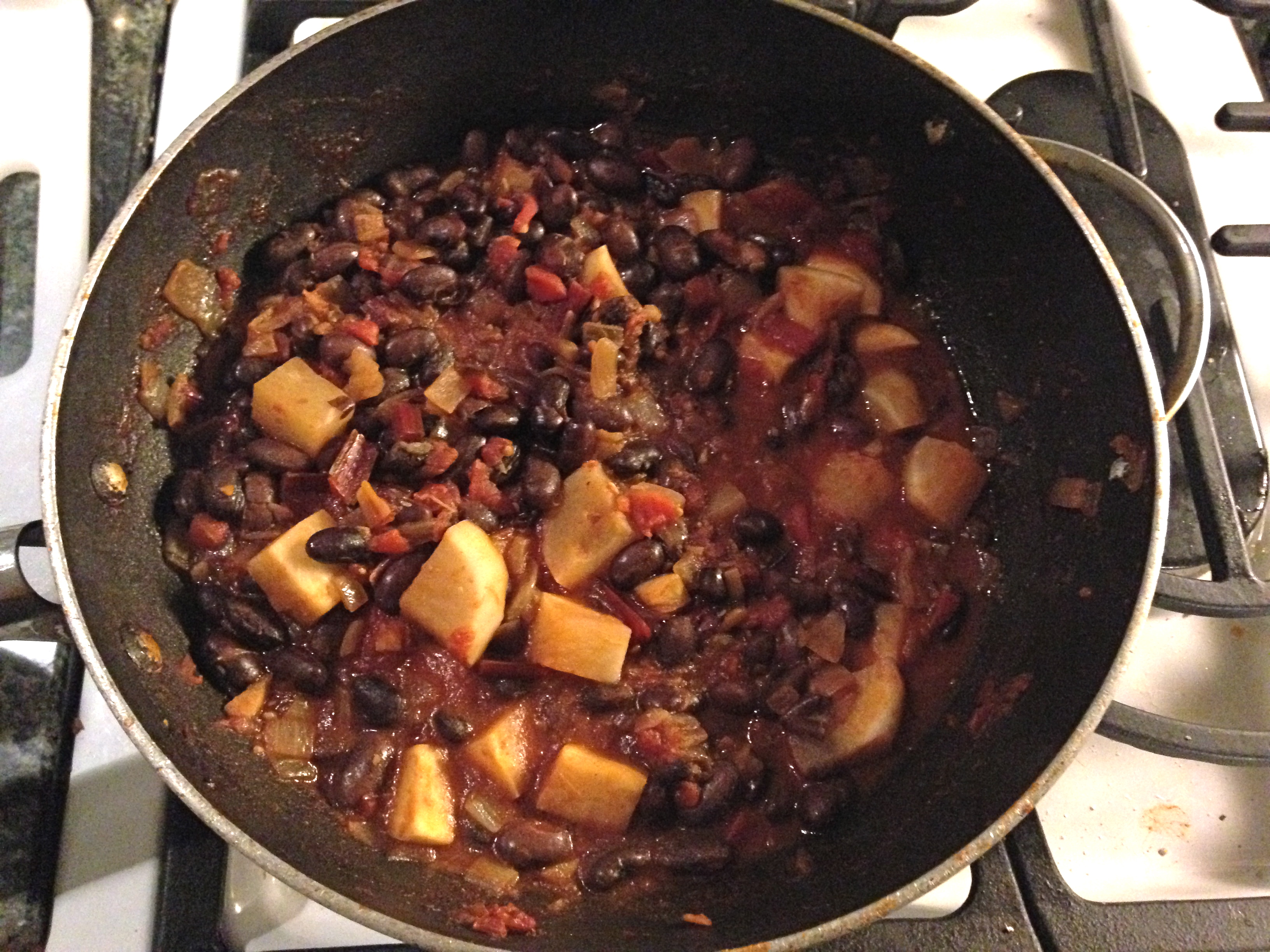
Razmah Gogjee, red kidney beans with sweet turnips.

== Dals ==
Kashmiri Pandits who were vegetarian and did not even eat onions and tomatoes were known as Dal Battas (Dal Pandits):

- Dal Nadur, Lotus stem boiled with green beans to make a dal.
- Vaari Muth Dal, Black Turtle Beans (Kashmiri Vaari Muth).
- Vaari Muth Gogjee, black turtle beans cooked with turnips.
- Razmah Shab Deg, vegetarian variant of the traditional pot preparation, with kidney beans added instead of meat.
- Razmah Dal, a red kidney bean stew with classic Kashmiri spice flavours of powdered ginger and fennel.
- Razma gogji, Kidney beans cooked with turnips.
- Gogji aare ta Razmah, turnip circles are slow simmered with creamy rajma dal flavoured with ground ginger and fennel seeds over a gentle flame.
- Razmah Hemb, Various green beans cooked with tender pods.
- Dal Dabbi, Traditional lentil preparation cooked in milk with spices.
- Channe Baegle, Native to the valley of Kashmir, the dried baegle dal is consumed more in winters.
- Razmah Nadur
- Thool Razmah Yakhean, green kidney beans in yoghurt.
- Vangun Hachi Ta Moonge Dal, Dried brinjals with moong.

== Fermented foods ==
Various varieties of Kashmiri pickles are:

- Aanchar, pickles (chicken, mutton, fish, greylag goose, mango, cherry, bitter gourd, amla, apple, apricot, plum, garlic, turnip, chillies, knol-khols, radishes, carrots, onions, cauliflowers, brinjals, lotus roots, green almonds, hard pears, grapes).

== Street food ==
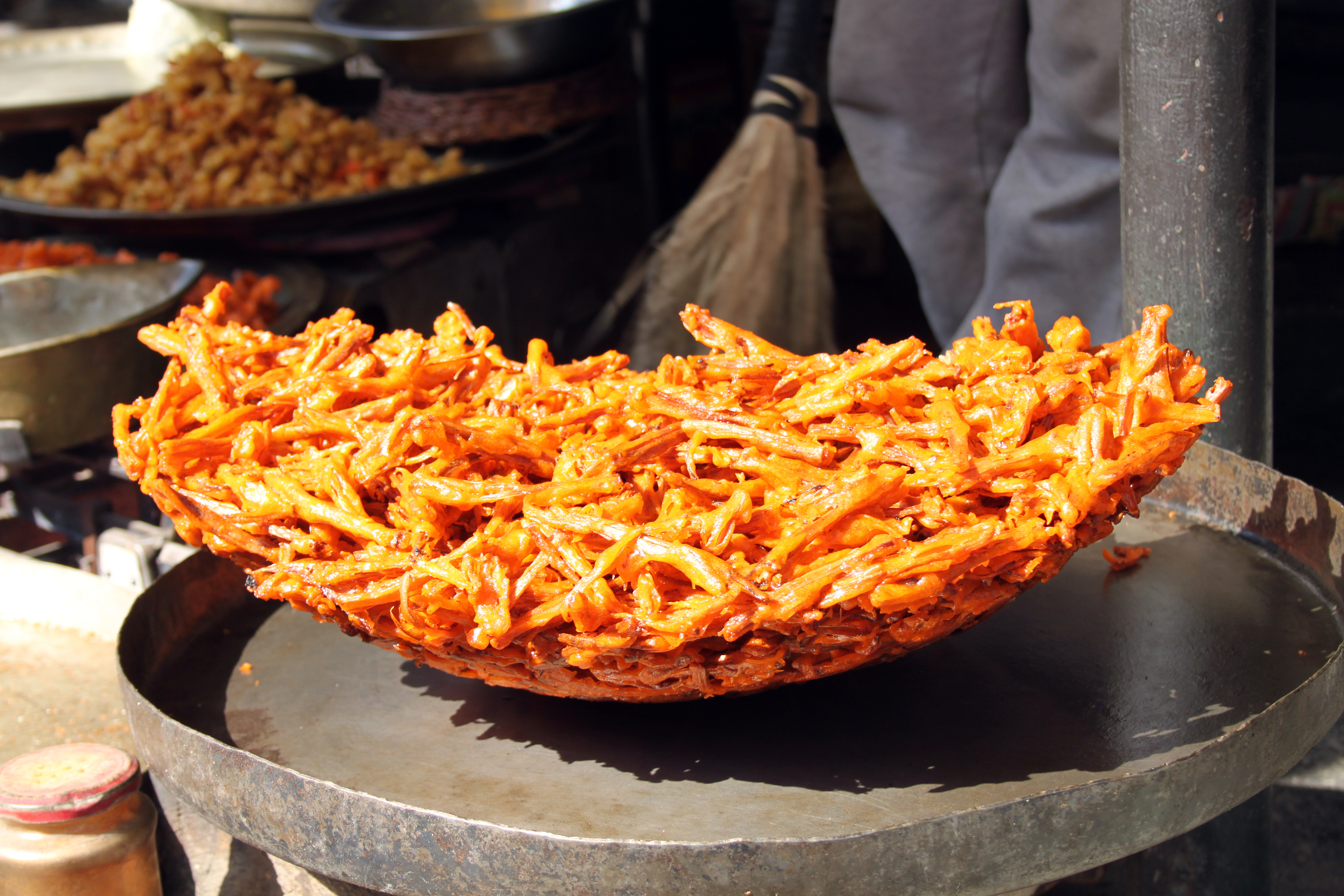
Nadur maunj (lotus stem fritters).

- Makai Waet, roasted corn.
- Buzith Gaer, roasted water chestnuts. Excursionists sit around a hot roasted small heap of nuts and with the help of two stones, one big and the other small, pound these one by one and extract the kernels.
- Monje Guel, fritters of water chestnut kernels. Also called mesa or gaer guel in Kashmiri.
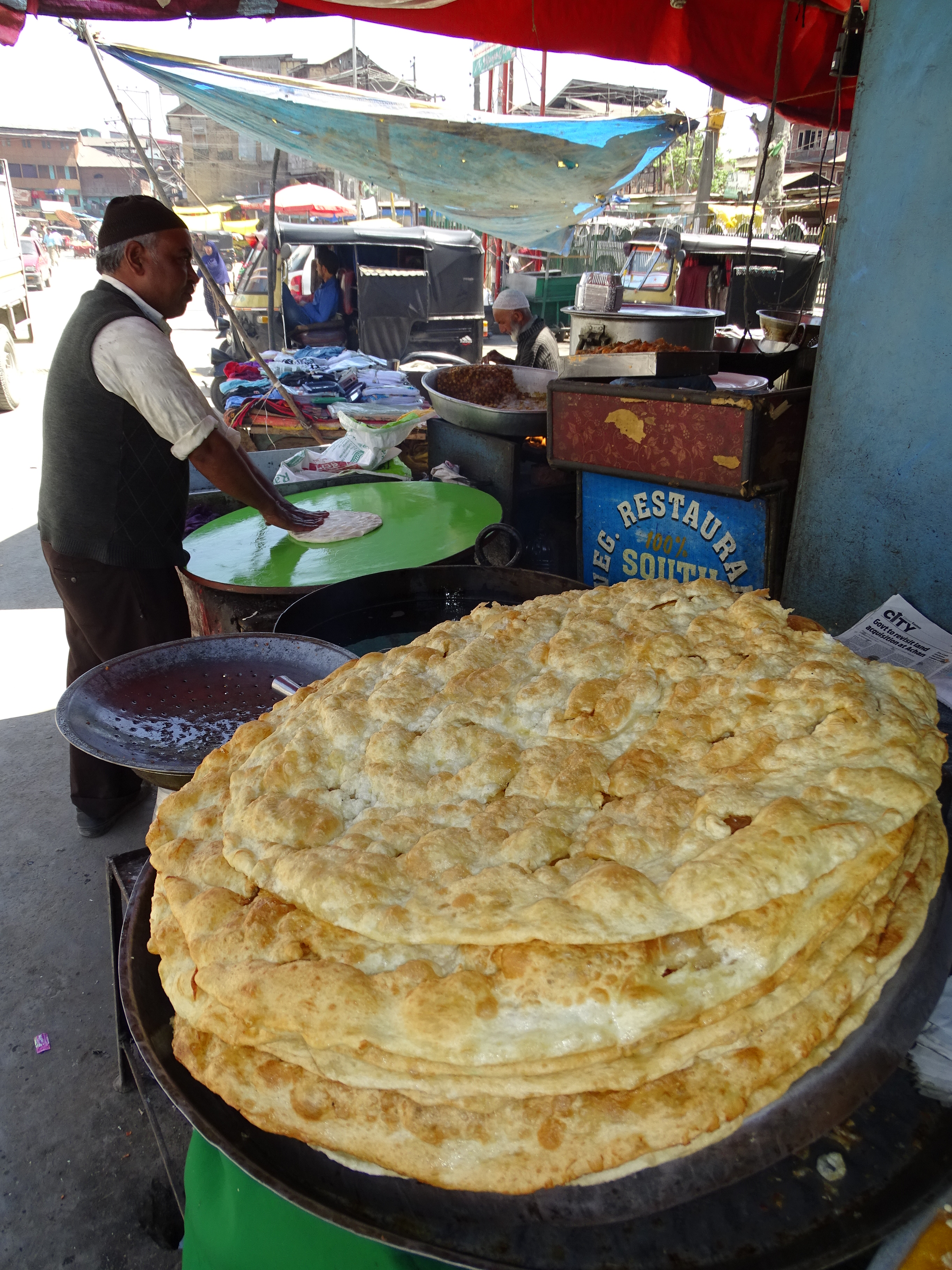
- Puer (pooris), giant breads.
  Nadur Maunj, sliced lotus stems marinated in spicy paste and deep fried.
- Tandoori Chicken, Afghani Chicken, Chicken Lemon, varieties of street food at Khayam, Srinagar.
- Deep-fried Kababs.
- Mutton Keema Samosas, Chicken Keema Samosas etc.
- Alla Posh Mond, pumpkin flower fritters.
- Olav Mond/Monjivor, potato patty with ginger.
- Doel Tsetin, chutney in an earthen pot with different vegetables cabbage, onion, mint, etc.
- Tillae Karrae, chickpeas or dried green peas, coated in a batter of flour and deep fried.
- Mongh Masale, steamed black beans are mixed with salt and red chilli powder and served hot.
- Matar, Kashmiri street food.
- Chunth Pakori, crisp slices of batter-coated and fried green apple.
- Vangan Pakori, fried aubergine coated with gram flour.
- Olav Churma, fries.
- Gand ta Palak Pakori, onions and spinach dipped in spiced batter and then deep-fried.
- Kruhun Masale/Dub Maha, a poor man's shawarma, a thin lavas is made of refined flour in which boiled chickpeas are rolled and then dipped in tomato chutney.
- Razmah Masale, rajma with corn.
- Masale Tsot, chickpea masala spread over a lavas (kashmiri naan). The preparation for making masaal begins during the night or early hours of the morning. Then different kinds of chutneys or sauces are prepared. Radish chutney mixed with fresh curd, green chilli, coriander, pepper and salt is served with it and lastly the soft bread is used for wrapping.
- Egg Roll
- Dastar Katlam, famous halwai food.
- Tobruk Halweh Parothe, deep fried poori with halwa.
- Jalgoz, peanuts.

== Cheese ==
The nomadic shepherds of the Kashmir valley, Gujjars and Bakerwals move their herd of dairy cattle and their own settlements up and down the mountains based on changing seasons:

- Maesh Crari or Maesh Craji, described as the mozzarella of Kashmir. The discs are first coated with chilli, turmeric and salt, and then fried in mustard oil until they form a crisp, golden outer layer and the inside stays soft and creamy.
- Kudan, a rare Gujjar goat cheese that looks like paneer but is more crumbly and akin to feta. Kudan is prepared in Bakerwal tents by heating some mustard oil in a pot on fire and then mixing some salt, turmeric and chilli along with the kudan cheese curds. Everything melts together into a golden liquid flecked with red chilli and small nuggets of kudan.

== Desserts ==
Kashmiris are fond of sugar. Common sweetmeats are:

- Halwa, sweetmeat originally made of honey, camel's milk, cashew nuts, and many other ingredients and brought from the Persian Gulf, via Bombay, in saucers to United India in the nineteenth century. Halwa tradition reached Kashmir towards the end of the nineteenth century.
- Chounth Halwa.
- Barfi, a milk-based sweet dish.
- Khatai, a Kashmiri sweet biscuit that crumbles on each bite.
- Khir, rice pudding.
- Phirin, a sweet pudding of condensed milk with soji mixed with dry fruit like raisins, almonds, cashews, and pistachios, sprinkled with rose-water.
- Kong Phirin, saffron flavoured rice pudding garnished with nuts.
- Seemni, vermicelli kheer.
- Shufta, a traditional dessert made with chopped dry fruits, spices like pepper powder, cardamom and more, in sugar syrup, garnished with rose petals.
- Mitha Kanagucchi, morels in syrup.
- Kofta Khumani, mince apricots.
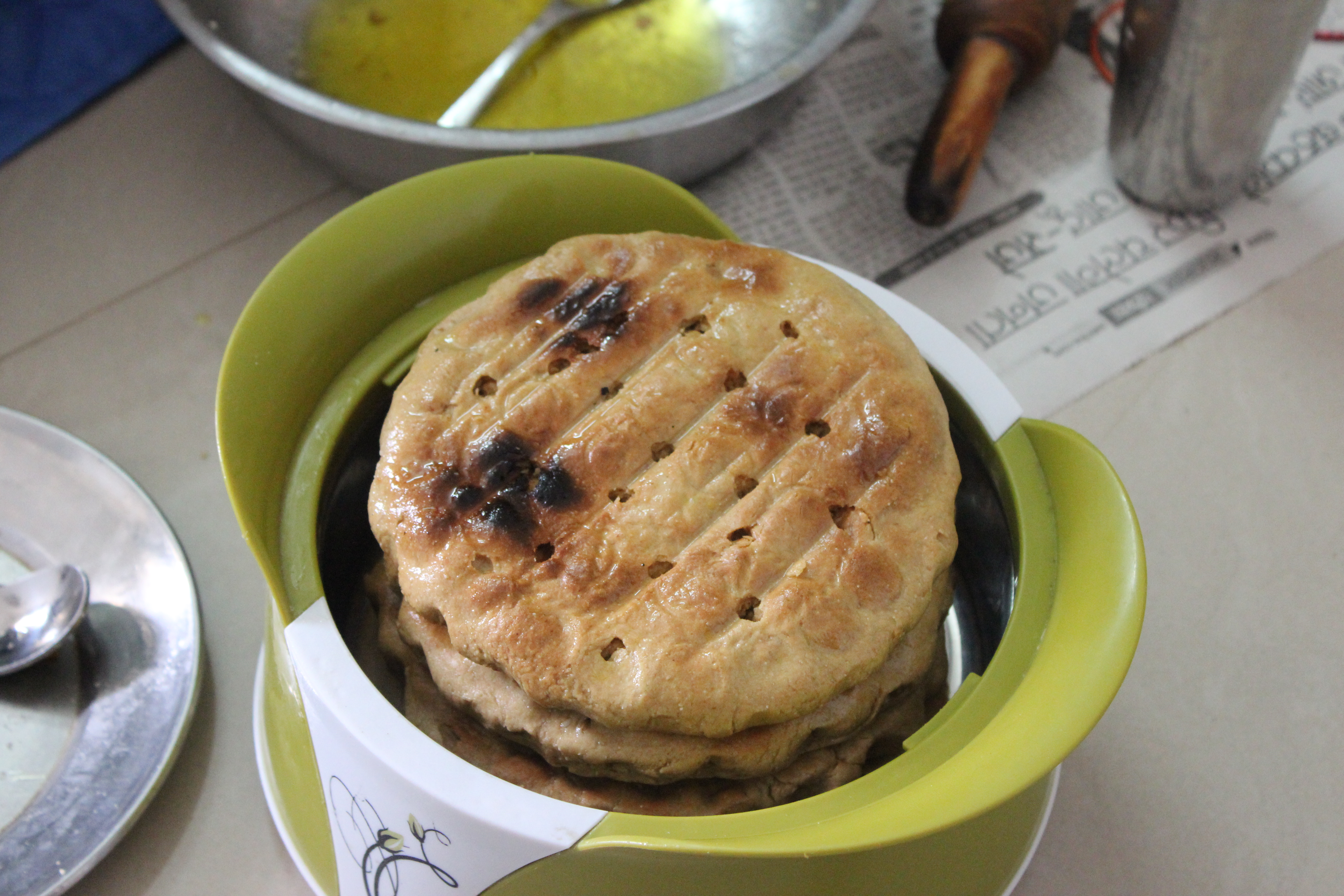
- Kashmiri Roth.
  Roth, something between a cake and a bread, these sweet rotis made with flour, ghee, yoghurt, poppy seeds, eggs (on special occasions) and sugar are a domestic favourite. The art of baking a perfect roth is as much an acquired skill as it is a relearned discipline passed down from generations.
- Basrakh, A sweet delicacy made from flour with a touch of ghee.
- Tosha, an age-old Kashmiri dessert.
- Lyde, kashmiri dessert made with whole wheat flour.
- Nabad, sugar crystallised in an earthen pot or a copper container like Naat and then carved out as a solid sugar ball in a semi-round shape, bigger than a football.
- Gulkand, indigenous rose (koshur gulaab) preserved in a sugar base. Non-Kashmiri roses are not used in this formulation. In place of sugar, honey can also be mixed with rose petals.
- Matka Kulfi, kulfi topped with cold noodles.
- Kesar Kulfi.
- Dry Fruit Kulfi.

== English pastry ==
Before 1918, Abdul Ahad Bhat, of Ahdoos, was under the tutelage of English bakers at Nedou's, a hotel in Srinagar owned by Austro-Swiss Michael Nedou. He quickly picked up the art of baking, and started a small bakery, the first by a Kashmiri at that time. Ahdoos's forte was English goodies, and as India inched towards freedom from British Rule he added Kashmiri items to the menu. Mughal Darbar was established on Residency Road in 1984 and on the road parallel is Jee Enn, founded by Ghulam Nabi Sofi in 1972. Many of the owners and staff of these new bakeries have trained in Ahdoos. The variety of pastries include:

- Chicken or Mutton Patty, meat seasoned with salt, pepper and garlic, encased in layered puff pastry.
- Puffs.
- Cream Rolls.
- Cream Buns.
- Coconut Macaroons.
- Walnut Macaroons.
- Walnut Tart, made possible by the easy availability of walnut kernels in Kashmir.
- Walnut Fudge, an exclusivity of Kashmir's Moonlight Bakery, the recipe contains 'snow-white walnuts' from Uri and honey and dates from local market.

== Kandarwan ==
The Kashmir Valley is noted for its bakery tradition, that of the qKndarwan. Nowhere else in the Indian subcontinent can be found such a huge variety of leavened breads, another pointer to the Central Asian influence on Kashmiris' food habits. On the Dal Lake in Kashmir or in downtown Srinagar, bakery shops are elaborately laid out. Bakers sell various kinds of breads with golden brown crusts topped with sesame and poppy seeds.

Different kinds of traditional Kashmiri breads include:

- Tsoet and Tsoechvor/Tilvor are crisp and flaky small round breads topped with khaskhash (poppy) and til (sesame) seeds. A local bagel of about three inches diameter and six inches circumference, the upper half is soft and the lower crust is crispy. It is the evening/afternoon bread.
- Sheermal, a saffron flavoured traditional flatbread said to have originated in Iran. It is offered in both sweet and flavourful versions. The sheermal bread is usually dented with multiple patterns bordering on corresponding lines.
- Baqerkhayn (puff pastry), Kashmiri bakerkhani has a special place in Kashmiri cuisine. It is similar to a round naan in appearance, but crisp and layered, and sprinkled with sesame seeds. It is typically consumed hot during breakfast.
- Lavasa, thin unleavened flat bread, white in colour, made of maida (finely-milled wheat flour). It is a paper-thin blistered naan. Some lavasas are soft while others are crispy.
- Girda, made with dough that has been fermented overnight, rolls of dough are flattened out by hand and finger impressions are pressed into it to give you lines that run down its length. Girda and lavas are served with butter.
- Kulcha, baked exclusively with ghee, this small, hard, dry, crumbly bread, is usually round in shape. It is decorated by placing a peanut in the centre of the upper face.
- Roth khabar, a cake-like sweet bread made in traditional tandoor and covered with dry fruits.

== Wazwan ==
Wazwan (Kashmiri pronunciation: [ʋaːzɨʋaːn]) is a multi-course meal in Kashmiri cuisine, originating from Kashmir.

Almost all the dishes are meat-based using lamb, beef or mutton with few vegetarian dishes. It is popular throughout the larger Kashmir region. Moreover, Wazwan is also served internationally at Kashmiri food festivals and reunions. All dishes are prepared according to halal standards. For vegetarians, there are distinctive delicacies such as Dum Alve, Nadur (lotus stem), Haakh (collard greens). Kashmiri vegetarian pulao is often included - a flavorful dish prepared with aromatic Kashmiri spices, vegetables, and a mix of dried fruits.
