= Shab deg =

Indian dish

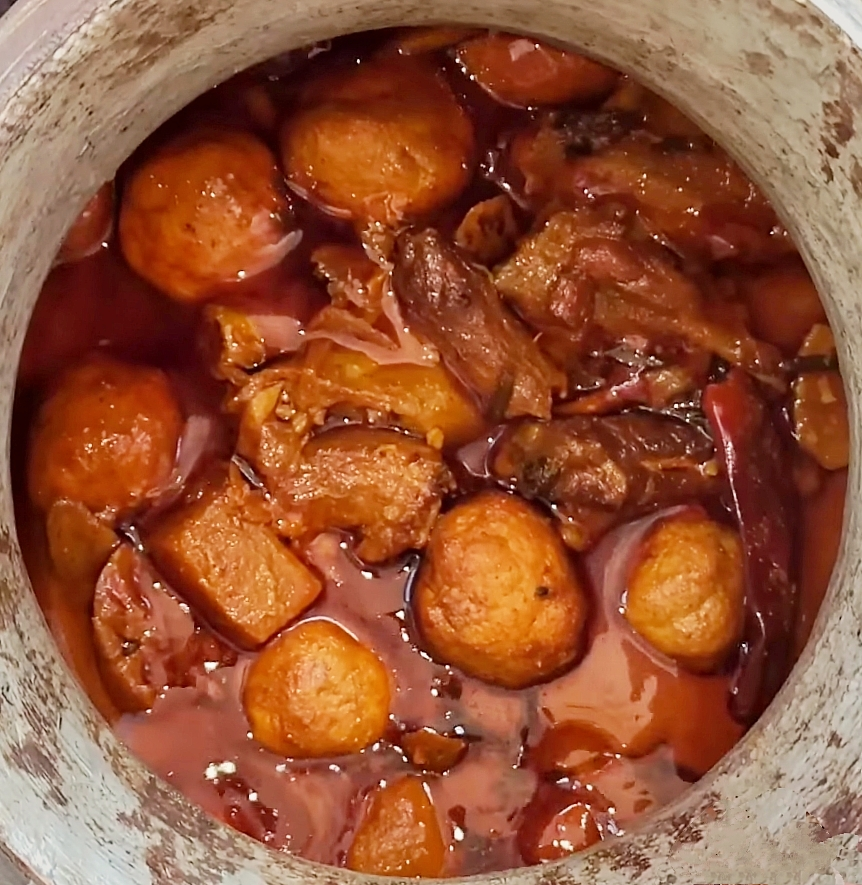
- Shab deg
- Alternative names: Shab daig
- Place of origin: India
- Region or state: Jammu & Kashmir
- Associated cuisine: Indian
- Serving temperature: Hot
- Main ingredients: Mutton, turnip

Shab deg or shab daig (Kashmiri pronunciation: [ʃab d̪eːɡ]) is an Indian slow-cooked turnip and mutton stew, traditionally left to simmer overnight. "Shab" means 'night' and "daig" means 'cooking pot' in the Persian language. The dish has been described as Mughlai in origin from the Kashmir Valley of Jammu and Kashmir, India.
