= Tuji =

Street food in Kashmir

Tuj
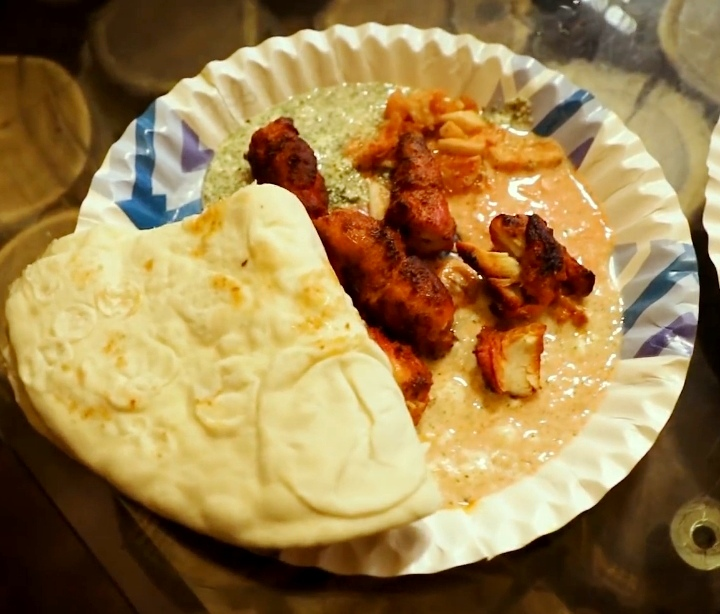
- Tuji
- Alternative names: Seekh Tuj
- Place of origin: Kashmir
- Region or state: Kashmir
- Serving temperature: Hot
- Main ingredients: Meat spices

Tuji (Kashmiri pronunciation: [t̪ud͡ʒi]) or Tuj (Kashmiri pronunciation: [t̪ud͡ʒ]) (singular of tuji), also called Seekh Tuj (Kashmiri pronunciation: [siːxɨ t̪ud͡ʒ]) is a popular street food in Kashmir made from meat, typically mutton or fish, known for its flavorful and smoky taste, often served with various chutneys and dips.

== Serving and Accompaniments ==
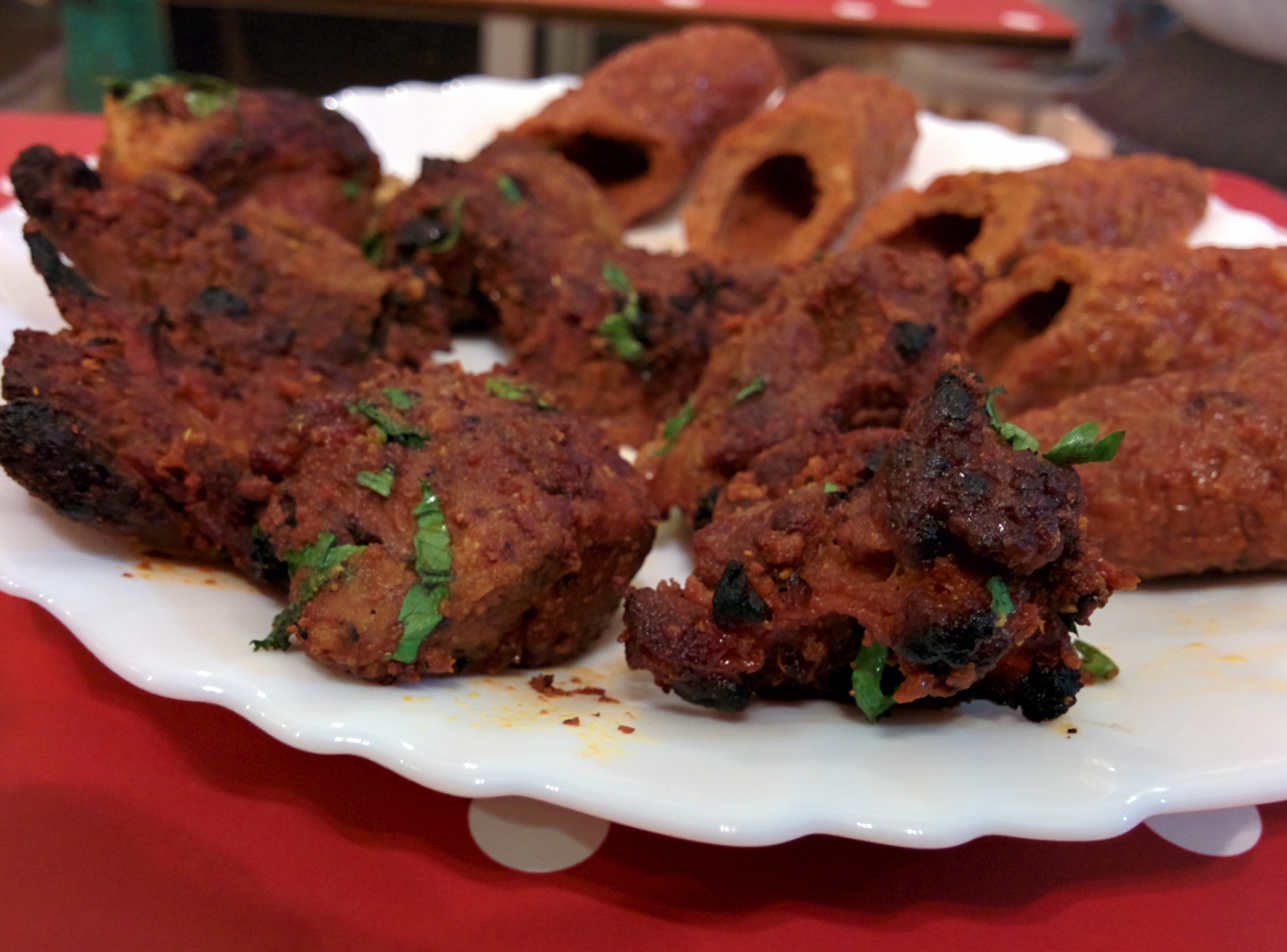
Tuji and Kababs.

Tuj is typically served hot, garnished with fresh coriander or mint leaves. It pairs well with Kashmiri lavasa (a type of flatbread). A side of yogurt or a simple salad can complement the dish, balancing its rich and spicy flavors.

== See also ==
- Rogan Josh – A famous Kashmiri meat curry.
- Goshtaba – A traditional Kashmiri meatball dish.
- Kashmiri cuisine – The broader culinary tradition of Kashmir.
