= Nandita P. Palshetkar =

Indian gynaecologist and medical doctor

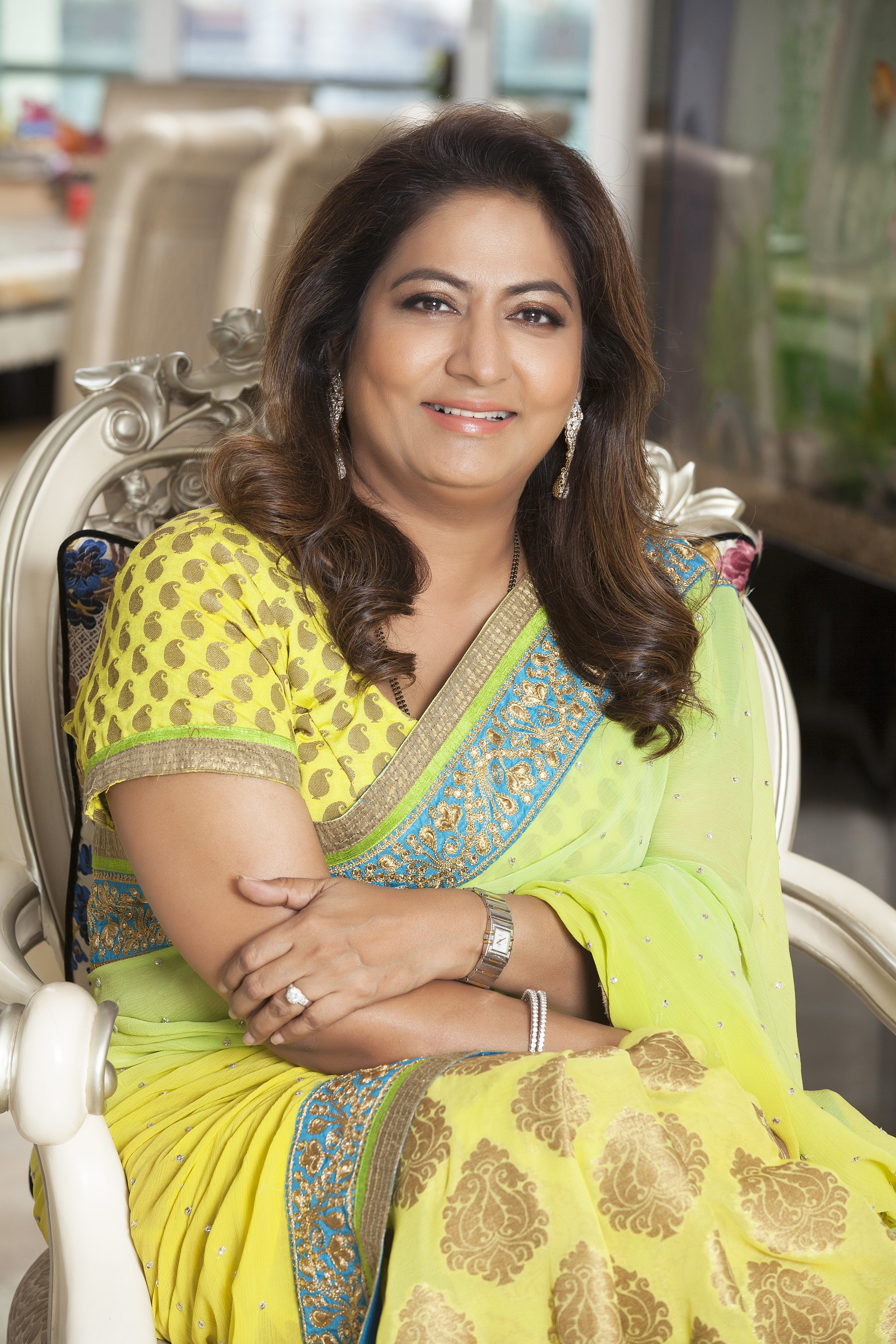
- Palshetkar in Mumbai, 2016
- Born: 30 October 1963 (age 62); Mumbai, Maharashtra, India
- Education: MBBS, MD, FCPS, FICOG
- Occupation: Medical Director,
- Known for: IVF & Infertility, President FOGSI, Award Winning Gynecologist in Mumbai, International Federation of Gynaecology and Obstetrics
- Father: D. Y. Patil
- Relatives: Satej Patil; Ajeenkya Patil
- Medical career
- Sub-specialties: IVF & Infertility, Assisted Reproductive Techniques
- Website: https://www.nanditapalshetkar.com/

Nandita P. Palshetkar is an Indian Gynecologist who specializes in in vitro fertilisation and infertility. She is the elected president of Federation of Obstetric and Gynaecological Societies of India, in 2019. She is also the first vice president of Federation of Obstetric and Gynaecological Societies of India.

Palshetkar is the scientific director and head of the Bloom IVF UNIT at Lilavati Hospital and Research Centre, Mumbai.

== Early life and education ==
Nandita was born to Patil family in 1963. Her father D. Y. Patil was the governor of Bihar, West Bengal and Tripura from Nationalist Congress Party. He was also the recipient of India's 4th highest civillian award Padma Shri.

Palshetkar did her schooling from Hill Grange High School, Mumbai. She was A grade student and her keen interest in athletics and won the best athlete award at the school. She did her MBBS and MD from Grant Medical College, Mumbai. After her post graduation she further specialized in IVF & Micro-manipulation and PGD from the University of Ghent, Belgium, Alpha School of Embryology Naples, OVERIAN TISSUE FREEZING Copenhagen, Denmark.

== Career ==
=== Medical faculty ===
Dr Palshetkar is the faculty in Obstetrics & Gynecology at D.Y. Patil Medical College, Navi Mumbai, Teacher for Super Specialty Degree (FNB), Fellowship in Reproductive Medicine, National Board, Delhi at Lilavati Hospital, Mumbai.

She is also on the Editorial Board of the journal “Advanced Emergency Medicine”, Universe Scientific Publishing Pte. Ltd, Singapore.

=== Bloom IVF ===
Palshetkar is the in vitro fertilisation and infertility director at eleven Bloom IVF centers in India, including Fortis Bloom IVF Centers (New Delhi, Gurgaon, Chandigarh, and Mumbai), Lilavati Hospital and Research Centre Mumbai, PalshetkarPatil Nursing Home Mumbai, D.Y. Patil Medical College, and Sakra World Hospital Bangalore. Palshetkar is also the President of the Indian Society For Assisted Reproduction, and the medical director of Lilavati Hospital Bloom IVF Centre, Mumbai.

Palshetkar is an invited speaker and faculty since 1994 on various events, hospitals and medical institutions in India.

=== Research & development ===
Palshetkar researched on various topics of IVF & Infertility during her specialization. Her research includes Embryo transfer.

Along with Infertility, Dr Palshetkar has managed high risk pregnancies like PIH (Pregnancy Induced Hypertension), GDM (Gestational Diabetes Mellitus), Hypothyroidism, IUGR (Intra Uterine growth Restriction), Low birth weight babies, Cervical Incompetence.

== Legal challenges ==
In July 2017, Palshetkar was among the doctors whose plea was heard by the Supreme Court of India regarding the legal limit for medical termination of pregnancy. The case highlighted the challenges faced by women seeking abortions beyond the then-permitted limit of 20 weeks under the Medical Termination of Pregnancy Act. The legal proceedings contributed to the broader discussion that ultimately led to an amendment increasing the permissible gestational limit for certain categories of pregnancies from 20 weeks to 24 weeks.

== Philanthropy ==
Palshetkar supported the She’s Ambassador programme 2017, a PVR Nest initiative which was designed to develop leadership skills and increase health awareness among girls. The program has inspired over 50,000 girls from 50 schools across Mumbai to bring change within themselves and their communities and act as "Health Ambassadors" for others.

Palshetkar won the "Bharat Gaurav Award" in 2014, at the House of Commons, the Times Network National Award for Outstanding Contribution to Healthcare in 2017, and the Golden Globe Tigers Award, Malaysia, also in 2017.

In 2021, Fellowship honoris causa was awarded to Palshetkar for her achievement and support in the development of women's healthcare services at the United Kingdom's Royal College of Obstetricians and Gynaecologists.

Palshetkar has contributed in the 'Pradhan Mantri Surakshit Matritva Abhiyan' launched by the Ministry of Health and Family Welfare (MoHFW), Government of India to provide fixed day assured, comprehensive and quality antenatal care to pregnant women on 9th of every month.

Palshetkar has become the member of International Federation of Gynaecology and Obstetrics in 2025.

She has also worked at Sir H. N. Reliance Foundation Hospital, Mumbai.

== Books and publications ==
- "FOGSI Focus: Use of Adjuvants in Infertility", series editor: Nandita Palshetkar, JP Medical, 2021, ISBN 978-93-89587-97-5
- "Oocyte Cryopreservation - Current Scenario and Future Perspectives: A Narrative Review", 2021, Hrishikesh D Pai,1 Rashmi Baid,1 Nandita P Palshetkar,1 Arnav Pai,2 Rishma D Pai
- "Hysteroscopic metroplasty in women with primary infertility and septate uterus: reproductive performance after surgery", Dalal RJ1, Pai HD, Palshetkar NP, Takhtani M, Pai RD, Saxena N, 2012
- 'Cervical cancer: Early detection, awareness generation the need of hour', 2025, The Economic Times.
- 'Tackling The Surge Of India's Silent Crisis: Anaemia Among Adolescent Girls', 2025, Businessworld.

== Awards ==
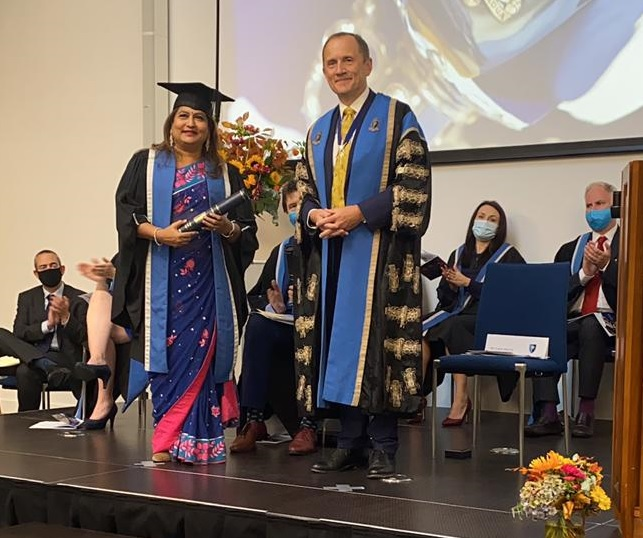
Dr. Nandita Palshetkar at Membership Ceremony, London on 16 September 2021

- Prabha Malhotra Memorial Lifetime Achievement Award by the Indian society for Assisted Reproduction (ISAR) in March 2026.
- Sarvottam Naari Samman Awards 2026
- National Fertility Award 2025
- September 2019, Fellowship honoris causa from RCOG for achievement in the development of women's healthcare at London
- 5th World Women Leadrship Congress & Awards 2018 for “Women Super Achiever Award”
- The Golden Globe Tigers Award 2017 for Outstanding Contribution in Healthcare - Fertility & IVF in Malaysia, 2017
- Bharat Gaurav Award 2014 at House of Commons, London
- Gr8 Women's Achievers Award in Medical & Health Care 2011
- Best woman achiever in gynecology held by MAYOR OF Mumbai Shraddha Jadhav in 2010
