= Knowledge crystal =

This page is about information objects. For the university library, see University of Indonesia#Campuses.

Knowledge crystals are web-based information objects that are used in scientific information production. Especially, they are used in open assessments designed to support societal decisions. They act as current best answers to specific research questions. They are produced and distributed openly using crowdsourcing and scientific criticism.

== Definition and principles ==
Knowledge crystals are web-based information objects (in practice, web pages with a specific topic) that are used in scientific information production. They were first described in a report by National Public Health Institute of Finland in 2007, at that time using name variable and later ovariable (from open variable). The term knowledge crystal was first used in a review article about big data not earlier than in 2015.

The purpose of a knowledge crystal is to provide best current scientifically defendable answer or answers to a specific research question and also give enough rationale to convince a critical rational observer that the answers are plausible. This gives knowledge crystals their particular structure: question, answer, and rationale. To promote the use of answers in decision support and elsewhere, they are by default published as open data. Especially, they are used in open assessments designed to support societal decisions. They are produced and distributed openly using crowdsourcing and scientific criticism. In disputes, arguments that are based on direct observations and data are the strongest.

The open participation in knowledge crystal production is inspired by the criteria for evaluating implementation of the Aarhus Convention principles by Hartley and Wood, and particularly the seven categories of principles of public participation by Webler and Tuler.

Rather than consensus, knowledge crystals aim to produce shared understanding, where all relevant views and facts are described in such a detail that participants can see where there are agreements and where disagreements and why. It is also essential that scientifically falsified views do not affect the answer but that they are shown in the rationale to avoid repetition of previous mistakes. This is an essential part of a decision support approach called open policy practice, where information is structured specifically by using knowledge crystals.

== Usage ==
Knowledge crystals are extensively used in Opasnet, a web-workspace for making open assessments to support societal decisions. The method was initially developed to promote environmental health assessments, but it was deliberately expanded to cover health impact assessments and other areas of decision support. Knowledge crystals are also used in Climate Watch, a monitoring platform for city-level climate mitigation.

There are different kinds of knowledge crystals. Assessments are produced to answer practical information needs related to actual decisions to be made. They consist of variables, which contain answers to related scientific questions such as health impacts of planned decision actions. There are also methods, which give specific guidance on how to produce a particular kind of variable, e.g. a disease burden estimate. Typically, knowledge crystals are continually updated when new information arises. However, assessments are usually closed when the decision has been made, but the variables that the assessments used are kept open and used in subsequent assessments.

The standardised structure of knowledge crystals enables the building of assessment models or different Internet applications on top of them. This is based on the idea that even though the content is updated, a knowledge crystal remains in the same, computer-readable format with a permanent URL. A specific feature is also that an understandable summary, technical details and metadata for an expert, possible discussions, and open data are all found from the same page.

== Criticism ==
The main criticism by researchers has been that collaborating online will take time away from the real work, namely publishing scientific articles about original research. Also, doubts have been presented whether it would be possible to manage a scientifically high-quality process if anyone could participate, even those who have vested interest in the topic.

== See also ==
- Opasnet
- Open assessment
- Climate Watch
- Knowledge Engine (Wikimedia Foundation)
- Question answering
- Probabilistic logic
- Probabilistic logic network
- Dempster–Shafer theory
