= Huttunen =

Huttunen is a Finnish surname. Notable people with the surname include:

- Pekka Huttunen (1871–1932), Finnish tenant farmer and politician
- Heikki Huttunen (1880–1947), Finnish sport shooter
- Evert Huttunen (1884–1924), Finnish journalist and politician
- Erkki Huttunen (1901–1956), Finnish architect
- Olli Huttunen (biathlete) (1915–1940), Finnish military patrol skier
- Eevi Huttunen (1922–2015), Finnish speed skater
- Jussi Huttunen (born 1941), Finnish physician, professor and scientist
- Olli Huttunen (born 1960), Finnish football goalkeeper and manager
- Hanna Huttunen (born 1969), Finnish politician
- Toni Huttunen (born 1973), Finnish footballer
- Miika Huttunen, Finnish video game critic
- Jari Huttunen (born 1994), Finnish rally driver
