= Pekka Puska =

Finnish physician and politician

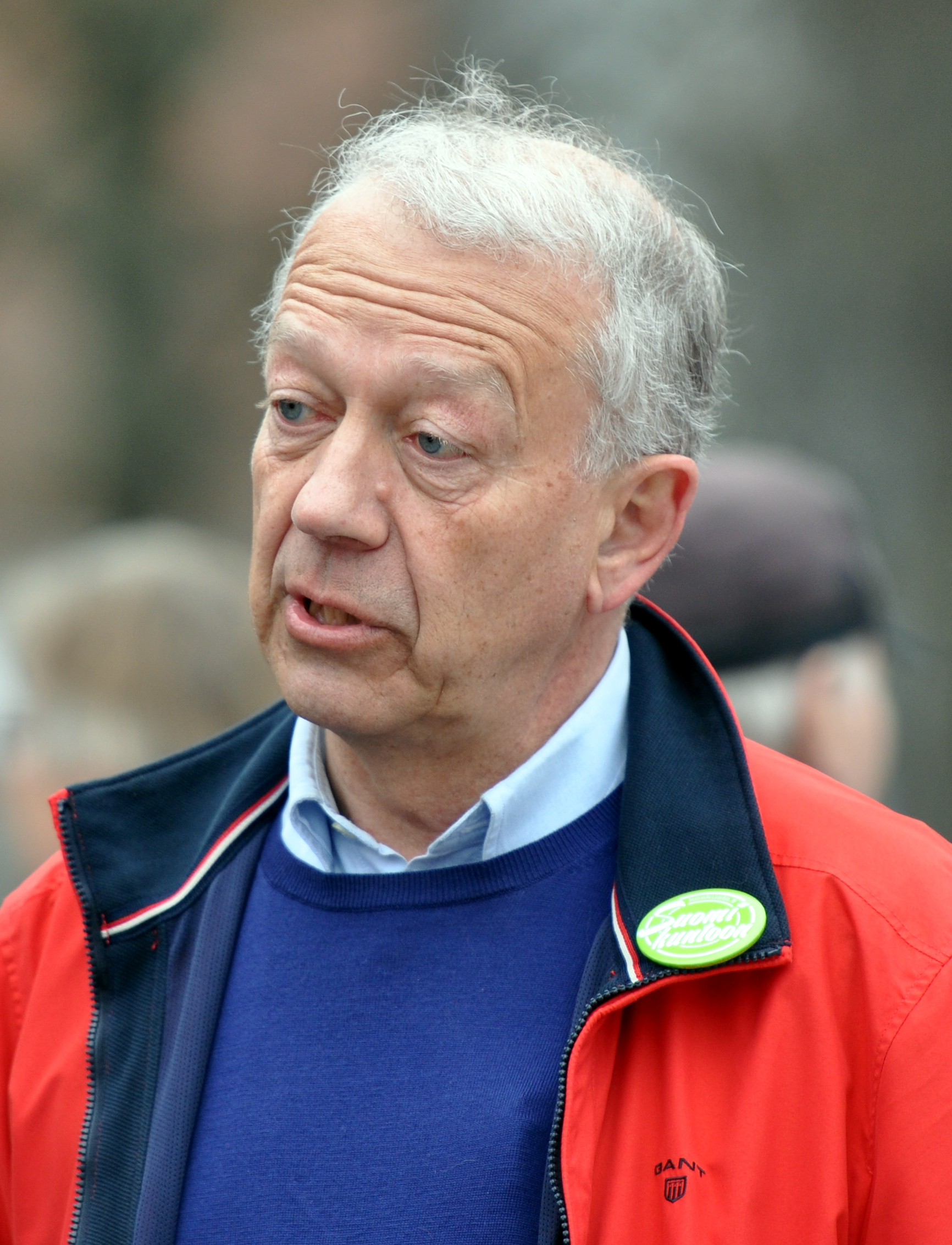
Pekka Puska is a Finnish doctor and politician.

Pekka Puska (born 18 December 1945 in Vaasa) is a Finnish physician, docent and politician. Puska held the position of Director General of the National Institute for Health and Welfare (THL), Finland in 2009–2013. THL was formed following the merging of National Public Health Institute of Finland (KTL), and the National Research and Development Centre for Welfare and Health (STAKES). Puska headed KTL from 2003 to 2009. Puska is a Member of Parliament (Eduskunta) since 2017 and was previously a Member of Parliament in 1987–1991. Puska is a Docent for University of Helsinki and University of Eastern Finland.

Puska is considered to have had a significant influence on Finnish public health research and practice for several decades. He spearheaded the North Karelia Project (as Director and Principal Investigator) for preventing cardiovascular disease 1972–1977, during which time cardiovascular disease mortality amongst men fell by 80 per cent. Puska worked as a director for NCD prevention and health promotion at the World Health Organization (WHO) Headquarters in 2001–2003. In 2006 he was the Finnish candidate for the Director-General post of WHO. From 2010 to 2013 he was Chancellor of the University of Turku. He also currently holds the position of President of World Heart Federation (WHF) and that of vice-president of the International Association of Public Health Institutes (IANPHI).
