= Anu Wartiovaara =

Finnish professor of molecular medicine

Professor Anu Wartiovaara
- Born: Anu Elina Suomalainen; 1966 (age 59–60)
- Education: University of Helsinki
- Scientific career
- Workplaces: University of Helsinki
- Thesis: Mutations of mitochondrial DNA in human disease (1993)

Anu Wartiovaara (née Suomalainen; born 1966) is a Finnish neuroscience and biomedical researcher, holding the Sigrid Jusélius Professorship of clinical molecular medicine at the University of Helsinki, specialising in mitochondrial disorders.

She has also been appointed as an Academy Professor of the Research Council of Finland since 2017.

In 2007, Wartiovaara was elected as a member of the Finnish Academy of Science and Letters.

In 2013, she was elected as member of the European Molecular Biology Organization EMBO.

In 2021, the Finnish Medical Society Duodecim awarded Wartiovaara the Matti Äyräpää Prize for her work on mitochondrial diseases.

In 2022, she was elected Member of the Academia Europaea.

She gained an MD and PhD from the University of Helsinki, with postdoctoral research at the National Public Health Institute of Finland and McGill University of Canada.

Some of Wartiovaara's publications have appeared under her maiden name Suomalainen, or Suomalainen-Wartiovaara.
