= Jaakko Tuomilehto =

Finnish epidemiologist and public health researcher

- Born: Finland
- Education: University of Turku (MD, 1973; MA, 1975); University of Kuopio (PhD, 1975)
- Known for: Finnish Diabetes Prevention Study; FINDRISC risk score North Karelia Project; WHO DIAMOND Project
- Awards: Kelly West Award (ADA, 1998); Claude Bernard Award (EASD); Camillo Golgi Award (EASD); Geoffrey Rose Award (ESC); Harold Rifkin Award (ADA)
- Scientific career
- Fields: Epidemiology, Public health, Diabetology
- Workplaces: University of Helsinki; Dasman Diabetes Institute, Kuwait; THL, Finland
- Website: researchportal.helsinki.fi/en/persons/jaakko-tuomilehto

Jaakko Tuomilehto is a Finnish physician and epidemiologist specialising in public health, diabetes, cardiovascular disease, and lifestyle. He is Professor Emeritus of Public Health at the University of Helsinki. He is widely recognised for initiating the Finnish Diabetes Prevention Study (DPS), which demonstrated that lifestyle intervention can reduce the incidence of type 2 diabetes by 58% in high-risk individuals.

== Education ==
Tuomilehto received his MD from the University of Turku, Finland, in 1973. He subsequently earned a Master of Arts in sociology, statistics, and psychology from the same institution in 1975, and completed his PhD in Epidemiology and Community Medicine at the University of Kuopio, Finland, also in 1975.

== Career ==
=== Academic and institutional positions ===
Tuomilehto has held positions at several institutions throughout his career. He served as Professor of Public Health at the University of Helsinki, where he is now Professor Emeritus. He has been affiliated with the Diabetes and Genetic Epidemiology Unit of the National Institute for Health and Welfare (THL) in Helsinki. He was working as the Medical Officer for Cardiovascular and Metabolic Diseases at the World Health Oranisation. He also held a professorship at Danube University Krems, Austria, and has been associated with King Abdulaziz University in Jeddah, Saudi Arabia, and the National School of Public Health in Madrid, Spain. He has served as Chief Scientific Officer at the Dasman Diabetes Institute in Kuwait.

He supervises doctoral programmes in Biomedicine and Population Health at the University of Helsinki, and has supervised more than 130 PhD theses.

=== North Karelia Project ===
Early in his career, Tuomilehto contributed as a researcher and Principal Investigator to the North Karelia Project, launched in 1972 in North Karelia, Finland — the world's first community-based programme for the prevention of cardiovascular disease mortality. The project addressed key risk factors including smoking, serum cholesterol, and blood pressure, and was later expanded nationally. Between 1972 and 2012, cardiovascular disease mortality for working-age men and women in Finland declined by over 80%.

=== Finnish Diabetes Prevention Study ===
Tuomilehto initiated the Finnish Diabetes Prevention Study (DPS), a landmark randomised controlled trial demonstrating that intensive lifestyle intervention — targeting weight reduction, dietary changes, and increased physical activity — reduced the incidence of type 2 diabetes by 58% among adults with impaired glucose tolerance. The study's findings, published in the New England Journal of Medicine in 2001, were subsequently confirmed by similar trials in the United States, the United Kingdom, the Netherlands, Japan, China, and India. The experiences gained from the DPS contributed to the design and implementation of the first national diabetes prevention programme in Finland where he served as the Chair of the planning committee.

=== FINDRISC ===
Tuomilehto contributed to the development of FINDRISC (FINnish Diabetes RIsk SCore), a non-laboratory screening tool for estimating an individual's risk of developing type 2 diabetes within ten years. FINDRISC has been validated and widely adopted across Europe and beyond. FINDRISC is the most commonly used diabetes risk score globally.

=== WHO DIAMOND Project ===
Tuomilehto served as Principal Investigator of the WHO DIAMOND Project, which mapped the worldwide incidence of childhood type 1 diabetes during the 1990s, encompassing data from more than 100 countries. He showed that Finland has the highest incidence of childhood-onset type 1 diabetes in the world. He has carried out numerous studies on epidemiology, genetics and complications of type 1 diabetes

=== FINMONICA, DECODE, DECODA, and FUSION ===
He was involved in several major international epidemiological studies, including FINMONICA (the Finnish component of the WHO MONICA Project) and served as the Chief of the MONICA Data Centre located in Helsinki, the DECODE and DECODA studies (Diabetes Epidemiology: Collaborative Analysis of Diagnostic Criteria in Europe and Asia), and the FUSION (Finland United States Investigation of Non-insulin dependent diabetes) study on the genetics of type 2 diabetes and associated conditions, conducted in collaboration with the National Institutes of Health and several US universities.

=== FINGER trial ===
Tuomilehto contributed to research into the aetiology of dementia and Alzheimer's disease, which showed that cardiovascular risk factors and unhealthy lifestyle habits predict dementia risk. This work informed the design of the FINGER (FINnish GERiatric Intervention Study to Prevent Cognitive Impairment and Disability) trial, a multidomain lifestyle intervention study that reported positive results in preventing cognitive decline.

== Research impact ==
Tuomilehto's research spans the epidemiology and prevention of non-communicable diseases, including diabetes, cardiovascular disease, cancer, and dementia. He has been involved in epidemiological studies across Europe, China, India, Japan, Pacific Islands, Latin America, the Middle East, the United States, and Mauritius.

As of 2026, he has authored or co-authored more than 1,735 original peer-reviewed publications and 346 reviews, editorials and book chapters in English, 157 scientific articles in Finnish, and edited 24 books or special journal issues. He holds a D-index of 263 with over 349,000 citations, ranking him first nationally in Finland and number 19 globally in Medicine. He has served as editor-in-chief of the journal Primary Care Diabetes and as an editorial board member of numerous scientific journals.

He has been a Steering Committee Member in more than 40 international collaborative studies and research programmes, and has participated as faculty or organising committee member in more than 80 international postgraduate courses, seminars, and scientific conferences.

== Awards and honours ==
Tuomilehto has received numerous national and international scientific awards, including:

- Kelly West Award, American Diabetes Association (1998)
- Harold Rifkin Award, American Diabetes Association
- Claude Bernard Award, European Association for the Study of Diabetes (EASD)
- Camillo Golgi Award, EASD
- Geoffrey Rose Award on Population Sciences, European Society of Cardiology (ESC)
- Fredrick H. Epstein Award and David Kritchevsky Award, American Heart Association (AHA)
- UNESCO–Hellmut Mehnert Award on aetiology and prevention of diabetes
- Hans Chiari Memorial Lecture Award, Austrian Stroke Research Society
- Khwarizmi International Award, Iran
- Great Sheikh Hamdan International Award in Diabetes Research, Dubai
- Folksam Prize in Epidemiological Research, Karolinska Institute, Sweden
- Peter Bennett Diabetes Epidemiology Award, International Diabetes Epidemiology Group
- Bradford Hill Seminar Series invitation (2005)
- Anita Carlson Memorial Lecture (2006)
- Research.com Medicine in Finland Leader Award (2022, 2023, 2025, 2026)
- Research.com Best Scientists Award (2025)

He was nominated for the Nobel Prize in Physiology or Medicine in 2018, 2019, and 2020.

He is a member of the Academia Europaea and has served as Chair of the Finnish Epidemiological Society and the Neuroepidemiology Science Panel of the European Federation of Neurological Sciences. He is a past president of the Finnish Society of Hypertension and the International Diabetes Epidemiology Group.

== Selected publications ==
- Tuomilehto, J.; Lindström, J.; Eriksson, J.G.; et al. (2001). "Prevention of type 2 diabetes mellitus by changes in lifestyle among subjects with impaired glucose tolerance". New England Journal of Medicine. 344 (18): 1343–1350. doi:10.1056/NEJM200105033441801. PMID 11333990.
- Lindström, J.; Louheranta, A.; Mannelin, M.; et al. (2003). "The Finnish Diabetes Prevention Study (DPS): Lifestyle intervention and 3-year results on diet and physical activity". Diabetes Care. 26 (12): 3230–3236. doi:10.2337/diacare.26.12.3230. PMID 14633807.
- Ngandu, T.; Lehtisalo, J.; Solomon, A.; et al. (2015). "A 2 year multidomain intervention of diet, exercise, cognitive training, and vascular risk monitoring versus control to prevent cognitive decline in at-risk elderly people (FINGER): a randomised controlled trial". The Lancet. 385 (9984): 2255–2263. doi:10.1016/S0140-6736(15)60461-5. PMID 25771249.
- Tuomilehto, J.; Uusitupa, M.; Gregg, E.W.; Lindström, J. (2023). "Type 2 Diabetes Prevention Programs—From Proof-of-Concept Trials to National Intervention and Beyond". Journal of Clinical Medicine. 12 (5): 1876. doi:10.3390/jcm12051876. PMC 10003211. PMID 36902668.
