= Climate Watch =

Climate Watch may refer to:

- Climate Watch (World Resources Institute), a website that aggregates and visualizes data on countries' greenhouse gas emissions
- Climate Watch (Kausal Ltd.), a web tool for municipalities and other organisations for monitoring their own climate actions
