= Opasnet =

Opasnet is a web-workspace for making open assessments, which are impact assessments where anyone can freely participate and contribute. Opasnet is a wiki website and it is built on MediaWiki platform. It is currently maintained and developed by the National Institute for Health and Welfare in Finland. Opasnet has won the World Summit Award Finland competition, the eGovernment and Institutions category.

== See also ==
- Open assessment
- Health impact assessment
- Knowledge crystal
- Risk assessment
- Environmental health
