= Elizabeth Mayer-Davis =

American nutritionist and academic

Beth Mayer-Davis
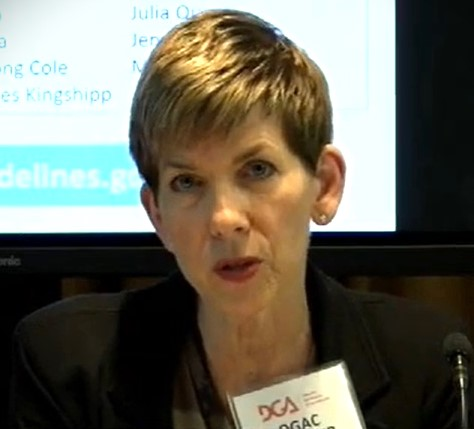
- Mayer-Davis speaks to the US Department of Agriculture in 2019
- Born: Elizabeth Jane Mayer-Davis
- Education: University of California, Berkeley; University of Tennessee; University of Colorado School of Medicine
- Scientific career
- Workplaces: UNC Gillings School of Global Public Health
- Thesis: Genetic and behavioral determinants of insulin concentrations in healthy twins (1992)

Elizabeth "Beth" Mayer-Davis is an American nutritionist who is the Cary C. Boshamer Distinguished Professor at the UNC Gillings School of Global Public Health. She is the Director of the University of North Carolina at Chapel Hill Nutrition Obesity Research Center, and Dean of the UNC Graduate School. She has sought to better understand diabetes. She was awarded the 2019 American Diabetes Association Kelly West Award.

== Early life and education ==
Mayer-Davis says she became interested in diabetes in high school because her friend was diagnosed with type 1. She studied dietetics at the University of Tennessee. She moved to the University of Colorado School of Medicine for graduate studies, where she completed a master's in public health. Mayer-Davis was a doctoral researcher at the University of California, Berkeley, where she studied the genetic determinants of insulin concentration in healthy twins.

== Research and career ==
Mayer-Davis has dedicated her career to understanding the epidemiology of diabetes. She is interested in the ways nutrition impacts diabetes, and the identification of strategies to improve diabetes prognosis. Her research particularly considers youth and young adults and how to support them to manage their own disease.

Mayer-Davis led the Carolina activity for the SEARCH for Diabetes in Youth study, the largest and most diverse study of diabetes among American youth. SEARCH was supported by Centers for Disease Control and Prevention and the National Institute of Diabetes and Digestive and Kidney Diseases. The study found that many young people who had diabetes were not complying with the guidelines for diabetes care, and that this particularly impacted people from low income minority backgrounds.

In 2011, Mayer-Davis was made President for Health Care and Education for the Association. She joined Obama's Advisory Group on Prevention, Health Promotion and Integrative and Public Health. In 2016, Mayer-Davis became Chair of the Department of Nutrition in the UNC Gillings School of Global Public Health. She directed the Nutrition Obesity Research Center, a National Institute of Diabetes and Digestive and Kidney Diseases funded initiative to advance obesity-related research. She was appointed to the United States Department of Agriculture 2020 Dietary Guidelines Advisory Committee.

In 2022, Mayer-Davis was appointed the Carolina lead of the NIH Nutrition for Precision Health Consortium, where she launched the All of Us program, which enrolled thousands of participants to better understand differences in metabolisms and personalized intervention strategies.

In July 2022, Mayer-Davis was appointed Dean of the UNC Graduate School.

== Awards and honors ==
- 2017 American Society for Nutrition Nutrition Education Award
- 2019 American Diabetes Association Kelly West Award Recipient for Outstanding Achievement in Epidemiology

== Selected publications ==
- Elizabeth J Mayer-Davis; Dana Dabelea; Lawrence, Jean (2017). "Incidence Trends of Type 1 and Type 2 Diabetes among Youths, 2002-2012". The New England Journal of Medicine. 377 (3): 301. doi:10.1056/nejmc1706291. PMC 5639715. PMID 28723318. Wikidata Q42376616.
- E J Mayer-Davis; D'Agostino, Ralph Benedict; A J Karter; Haffner, Steven; Rewers, Marian; M Saad; Bergman, Richard (1998). "Intensity and amount of physical activity in relation to insulin sensitivity: the Insulin Resistance Atherosclerosis Study". JAMA. 279 (9): 669–674. doi:10.1001/jama.279.9.669. PMID 9496984. Wikidata Q34459718.
- Alison B. Evert; Jackie L. Boucher; Marjorie Cypress; et al. (2013). "Nutrition therapy recommendations for the management of adults with diabetes" (PDF). Diabetes Care. 36 (11): 3821–3842. doi:10.2337/dc13-2042. PMC 3816916. PMID 24107659. Wikidata Q37278232.
