= Markku Seppälä =

Finnish physician (born 1936)

- Born: 16 May 1936 (age 90); Helsinki, Finland
- Education: University of Helsinki
- Awards: Helsinki University Central Hospital gold merit medal; Order of the White Rose of Finland; Order of the Lion of Finland; Matti Äyräpää Prize
- Scientific career
- Fields: Obstetrics and gynaecology
- Workplaces: University of Helsinki

Markku Tapio Seppälä (born 16 May 1936, Helsinki) is a Finnish physician specialising in obstetrics and gynecology. He graduated with a licentiate in medicine in 1964 and a doctorate in medicine and surgery in 1965. During his research activities that began in 1962, Seppälä has published approx. 500 peer-reviewed studies in international series, including collaborations with two Nobel Prize winners in medicine or physiology (Frederick Chapman Robbins and Robert G. Edwards). His other scholarly output includes 5 books, and around 100 review articles, securing him international acclaim and positioning him among the top researchers in his field as per the Science Citation Index (SCI) in 2002. Seppälä was part of the team that delivered Finland's first IVF baby in 1984. Seppälä was awarded the Matti Äyräpää prize in 1981 for his research on fetal development proteins.

== Career ==
Seppälä worked at HYKS Women's Clinic as an assistant physician in 1966-1969, assistant chief physician in 1970-1975 and assistant professor in 1976-1978. He worked as a research professor at the Academy of Finland in 1978 and 1980, and was a visiting professor at St Bartholomew's Hospital in London in 1979-1980. In 1979, he was appointed Chairman of the first Department of Obstetrics and Gynecology at the University Central Hospital, Helsinki, a position he held until 1999. Seppälä was a professor of obstetrics and gynecology at the University of Helsinki in the years 1979-2001 and as senior physician at the Women's Clinic of HYKS in the years 1980-1999. Seppälä contributed to hospital administration as a Member of the Board of Administrators at the University Central Hospital in Helsinki.

Seppälä has been the editor and member of the Editorial Board of many international scientific publication series, as well as a professorial expert at Stanford, Sydney and Valencia universities and the Bangalore Institute of Science. He has also worked as a WHO expert in Geneva in the 1980s (uterine bleeding), the 1990s (in vitro fertilization) and the 2000s (pregnancy prevention). Seppälä has served on the Board of Trustees of the Population Council (New York) in the years 1984-1993. He has worked as an evaluator of reproductive medicine units at the Singapore State General Hospital in 1995 and at the Mayo Clinic in the United States in 1998.

Later in his career, Seppälä held the position of Emeritus Professor and Senior Research Associate at Biomedicum Helsinki. This center for research and training operates in close collaboration with the University of Helsinki, Helsinki University Central Hospital, and Finland's National Institute of Health and Welfare.

== Role in Finland’s first IVF baby ==
In 1984, Seppälä served as the president of the third World Congress of IVF and Embryo Transfer held in Helsinki. It was at this congress at the Finlandia Hall that Robert Edwards and Jean Cohen, alongside a few colleagues, initiated discussions that led to the creation of the European Society of Human Reproduction and Embryology (ESHRE) later that year.

Seppälä’s continued his work on IVF, and working alongside Aarne Koskimies, the IVF clinic director successfully delivered the birth of Finland’s first IVF baby in 1984.

== Honorary office ==
Seppälä served as the president of the Finnish Gynecological Association in 1983-1985 and as the chairman of the Suomen syöpäyhdistys in the years 1988-1991. Seppälä served on the board of the International Federation of Gynecological Gynaecology and Obstetrics (FIGO) from 1985 to 2003. During his presidency, he was instrumental in restructuring FIGO and enhancing its global initiatives, particularly the Save Motherhood Initiative, which aims to improve women's health in the developing world. He was also a founding member of the European Association of Gynecologists and Obstetricians (EAGO) and served as its General-Secretary and later president from 1994 to 1997. Seppälä served as the representative of the University of Helsinki on the board of HYKS in 1991-1992, and on the board of HUS (Helsinki and Uusimaa Hospital District) in 1999-2001. In the doctoral promotion of the University of Helsinki in 2000, Seppälä served as chairman of the promotion committee and promoter.

== Honours ==
The Finnish Academy of Science and Letters has invited him as a member in 1982, and Seppälä has been invited as an honorary doctorate of the University of Liège in Belgium in 1995. He is also a member of the Finnish, American (ACOG), Brazilian, Chilean, Italian, Romanian, Polish and Chicago Gynecological Associations, as well as a Fellowship ad eundem from the British Fertility Society, Royal College of Obstetricians and Gynecologists (Fellow ad eundem, London 1989). He is an honorary member of the Society for Gynecological Investigation (Washington, DC, USA 1995). Distinguished Scientist Award of the American Society of Reproductive Medicine (1997). He was awarded the HYKS gold merit medal in 1999, the Order of the White Rose of Finland by the President of the Republic of Finland and the Order of the Lion of Finland. In 2016, Markku Seppälä was invited as an honorary member of ESHRE (European Society of Human Reproduction and Embryology).
