= Kelly West Award =

American award for epidemiology research

The Kelly M. West Award for Outstanding Achievement in Epidemiology is an honor bestowed by the American Diabetes Association. It has been awarded annually to an individual since 1986. The award is named in honor of Kelly M. West.

== Winners ==
| Date | Name |
|---|---|
| 2024 | Viswanathan Mohan |
| 2023 | Alka M. Kanaya |
| 2022 | Jill Norris |
| 2021 | Nicholas J. Wareham |
| 2020 | Elizabeth Selvin |
| 2019 | Elizabeth J. Mayer-Davis |
| 2018 | Catherine Cowie |
| 2017 | Dana Dabelea |
| 2016 | Edward W. Gregg |
| 2015 | K.M. Venkat Narayan |
| 2014 | Andrzej S. Krolewski |
| 2013 | Edward J. Boyko |
| 2012 | Knut Borch-Johnsen |
| 2011 | Frederick L. Brancati |
| 2010 | Frank Hu |
| 2009 | James B. Meigs. |
| 2008 | Markku Laakso |
| 2007 | Beverly Balkau |
| 2006 | William H. Herman |
| 2005 | Marian J. Rewers |
| 2004 | Michael Engelgau |
| 2003 | Barbara V. Howard |
| 2002 | David J. Pettitt |
| 2001 | John H. Fuller |
| 2000 | Eveline Eschwege |
| 1999 | Wilfred Y. Fujimoto |
| 1998 | Jaakko Tuomilehto |
| 1997 | Steven M. Haffner |
| 1996 | Richard F. Hamman |
| 1995 | William C. Knowler |
| 1994 | Ronald E. Klein |
| 1993 | Trevor J. Orchard |
| 1992 | Maureen I. Harris |
| 1991 | Paul Zimmet |
| 1990 | Michael P. Stern |
| 1989 | Harry Keen |
| 1988 | Ronald E. LaPorte |
| 1987 | Elizabeth L. Barrett-Connor |
| 1986 | Peter H. Bennett |

== See also ==
- Banting Medal
- List of medicine awards
