= Nilkanth Anant Purandare =

Distinguished Indian obstetrician and gynaecologist

Dr. Nilkanth Anant Purandare M.D., (Born. ), F.R.C.O.G.
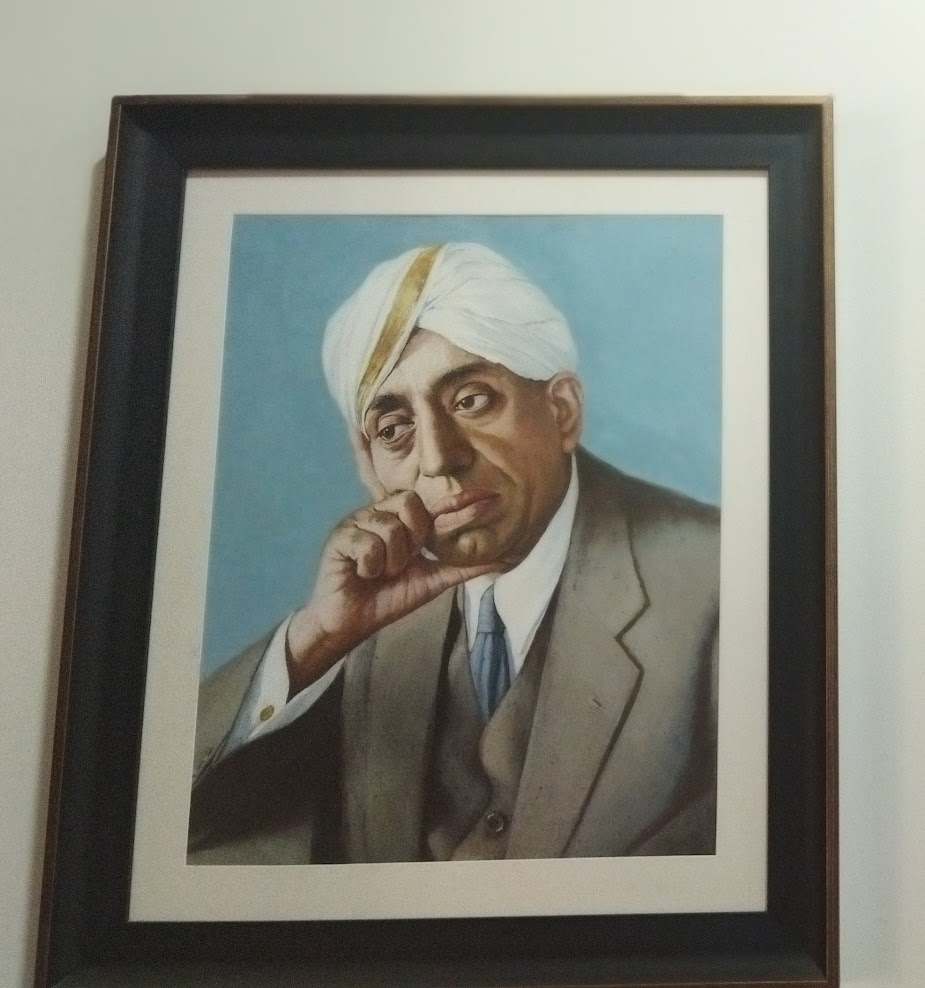
- Born: 27 April 1877; India
- Died: 12 December 1964 (aged 87)
- Education: Grant Medical College
- Occupation: Gynaecologist
- Children: Bhalchandra Nilkanth Purandare

Nilkanth Anant Purandare (1877-1964) was a distinguished Indian obstetrician and gynaecologist.

== Early life and education ==
Purandare was born on 27 April 1877. After passing his matriculation examination, he joined Grant Medical College in 1896. In 1900, he graduated, securing the Charles Morehead Prize in Medicine.

== Career and contributions ==
Purandare began his medical career as an hon. assistant obstetrician and gynaecologist at Bai Motibai and Petit Hospitals, and as a tutor at Grant Medical College. He earned his M.D. in obstetrics and gynaecology with distinction.

In 1926, with the establishment of King Edward Memorial (KEM) Hospital and G.S. Medical College, Purandare was appointed as an hon. professor in midwifery and gynaecology and as hon. obstetrician and gynaecologist. He was later appointed as Hon. Obstetrician at N. Wadia Maternity Hospital.

Purandare was the first president of the Bombay Obstetric and Gynaecological Society and played a key role in the Federation of Obstetric and Gynaecological Societies of India. He presided over the 3rd All India Obstetric and Gynaecological Congress in 1941.

Dr. N.A Purandare's Hospital is located in Mumbai. This hospital was the first registered head office of FOGSI.

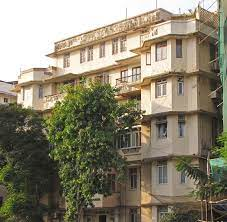
Recent Picture of Purandare Hospital

== Publications ==
1. The Anterior Shoulder as Guide to the Engagement of the Head and to the Progress of Labour.
2. Radiograms taken during Labour from its onset until the Head is Born, indicating the Position of the Anterior and Posterior Shoulders.
3. Height of the Anterior Shoulder and its Relation to the Position of the Foetal Heart.

== Honours ==
- Honorary Fellow of the Royal College of Obstetricians and Gynaecologists, London.
- Honorary Founder Fellow of the Indian Academy of Medical Sciences.
- The Government of India has named a road opposite Girgaon Chowpatty (Dr. N.A Purandare Road) in Mumbai to honour his contributions in the field of medicine

== Death ==
Purandare died on 12 December 1964.
