= KTL =

KTL could refer to:

- KTL (band), a US duo musical project based in France, originally for the theatrical production "Kindertotenlieder"
- KTL (album), self-titled album by KTL

== Acronyms ==
- KTL ("Kansanterveyslaitos"), the National Public Health Institute of Finland
- Chemical Workers' Union (Finland), a Finnish former trade union
- KTL, Korean Testing Lab (ko:한국산업기술시험원), Ministry of Trade, Industry and Energy (South Korea)
- kai ta loipa (και τα λοιπα) Greek abbreviation for "and the rest"
- KTL, Kill This Love, song by South Korean girl group Blackpink

== Codes ==
- Kirton Lindsey railway station, National Rail station code KTL
- Kitale Airport, Kenya IATA airport code KTL
- Koroshi language; ISO 639-3 language code KTL
- Kwun Tong line on the Hong Kong Mass Transit Railway system.
