= Anne-Beatrice Kihara =

Kenyan physician, professor

- Born: Kenya
- Education: University of Nairobi
- Scientific career
- Workplaces: International Federation of Gynecology and Obstetrics

Anne-Beatrice Kihara is a Kenyan physician and professor who is President of the International Federation of Gynaecology and Obstetrics. She has dedicated her career to improving the physical health of women across Africa.

== Early life and education ==
Kihara grew up in Kenya. She became interested in medicine whilst helping her father, Dickson Kihara Nyaga, who was a public health officer. She was a medical student at the University of Nairobi, where she had an unplanned pregnancy. At the age of twenty one she was forced to repeat the year, and eventually had to complete her medical degree as a single mother. After completing her medical degree, she worked as a gynaecologist in Nairobi. She established maternity facilities and a village hospital. She worked to empower local young women by providing them access to work.

== Research and career ==
In 2013, Kihara was made president of the Kenya Obstetrical and Gynaecological Society. She worked to prevent maternal and child deaths and to eliminate the parent-to-child transmission of sexually transmitted infections, including syphilis and HIV. In 2020, she was made President of the African Federation of Obstetricians and Gynaecologists.

In 2023, Kihara became the President of the International Federation of Gynaecology and Obstetrics. She was their first president from Sub-Saharan Africa. She worked to promote women's leadership and involvement in policymaking as well as how to improve access to contraception and health information. She has said that she will focus on transforming the experiences of young women who suffer from child marriages and female genital mutilation. She has promoted the adoption of the Maputo Protocol, which promotes gender equality and gender rights.

== Selected publications ==
- Poon, Liona C.; Shennan, Andrew; Hyett, Jonathan A.; Kapur, Anil; Hadar, Eran; Divakar, Hema; McAuliffe, Fionnuala; da Silva Costa, Fabricio; von Dadelszen, Peter; McIntyre, Harold David; Kihara, Anne B.; Di Renzo, Gian Carlo; Romero, Roberto; D'Alton, Mary; Berghella, Vincenzo (May 2019). "The International Federation of Gynecology and Obstetrics (<scp>FIGO</scp>) initiative on pre‐eclampsia: A pragmatic guide for first‐trimester screening and prevention". International Journal of Gynecology & Obstetrics. 145 (S1): 1–33. doi:10.1002/ijgo.12802. ISSN 0020-7292. PMC 6944283. PMID 31111484.
- Liona C Poon; Huixia Yang; Anil Kapur; et al. (4 April 2020). "Global interim guidance on coronavirus disease 2019 (COVID-19) during pregnancy and puerperium from FIGO and allied partners: Information for healthcare professionals". International Journal of Gynecology & Obstetrics. doi:10.1002/ijgo.13156. ISSN 0020-7292. PMID 32248521. Wikidata Q91573720.
- McAuliffe, Fionnuala M.; Killeen, Sarah Louise; Jacob, Chandni Maria; Hanson, Mark A.; Hadar, Eran; McIntyre, H. David; Kapur, Anil; Kihara, Anne B.; Ma, Ronald C.; Divakar, Hema; Hod, Moshe (2020). "Management of prepregnancy, pregnancy, and postpartum obesity from the FIGO Pregnancy and Non‐Communicable Diseases Committee: A FIGO (International Federation of Gynecology and Obstetrics) guideline". International Journal of Gynecology & Obstetrics. 151 (S1): 16–36. doi:10.1002/ijgo.13334. ISSN 0020-7292. PMC 7590083. PMID 32894590.
