= International Federation of Gynecology and Obstetrics =

Professional medical organisation

FIGO (International Federation of Gynecology and Obstetrics)
- Abbreviation: FIGO
- Formation: 1954-07-26
- Headquarters: FIGO House, Waterloo Court, 10 Theed Street, London, SE1 8ST, UK
- Members: 132 Societies
- President: Anne-Beatrice Kihara
- Website: www.figo.org

The International Federation of Gynecology and Obstetrics, usually just FIGO ("fee'go") as the acronym of its French name Fédération Internationale de Gynécologie et d'Obstétrique, is a worldwide non-governmental organisation representing obstetricians and gynaecologists (Note: The organisation spells its name using "Gynecology", but this article will spell it "Gynaecology" as used in British English for consistency except in proper names.) in over one hundred territories. It was founded on 26 July 1954 in Geneva, Switzerland, to "promote the well-being of women and to raise the standard of practice in obstetrics and gynaecology". Membership is currently composed of 132 professional societies ('National Member Societies') of obstetricians and gynaecologists worldwide.

The headquarters of FIGO was initially located at Geneva, Switzerland. The FIGO Secretariat is located at London, United Kingdom.

== Core activities ==
The aim of FIGO is to improve the health and well-being of women and newborns worldwide. FIGO works to enable every woman to achieve active participation in her own health and rights, and the highest possible standards of health. It is financed by dues of member societies, grants, and educational activities.

FIGO's work covers many critical aspects of obstetrics and gynaecology and women's health and rights, including:

- adolescent health
- cervical cancer
- environmental health
- refugee and migrant health
- noncommunicable diseases (NCDs)
- sexual and reproductive health and rights (SRHR)
- universal health coverage (UHC)

FIGO implements global programmes on specific women's health issues, in collaboration with National Member Societies and/or partner organisations. These include:

- Fistula Surgery Training Initiative
- Postpartum Family Planning (PPIUD)
- Advocating Safe Abortion Project
- Postpartum Haemorrhage (PPH)

FIGO Committees and Working Groups are dedicated to critical sub-specialty issues across obstetrics, gynecology and related fields:

- Contraception and Family Planning (Committee)
- Ethical and Professional Aspects of Human Reproduction and Women's Health (Committee)
- Fistula and Genital Trauma (Committee)
- Gynecologic Oncology (Committee)
- Human Rights, Refugees and Violence Against Women (Committee)
- Menstrual Disorders (Committee)
- Minimal Access Surgery (Committee)
- Pregnancy and Noncommunicable Diseases (Committee)
- Reproductive Developmental Environmental Health (Committee)
- Reproductive Medicine, Endocrinology and Infertility (Committee)
- Safe Abortion (Committee)
- Safe Motherhood and Newborn Health (Committee)
- Urogynecology and Pelvic Floor (Committee)
- Benign Breast Disease (Working Group)
- International Childbirth Initiative (Committee)
- Postpartum Haemorrhage (Working Group)
- Preterm Birth (Working Group)

== Classification systems ==
=== Uterine bleeding ===
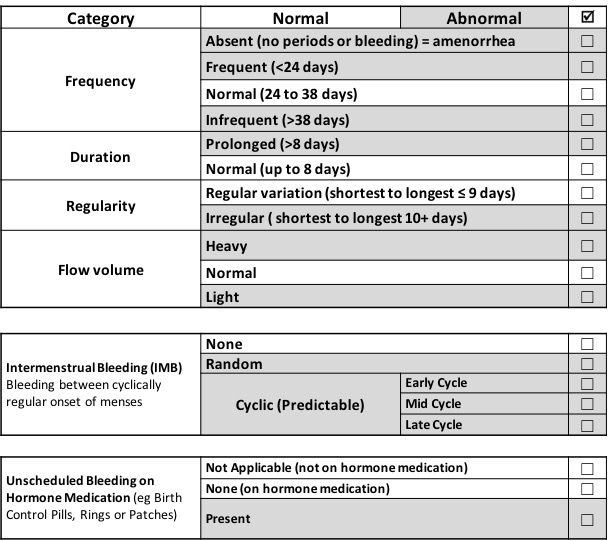
FIGO System 1 for uterine bleeding. The system for definition and nomenclature of normal and abnormal uterine bleeding (AUB) in the reproductive years.

In 2011, FIGO recognised two systems designed to aid research, education, and clinical care of women with abnormal uterine bleeding (AUB) in the reproductive years.

=== Ovarian cancer ===
Ovarian cancer is staged using the FIGO staging system and uses information obtained after surgery, which can include a total abdominal hysterectomy via midline laparotomy, removal of (usually) both ovaries and fallopian tubes, (usually) the omentum, pelvic (peritoneal) washings, assessment of retroperitoneal lymph nodes (including the pelvic and para-aortic lymph nodes), appendectomy in suspected mucinous tumours, and pelvic/peritoneal biopsies for cytopathology.

== Publications ==
Major publications include:

- International Journal of Gynecology & Obstetrics – peer-reviewed journal published monthly by Wiley Online Library.
- "FIGO Newsletter" – published monthly, electronically
- FIGO Ethics Guidelines have been reproduced (with commentary) in academic periodicals: e.g. (2006) 7 Medical Law International 361.

== World Congress of Gynecology and Obstetrics ==
FIGO conducts a triennial meeting, the World Congress of Obstetrics and Gynecology. In addition the society sponsors fellowships and lectures, provides reports about women's health, and offers grants. Importantly through international committees consensus guidelines are achieved about evaluation and treatment of gynaecological and obstetrical disorders.

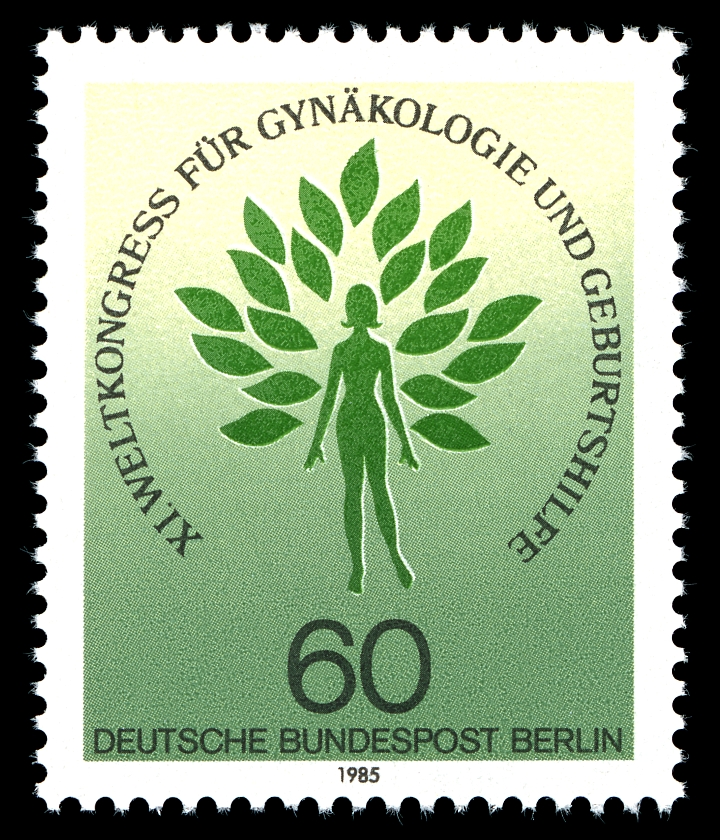
German stamp, XI FIGO World Congress 1985

No	Date	City
II	22–28 June 1958	Montreal
V	23–30 September 1967	Sydney
VI	April 1970	New York
VII	August 1973	Moscow
VIII	17–22 October 1976	Mexico
IX	25–31 October 1979	Tokyo
X	17–22 October 1982	San Francisco
XI	15–20 September 1985	Berlin
XII	October 1988	Rio de Janeiro
XIII	August 1991	Singapore
XIV	September 1994	Montreal
XV	August 1997	Copenhagen
XVI	August 2000	Washington DC
XVII	2–7 November 2003	Santiago
XVIII	November 2006	Kuala Lumpur
XIX	4–9 October 2009	Cape Town
XX	7–12 October 2012	Rome
XXI	4-9 October 2015	Vancouver
XXII	14-19 October 2018	Rio de Janeiro
XXIV	9–12 October 2023	Paris

== Member associations ==
The following 124 professional societies are members of FIGO as of December 2010:

- Afghan Society of Obstetricians and Gynaecologists
- Albanian Association of Obstetrics and Gynaecology
- American Congress of Obstetricians and Gynaecologists, The
- Argentine Federation of Obstetric and Gynaecological Societies (FASGO)
- Asociacion de Ginecologia y Obstetricia de Guatemala (AGOG)
- Asociacion de Obstetricia y Ginecologia de Costa Rica
- Associação Moçambicana de Obstetras e Ginecologistas (AMOG)
- Association of Gynaecologists and Obstetricians of Tanzania (The AGOTA)
- Association of Gynecologists and Obstetricians of Macedonia
- Association of Gynecologists and Obstetricians of Serbia, Montenegro and Republic Srpska (UGOSCGRS)
- Association of Obstetricians and Gynaecologists of Malawi (AOGM)
- Association of Obstetricians and Gynaecologists of Uganda
- Association Sénégalaise de Gynécologie-Obstétrique (ASGO)
- Bulgarian Society of Obstetrics and Gynecology, The
- Chinese Society of Obstetrics and Gynecology, The
- Collège National des Gynécologues et Obstétriciens Français
- Croatian Society of Gynecologists and Obstetricians
- Cyprus Gynaecological and Obstetrics Society
- Czech Gynecological and Obstetrical Society
- Dansk Selskab for Obstetrik og Gynækologi
- Deutsche Gesellschaft für Gynäkologie und Geburtshilfe
- Dutch Society of Obstetrics and Gynaecology, The
- Egyptian Society of Gynaecology and Obstetrics, The
- Emirate Medical Association
- Eritrean Medical Association (ERIMA)
- Ethiopian Society of Obstetricians and Gynecologists
- Federaçao Brasileira das Sociedades de Ginecologia e Obstetricia (FEBRASGO)
- Federación Colombiana de Asociaciones de Obstetricia y Ginecología
- Federación Ecuatoriana de Sociedades de Ginecología y Obstetricia
- Federación Mexicana de Colegios de Obstetricia y Ginecologia (FEMECOG)
- Federation of Obstetrics & Gynaecological Societies of India (FOGSI)
- Finnish Gynecological Association
- Georgian Obstetricians and Gynecologists Association (GOGA)
- Grabham Society of Obstetricians and Gynaecologists, The
- Hellenic Obstetrical and Gynaecological Society
- Hungarian Society of Obstetrics and Gynaecology
- Icelandic Society of Obstetrics and Gynecology
- Institute of Obstetricians and Gynaecologists of the Royal College of Physicians of Ireland
- Iraqi Society of Obstetrics & Gynecology (ISOG)
- Israel Society of Obstetrics and Gynecology
- Japan Society of Obstetrics and Gynecology
- Jordanian Society of Obstetricians and Gynaecologists, The
- Kenya Obstetrical and Gynaecological Society
- Koninklijke BelgischeVerenigning voor Gynecologie en Verloskunde/Societé Royale Belge de Gynécologie et d’Obstetrique
- Korean Society of Obstetrics and Gynecology
- Kuwait Medical Association: The Profession of Obstetrics and Gynaecology
- Kyrgyz Association of Obstetricians, Gynecologists and Neonatologists (KOAGN)
- Latvian Association of Gynaecologists and Obstetricians
- Libyan Obstetrical and Gynaecological Association
- Lithuanian Association of Obstetricians and Gynecologists
- Macau Association of Obstetric and Gynaecology
- Malta College of Obstetricians and Gynaecologists
- Myanmar Medical Association
- National Association of Iranian Obstetricians & Gynecologists (NAIGO)
- Nepal Society of Obstetricians and Gynaecologists (NESOG)
- Norsk gynekologisk Forening (Norwegian Society for Gynecology and Obstetrics)
- Obstetrical & Gynaecological Society of Hong Kong
- Obstetrical & Gynaecological Society of Malaysia
- Obstetrical & Gynaecological Society of Singapore
- Obstetrical & Gynaecological Society of the Sudan
- Obstetrical and Gynaecological Society of Bangladesh
- Oesterreichische Gesellschaft fur Gynakologie und Geburtshilfe (Austrian Society of Gynaecology and Obstetrics)
- Papua New Guinea Obstetrics and Gynaecology Society
- Perkumpulan Obstetri Dan Ginekologi Indonesia (Indonesian Society of Obstetrics & Gynecology)
- Philippine Obstetrical & Gynecological Society, INC
- Polish Gynaecological Society (Polskie Towarzystwo Ginekologiczne)
- Republic of Armenia Association of Obstetricians/Gynecologists and Neonatologists
- Romanian Society of Obstetric and Gynecology
- Royal Australian and New Zealand College of Obstetricians and Gynaecologists, The
- Royal College of Obstetricians and Gynaecologists (UK)
- Royal Thai College of Obstetricians and Gynaecologists, The
- Russian Society of Obstetricians and Gynaecologists
- Saudi Obstetrical and Gynaecological Society
- Schweizerische Gesellschaft für Gynäkologie und Geburtshilf/Société Suisse de Gynécologie & Obstétrique
- Shoqata e Obstetërve dhe Gjinekologëve te Kosovës/Kosovo Obstetrics and Gynaecology Association (KOGA)
- Sierra Leone Association of Gynaecologists and Obstetricians
- Slovak Society of Gynecology and Obstetrics
- Slovene Association of Gynaecologists and Obstetricians
- Sociedad Boliviana de Obstetricia y Ginecología
- Sociedad Chilena de Obstetricia y Ginecología
- Sociedad Cubana de Obstetricia y Ginecología
- Sociedad de Ginecología y Obstetricia de El Salvador
- Sociedad de Ginecología y Obstetricia de Honduras
- Sociedad de ObstetriciayGinecología de Venezuela
- Sociedad Dominicana de Obstetricia y Ginecologia
- Sociedad Espanõla de Ginecología y Obstetricia
- Sociedad Ginecotocologica del Uruguay
- Sociedad Nicaragüense de Ginecología y Obstetricia
- Sociedad Panamenã de Obstetricia y Ginecología
- Sociedad Paraguaya de Ginecología y Obstetricia
- Sociedad Peruana de Obstetricia y Ginecología
- Sociedade Portuguesa de Obstetricia e Ginecologia
- Società Italiana di Ginecologia e Ostetricia
- Societé Algérienne de Gynécologye-Obstétrique
- Societe de Gynecologie et d'Obstetrique du Benin et du Togo CUGO-CNHU
- Société de Gynécologie et d’Obstétrique de Bénin
- Societe de Gynecologie et d’Obstetrique de Côte d'Ivoire
- Societé de Gynécologie et Obstétrique du Niger (SGON)
- Societé de Gynécologues et Obstétriciens du Burkina (SOGOB)
- Société Gabonaise de Gynécologie Obstétrique et de la Reproduction (SGGOR)
- Société Guinéenne de Gynécologie-Obstétrique
- Societe Haitienne d’Obstetrique et de Gynecologie
- Société Libanaise d'Obstétrique et de Gynécologie (Lebanese Society of Obstetrics & Gynecology)
- Société Luxembourgeoise de Gynécologie et d’Obstétrique
- Societé Malienne de Gynécologie Obstétrique (SOMAGO)
- Société Royale Marocaine de Gynécologie Obstétrique
- Société Tunisienne de Gynécologie et d’Obstétrique
- Society of Estonian Gynaecologists
- Society of Gynaecologists and Obstetricians of Ghana (Ghana Medical Association)
- Society of Gynaecology and Obstetrics of Nigeria (SOGON)
- Society of Gynecologists and Obstetricians of Cameroon (SOGOC)
- Society of Obstetricians and Gynaecologists of Pakistan
- Society of Obstetricians and Gynaecologists of Canada, The/Societé des Obstétriciens et Gynécolgues du Canada
- Society of Obstetricians and Gynecologists of Republic of Moldova
- Society of Palestinian Gynaecologists and Obstetricians
- South African Society of Obstetricians and Gynaecologists, The
- Sri Lanka College of Obstetricians and Gynaecologists
- Svensk Förening För Obstetrik & Gynekologi (The Swedish Society of Obstetrics and Gynecology)
- Syrian Society of Obstetricians & Gynecologists
- Taiwan Association of Obstetrics and Gynecology, The
- Turkish Society of Obstetrics and Gynecology
- Ukrainian Association of Obstetricians and Gynaecologists, The
- Vietnam Gynaecology and Obstetrics Association VINAGOFPA
- Zambia Association of Gynaecologists & Obstetricians (ZAGO)
- Zimbabwe Society of Obstetricians and Gynaecologists, The (ZSOG)

== Former presidents ==
Source (up to 2006):

- Hubert de Watteville, president from 1954 to 1958, first FIGO president
- Leon Gérin-Lajoie, president from 1954 to 1958, Quebecois professor
- Raymond Keller, president from 1959 to 1961
- Howard C. Taylor, Jr, president from 1961 to 1964
- Giuseppe Tesauro, president from 1964 to 1967
- Alfonso Alvarez-Bravo, president from 1967 to 1970
- John Harold Peel, president from 1970 to 1973, leading British obstetrician and gynaecologist, Surgeon-Gynaecologist to Elizabeth II from 1961 to 1973, present at a number of royal births
- Bhalchandra Nilkanth Purandare, president from 1973 to 1976
- Robert Caldeyro-Barcia, president from 1976 to 1979, Uruguayan doctor, pioneer in the field of maternal-foetal medicine, co-creator of Montevideo units, a measure of uterine performance during labour
- Keith Palmer Russell, president from 1979 to 1982
- Claude Sureau, president from 1982 to 1985
- Shan Rattan, president from 1985 to 1988
- José Aristodemo Pinotti, president from 1988 to 1991, Brazilian physician, gynaecological surgeon, university professor, scientific and educational leader and politician
- John J. Sciarra, president from 1991 to 1994
- Mahmoud F. Fathalla, president from 1994 to 1997
- Markku Seppälä, president from 1997 to 2000, Finnish specialist in obstetrics and gynaecology, published approximately 500 peer-reviewed studies in international journals, winner of multiple awards such as the Matti Äyräpää Prize
- Shirish Sheth, president from 2000 to 2003
- Arnaldo Acosta, president from 2003 to 2006
- Dorothy Shaw, president from 2006 to 2009, first female FIGO president
- Gamal Serour, president from 2009 to 2012
- Sir Sabaratnam Arulkumaran, president from 2012 to 2015
- Chittaranjan Narahari Purandare, president from 2015 to 2018
- Carlos Füchtner, president from 2018 to 2021
- Jeanne Conry, president from 2021 to 2024
- Anne-Beatrice Kihara, president from 2024 to 2027
