= Open assessment =

Open assessment is a method for making impact assessments where anyone can participate and contribute. Most open assessments have been made in Opasnet, which is a wiki-based web-workspace specifically designed for this purpose. The open assessment method has been developed in the Finnish Institute for Health and Welfare (THL, Finnish: Terveyden ja hyvinvoinnin laitos) in Finland originally for providing guidance in complex environmental health problems. So far, it has been applied on e.g. air pollution and pollutants in fish. Opasnet has won the World Summit Award Finland competition, the eGovernment and Institutions category.

== See also ==
- Opasnet
- Health impact assessment
- Risk assessment
- Environmental health
