= Trevor J. Orchard =

British-American hold epidemiologist

Trevor J. Orchard is a British-American hold epidemiologist currently a distinguished professor at University of Pittsburgh. He received the Kelly West Award in 1993.
