= Society of Obstetricians and Gynaecologists of Pakistan =

Medical association in Pakistan

The Society of Obstetricians and Gynaecologists of Pakistan (SOGP) is a professional medical association formed by practitioners of obstetrics and gynecology in Pakistan. A member of the International Federation of Gynecology and Obstetrics (FIGO), the body was established in 1957 and is among the oldest specialist professional bodies. When Prof. H.Dewattleville, the President of FIGO at that time, visited Karachi, he addressed staff and students at the Dow Medical College and members of the Pakistan Medical Council (now Pakistan Medical and Dental Council) and stressed the need for such an organisation in the country. The first constitution of the organisation was signed and published by the Journal of Pakistan Medical Association in June 1957.

Today, it is the largest and most prominent organisation of obstetricians and gynaecologists in the country. SOGP is also a member of the South Asia Federation of Obstetrics and Gynaecology (SAFOG) and works in close collaboration with other national medical committees around the world. In 1997, Pakistan was also elected to the Executive Board of FIGO.
