= Argentine Federation of Obstetric and Gynaecological Societies =

The Argentine Federation of Obstretic and Gynaecological Societies (Spanish: Federación Argentina de Sociedades de Ginecología y Obstetricia, FASGO) is a professional organization representing practitioners of obstetrics and gynecology in Argentina. It encompasses 28 branch societies and 19 affiliated societes from different provinces of the country.

== History ==
FASGO was founded in San Fernando del Valle de Catamarca on September 6, 1956, by Pedro Figueroa Casas.

== Operations ==
FASGO holds an annual conference, the host province changing each year. FASGO is a member of both the International Federation of Gynecology and Obstetrics (FIGO) and the Latin American Federation of Obstetric and Gynaecological Societes (FLASOG). FASGO dictates online courses to certified practitioners. A scientific journal, FASGO Journal (Spanish: Revista FASGO), is published triannually.
