= Riitta Hari =

Finnish neuroscientist, physician and professor

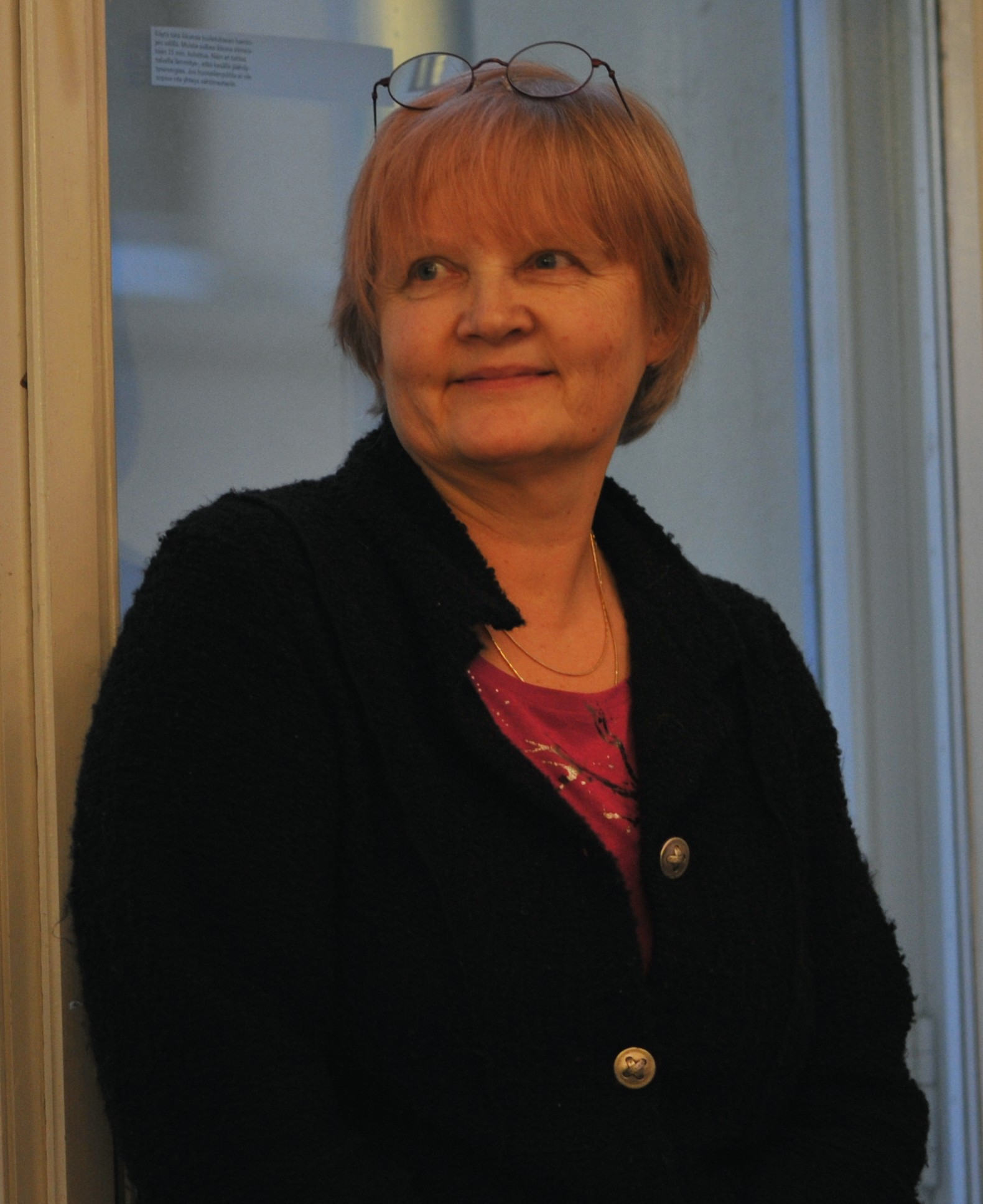
- Riitta Hari in January 2011
- Born: January 16, 1948 (age 78); Mikkeli
- Citizenship: Finnish
- Awards: Finnish Science Award; Louis-Jeantet Prize for Medicine (2003); US National Academy of Sciences Member; Honorary Doctorate from the University of Lisbon; Justine and Yves Sergent Prize; Award for the Advancement of European Science; Honorary Doctorate from the University of Kuopio; Matti Äyräpää Award
- Scientific career
- Fields: Neurophysiology
- Institutions: University of Helsinki

Riitta Kyllikki Hari (born 16 January 1948) is a Finnish neuroscientist, physician and professor at Aalto University. She has led the Brain Research Unit at the Low Temperature Laboratory since 1982. Hari was appointed as Academician of Science on 26 November 2010.

Her most significant achievements relate to the understanding of healthy and diseased human cortex development. This involves magnetoencephalography, a process that allows for investigation of neuronal activity in the brain in a non-invasive way.

== Education ==
Hari graduated from the University of Helsinki as a doctor in 1974 and Doctor of Medical Science in 1980 (specialising in clinical neurophysiology since 1981).

== Research interests ==
Her research interests are varied and cover many areas of neuroscience. For example:

- Brain basis of social interaction and cognition.
- Auditory, tactile, visual and multisensory perception.
- Acute and chronic pain.
- Cortical control of motor action.
- Development of noninvasive human brain imaging (MEG, fMRI, DTI).
- Eye tracking.
- Clinical applications of brain imaging (especially MEG).
- Attempts to converge different perspectives on human brain & mind

== Publications ==
Hari has published nearly 300 peer-reviewed journal articles and numerous other publications. As of Autumn 2016 her publications have been cited more than 36,000 times.

== Awards ==
Hari has been granted several prestigious awards and recognitions both abroad and in her home country of Finland, including an honorary doctorate from the University of Lisbon in 2003, the Louis-Jeantet Prize for Medicine in Switzerland in 2003, the Justine and Yves Sergent Prize for Cognitive Neuroscience in Canada in 2002 and the Award for the Advancement of European Science in Germany in 1987, and the Finnish Science Award in 2009, an honorary doctorate from the University of Kuopio in 2005 and the Matti Äyräpää Prize in 2001.
