= Matti Äyräpää Prize =

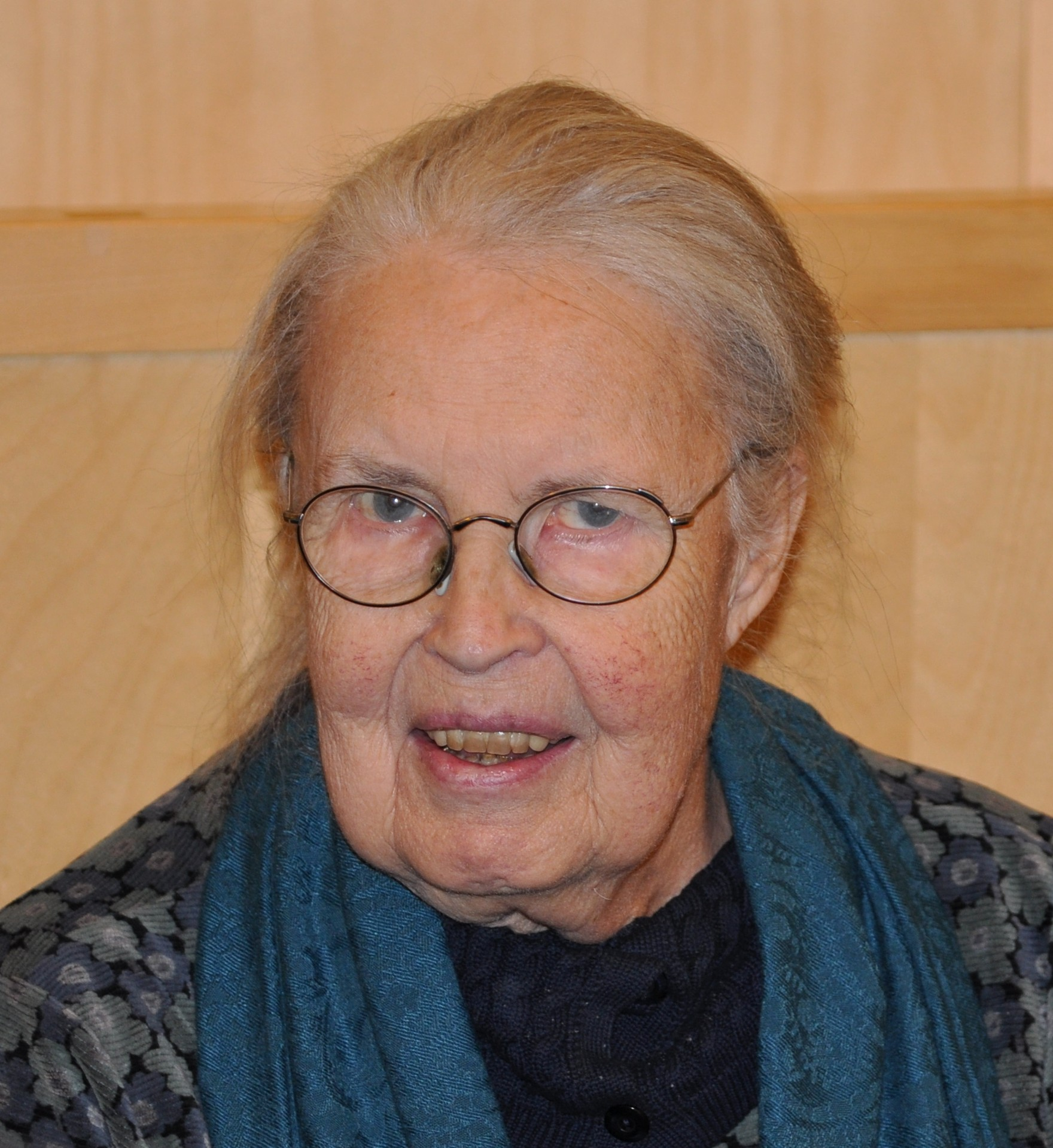
Pirjo Mäkelä received the prize in 1980.

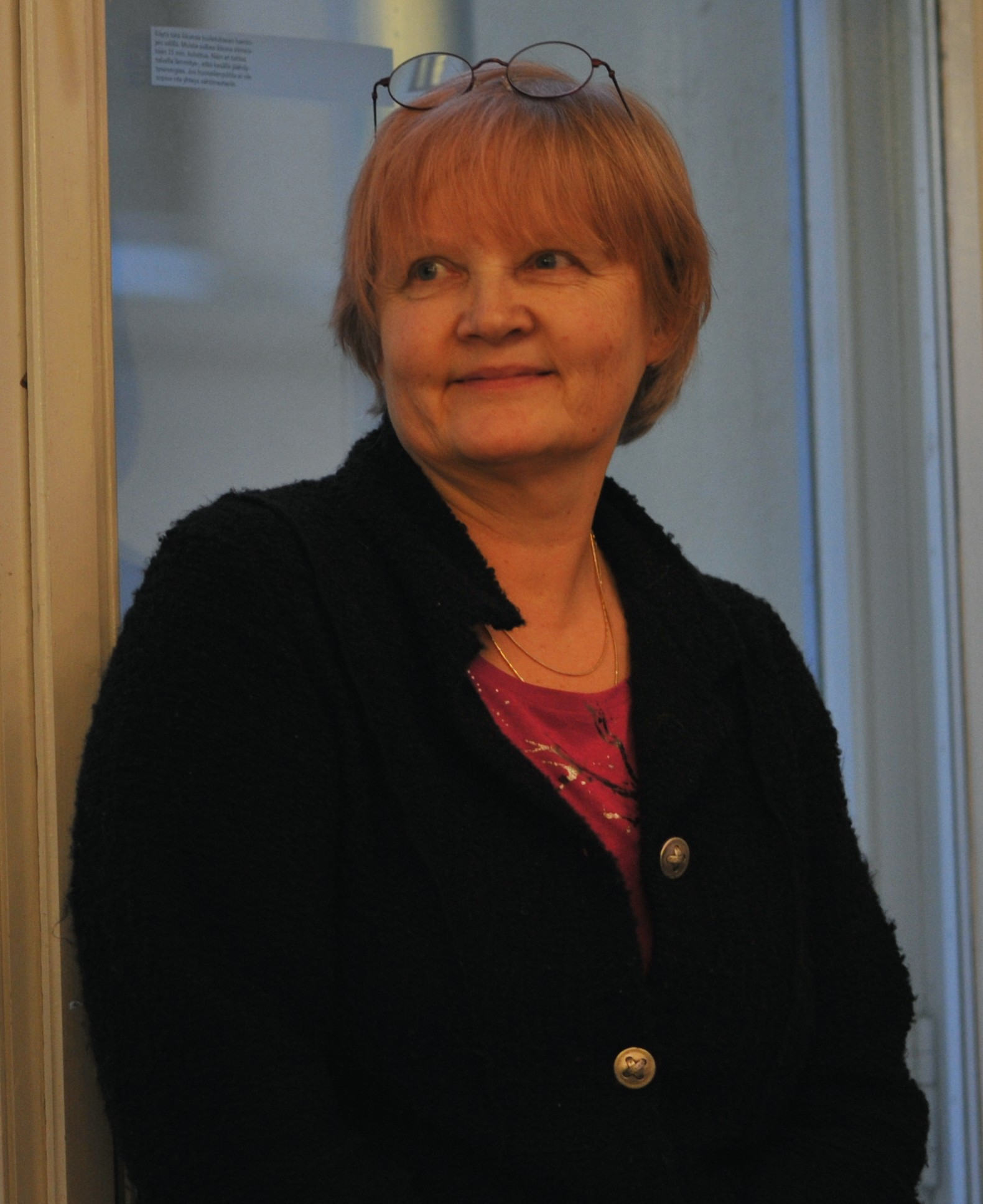
Riitta Hari received the prize in 2001.

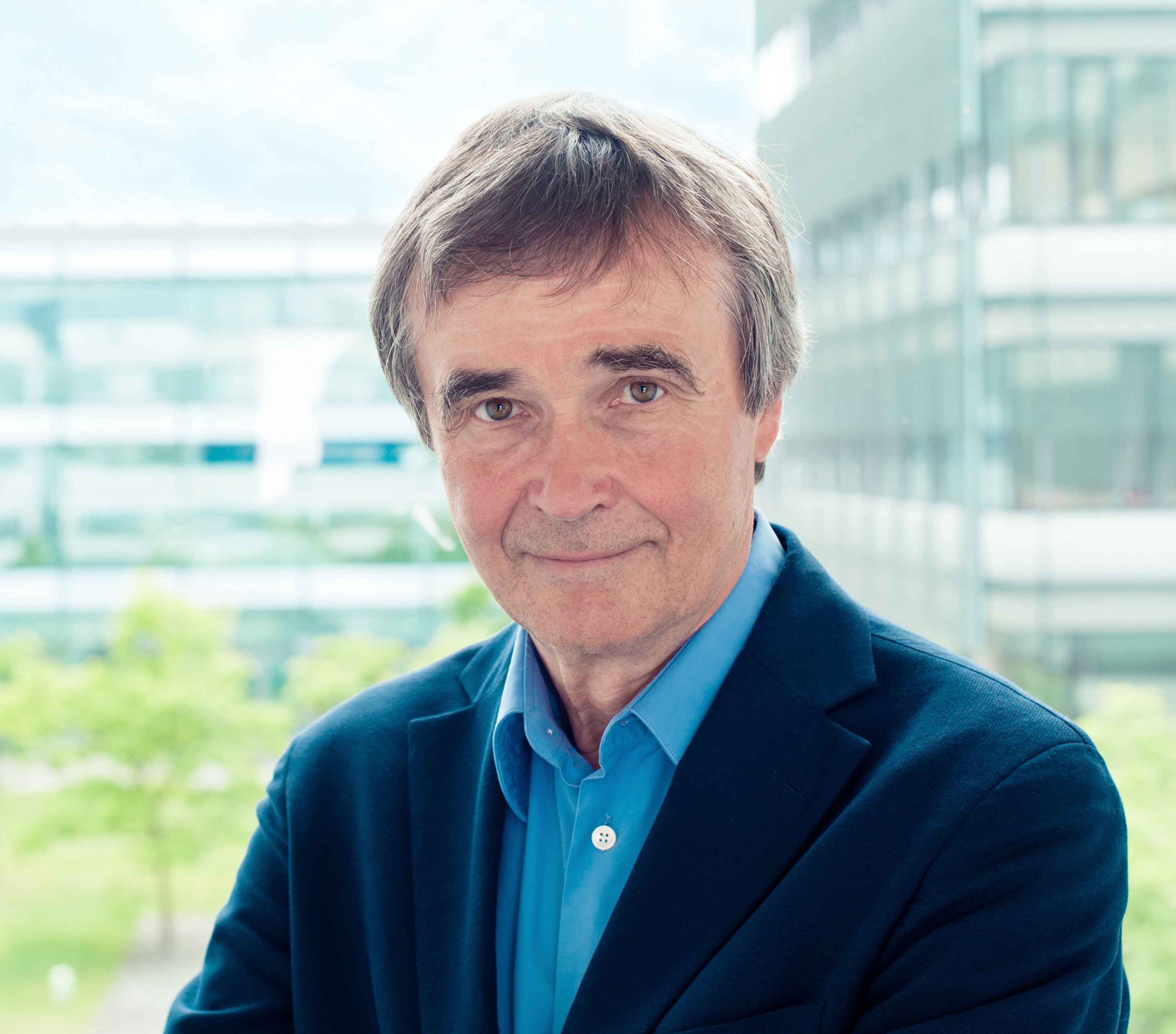
Kai Simons received the prize in 2003.

The Matti Äyräpää Prize (Finnish: Matti Äyräpään palkinto) is a Finnish prize in medicine awarded by The Finnish Medical Society Duodecim since 1969. It is named after the dentist Matti Äyräpää, who was Duodecim's first chairman.

In 2016, the prize money was €20,000.

== Recipients ==
- 1969 – Eino Kulonen
- 1970 – Kauko Vainio
- 1971 – Esko Nikkilä
- 1972 – Olli Mäkelä
- 1973 – Olavi Eränkö
- 1974 – Kari Penttinen
- 1975 – Lauri Saxén
- 1976 – Erkki Klemola
- 1977 – Kari Kivirikko
- 1978 – Kari Cantell
- 1979 – Bror-Axel Lamberg
- 1980 – Pirjo Mäkelä
- 1981 – Markku Seppälä
- 1982 – Reijo Vihko
- 1983 – Eero Saksela
- 1984 – Tatu Miettinen
- 1985 – Antti Vaheri
- 1986 – Olli Jänne
- 1987 – Mikko Hallman
- 1988 – Pekka Häyry
- 1989 – Pekka Halonen
- 1990 – Albert de la Chapelle
- 1991 – Leevi Kääriäinen
- 1992 – Tapani Luukkainen
- 1993 – Mårten Wikström
- 1994 – Juhani Jänne
- 1995 – Jouni Uitto
- 1996 – Leena Palotie
- 1997 – Carl G. Gahmberg
- 1998 – Kari Alitalo
- 1999 – Ilpo Huhtaniemi
- 2000 – Pekka Saikku
- 2001 – Riitta Hari
- 2002 – Matti Haltia
- 2003 – Kai Simons
- 2004 – Petri Kovanen
- 2005 – Kimmo Kontula
- 2006 – Lauri A. Aaltonen
- 2007 – Markku Laakso
- 2008 – Sirpa Jalkanen
- 2009 – Seppo Ylä-Herttuala
- 2010 – Jorma Viikari
- 2011 – Juha Kere
- 2012 – Heikki Joensuu
- 2013 – Taina Pihlajaniemi
- 2014 – Leif Groop
- 2015 – Heikki Huikuri
- 2016 – Erika Isolauri

...

- 2021 – Anu Wartiovaara

== See also ==
- List of medicine awards
