= Eero Saksela =

Eero Juhani Saksela (6 January 1937 – 16 February 2023) was a Finnish professor of medicine.

He was born in Helsinki. He became a physician and took his medical doctorate in 1962. Having been chief physician at the Helsinki University Central Hospital, he was a professor of pathological anatomy at the University of Helsinki from 1981 to 2001.

Saksela was awarded the Matti Äyräpää Prize in 1983. was a member of the Finnish Academy of Science and Letters from 1983 and the Norwegian Academy of Science and Letters from 1993. He got honorary membership in the Wiipurilainen Osakunta in 1995.

He is the father of Kalle Saksela.
