= Catherine Cowie =

American epidemiologist

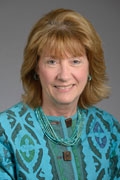
- Education: University of Michigan School of Public Health (M.P.H., Ph.D.)
- Awards: Kelly West Award (2018)
- Scientific career
- Fields: Diabetes epidemiology
- Workplaces: National Institute of Diabetes and Digestive and Kidney Diseases
- Thesis: Racial disparity in diabetic end-stage renal disease: trends in incidence, survival and possible explanatory factors (1988)
- Doctoral advisor: Victor M. Hawthorne

Catherine Christine Cowie is an American epidemiologist. She is a program director and senior advisor at the National Institute of Diabetes and Digestive and Kidney Diseases.

== Education ==
Cowie completed a master of public health from University of Michigan School of Public Health in 1979. She completed a Ph.D. at University of Michigan and worked as a research associate and graduate teaching assistant from 1981 to 1988. Her dissertation was titled Racial disparity in diabetic end-stage renal disease: trends in incidence, survival and possible explanatory factors. Victor M. Hawthorne was the chairperson of her dissertation.

== Career ==
From 1979 to 1981, Cowie was an epidemiologist at Upjohn. She was an epidemiologist focused on social and scientific systems at National Institute of Diabetes and Digestive and Kidney Diseases (NIDDK) from 1988 to 1996. She is a program director and senior advisor in the NIDDK Division of Diabetes, Endocrinology, and Metabolic Diseases. Cowie directs programs researching diabetes epidemiology. Her responsibilities include scientific oversight of the Diabetes Control and Complications Trial/Epidemiology of Diabetes Interventions and Complications study (DCCT/EDIC). She manages diabetes epidemiology interests (e.g., developing national survey components, analyzing and publishing resultant data, mentoring epidemiologists, and directing computer programmers). Cowie chairs the NIDDK Epidemiology Group Committee. She edited the books Diabetes in America and Diabetes Public Health: From Data to Policy. Currently, Cowie manages the development of and analysis for the third edition of Diabetes in America. She represents the NIDDK on the National Diabetes Statistics Report, is involved in a variety of other HHS diabetes epidemiology projects, and is a member of various trans-NIDDK, NIH, and HHS committees related to clinical and epidemiologic research.

== Awards and honors ==
In June 2018, Cowie received the American Diabetes Association Kelly West Award for Outstanding Achievement in Epidemiology in recognition of her significant contributions to the field of diabetes epidemiology.
