= Kalle Saksela =

Finnish researcher, professor of virology (University of Helsinki)

Kalle M. Saksela (born 10 September 1962) is a Finnish virologist. He has been a professor at University of Helsinki since 2005, where he leads the virology department.

== Early life and education ==
Saksela was born on 10 September 1962 in Philadelphia. His father, Eero Saksela, was professor of medicine at the University of Helsinki. In 1989 Saksela obtained his MD and PhD from the University of Helsinki under the supervision of Kari Alitalo.

== Career ==
In 1989/1990 Saksela was research fellow with Helsinki's department of virology. In 1991 Saksela worked as a postdoctoral fellow with David Baltimore at the Whitehead Institute for Biomedical Research, Cambridge, Massachusetts, and then followed him to the Rockefeller University. There he worked as an assistant professor From 1994 to 1996. After that he returned to Finland to become a professor for molecular medicine with the Institute for Medical Technology at the University of Tampere, but until 2000 he also remained an adjunct professor with James E. Darnell's laboratory at The Rockefeller University. 2005 Saksela moved to Helsinki to become a professor of virology at the University of Helsinki and the chairman of its virology department. In addition he also became the chief physician of the University Hospital's HUSLAB.

== COVID-19-related research ==
Saksela and coworkers developed during the spring of 2020 a patent-free COVID-19 vaccine, which uses an adenovirus as a delivery system for genetic information to trigger the production of the spike protein of SARS-CoV-2. While being successful in animal trials the project could not secure funding for large human trials. Later in the year Saksela co-founded Rokote Laboratories with researchers from the University of Eastern Finland to develop a nasal spray that could be used to administer the COVID-19 vaccine.

== Recognition ==
In 2002 Saksela was awarded the Anders Jahre Prize for Young Scientists by the University of Oslo for his research on Aids. In 2003 he became a member of the Finnish Academy of Science and Letters.
