= Sirpa Jalkanen =

Finnish scientist

- Born: February 28, 1954 (age 72); Jyväskylä, Finland
- Education: University of Turku
- Scientific career
- Fields: Biomedical sciences
- Workplaces: University of Turku

Sirpa Jalkanen (born 28 February 1954) is a Finnish scientist, working in the field of biomedical and clinical medicine, at the University of Turku in Finland.

== Career ==
Jalkanen was born in Jyväskylä, Finland. She is one of the world’s leading researchers in the area of lymphocyte migration in the human immune defence system. Jalkanen is an Academy Professor (2014-) in the Academy of Finland. She has served as Academy Professor on two previous occasions, in 1996–2001 and 2002–2006. During her term as Academy Professor, the focus of Professor Jalkanen’s research is on the mechanisms controlling the movement of cells in and out of lymph nodes. Her research is conducted as part of the Strategic Centre for Science, Technology and Innovation SalWe. She is a member of Finnish Academy of Science and Letters and the Norwegian Academy of Science and Letters. In 2008, she was awarded the Matti Äyräpää Prize. Since 2020 she has been a director of InFLAMES Research Flagship, which belongs to the Finnish Flagship Programme of the Research Council of Finland .
