= Markku Laakso =

Finnish diabetes researcher and professor of internal medicine

Markku Laakso (born 1949 in Vampula) is a Finnish professor of medicine and a type 2 diabetes researcher. He was awarded the Matti Äyräpää Prize in 2007, the Kelly West Award in 2008, and the Finnish Science Award in 2015.

Laakso’s research focuses on the molecular genetics of type 2 diabetes and its cardiovascular complications. He has participated in numerous international clinical trials and genetic studies, including FUSION (Finland–United States Investigation of Type 2 Diabetes Genetics), a large-scale collaboration aimed at identifying susceptibility genes, and METSIM (Metabolic Syndrome in Men), a longitudinal cohort of over 10,000 men used to identify genetic variants and biomarkers associated with insulin resistance.

Research he co-authored has examined the Pro12Ala polymorphism of the PPARG in relation to insulin sensitivity and diabetes risk. Further collaborative studies have reported that the Ala12Ala genotype is associated with lower carotid intima-media thickness, a marker of subclinical atherosclerosis, suggesting a potential protective effect.
