= D. Y. Patil Hospital =

- D. Y. Patil Group, Navi Mumbai
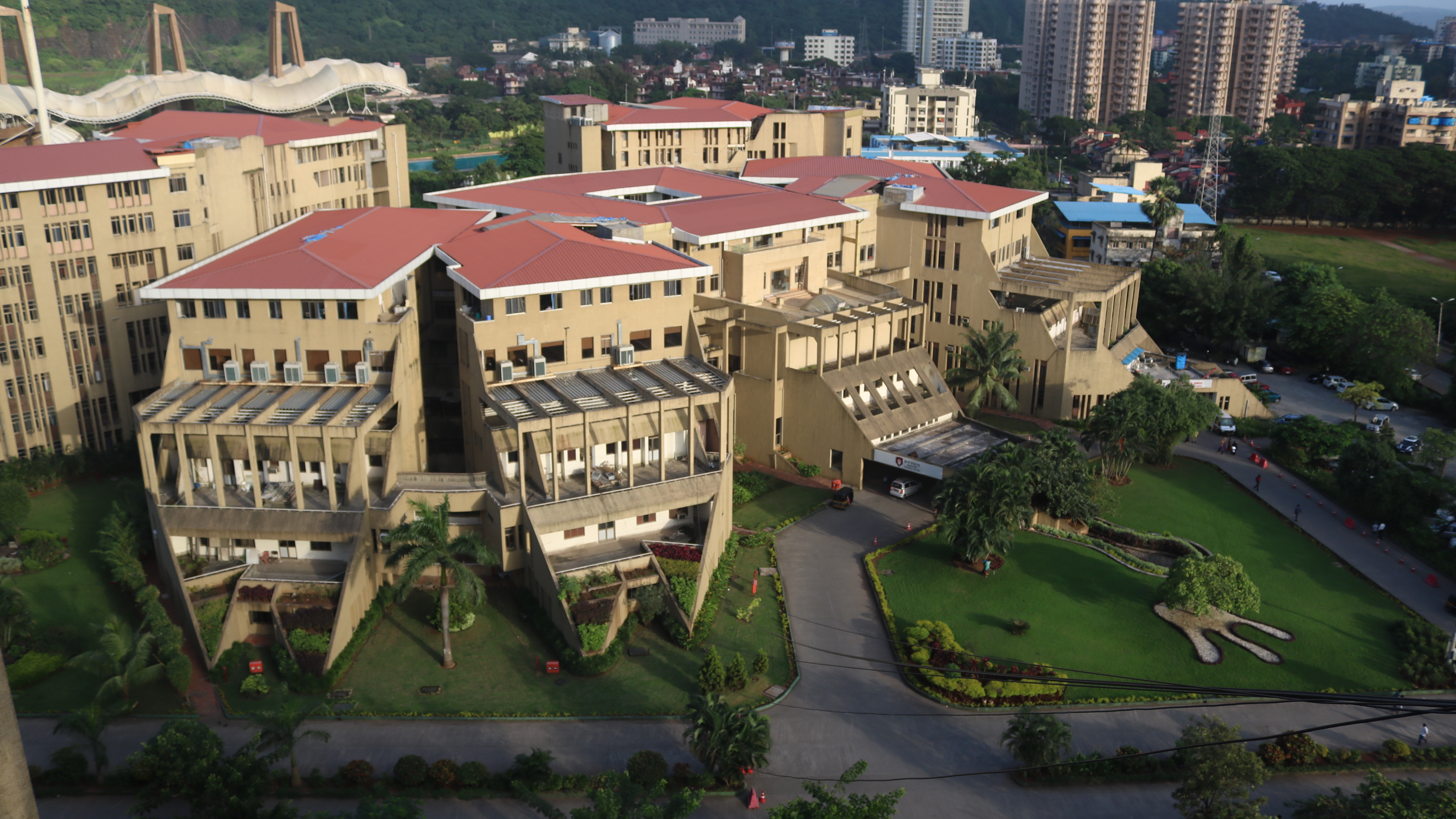

Geography
- Location: Nerul, Navi Mumbai, Maharashtra, India
- Coordinates: 19.0415923°N 73.0221769°E

Organisation
- Patron: Dr. Vijay D. Patil

Services
- Emergency department: Yes
- Beds: 1500

History
- Founded: 4 April 2004

Links
- Website: Official website
- Lists: Hospitals in India

D. Y. Patil Hospital or D.Y.P.H.R.C. (D. Y. Patil Hospital and Research Centre - Navi Mumbai) is a charitable hospital in Navi Mumbai, India. It was founded in 2004 by Shri Dnyandeo Yashwantrao Patil (Ex-Governor of Tripura, West Bengal and Bihar). It has 1500 beds dedicated to charity, a 300-bed ICU facility (the largest in Navi Mumbai), 15 operation theatres, a 24x7 charitable casualty and trauma centre. It has a blood bank that is accredited by NABH. The hospital is one of the largest charitable hospitals in India.

== Charitable schemes ==
The hospital ran various charitable schemes such as Rajeev Gandhi Jeevandayee Yojana and Dnyan-Pushpa arogya Yojana.

=== Dnyan-Pushpa Arogya Yojana ===
Medical facilities in Mumbai are expensive. Dnyan-Pushpa Yojana was the brainchild of Dr. Vijay D. Patil. Under this scheme poor patients with income less than 1 lakh rupees or those who have an orange ration card use to get free treatment without any delay or requirements of multiple clearances. Under this scheme all eye procedures, natural deliveries, and 20 surgical procedures per day were done free of cost. The patient need not be a resident of Mumbai. The patient only needed a ration card and/or Aadhar card. This scheme has benefited patients hailing from many states of India.

=== Rajeev Gandhi Jeevandayee Yojana ===
This scheme gives access to Below Poverty Line (BPL) and Above Poverty Line (APL) families (excluding White Card Holders as defined by Civil Supplies Department) to medical care for services requiring hospitalization for surgery and therapies or consultations by health care providers.

Rajiv Gandhi Jeevandayee Arogya Yojana (RGJAY) has been gradually rolled out in Maharashtra state over 3 years. The insurance policy/coverage under the RGJAY is for eligible families from all the 35 districts of Maharashtra.
