= Bhalchandra Nilkanth Purandare =

Indian gynaecologist

Dr. Bhalchandra Nilkanth Purandare
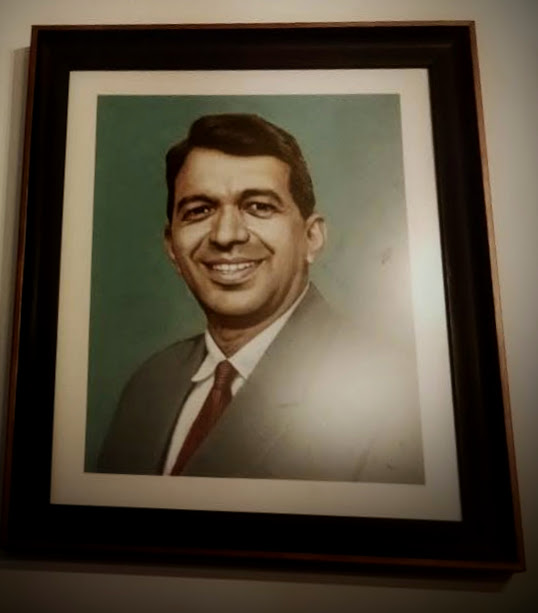
- Born: 27 October 1911; India
- Died: 10 November 1990
- Occupation: Gynecologist
- Parent: Nilkanth Anant Purandare
- Awards: Padma Bhushan

Dr. Bhalchandra Nilkanth Purandare (27 October 1911 – 10 November 1990), was an Indian gynaecologist. He was the son of Dr. Nilkanth Anant Purandare (Also known as 'Father of Indian Obstetric and Gynaecology'). He was the director of the Dr. N.A. Purandare Medical Centre for Family Welfare and Research, Mumbai. He served as the president of the International Federation of Gynecology and Obstetrics (FIGO) from 1973 to 1976 and the Mumbai Obstetric and Gynecological Society (MOGS) from 1966 to 1968. He was an honorary fellow of the Royal College of Obstetricians and Gynaecologists and an elected fellow of the National Academy of Medical Sciences (1961). The Government of India awarded him the third highest civilian honour of the Padma Bhushan, in 1972, for his contributions to medicine. His brother Dr. Vithal N. Purandare was also an acclaimed obstetrician and gynaecologist, renowned for his surgical prowess. He served as President of the Mumbai Obstetrics and Gynecology society(1973–1975) and FOGSI President in 1981. Their nephew Dr. C. N. Purandare, is a prominent gynaecologist and an ex President of FIGO.

He died on 10 November 1990 at the age of 80.

He authored his autobiography in Marathi titled 'Shalyakaushalya' (शल्यकौशल्य).
