= BCG disease outbreak in Finland in the 2000s =

Adverse effect of the Bacillus Calmette-Guérin vaccine

BCG disease is an adverse effect of the Bacillus Calmette-Guérin vaccine. The vaccine contains living Mycobacterium bovis BCG, and in BCG disease, the bacterium causes a disease in vaccinated persons. Between 2000 and 2006, several hundred children in Finland had serious adverse reactions from the vaccine, including osteitis and osteomyelitis, disseminated (usually fatal) BCG infection, arthritis, and lymph node abscesses. Four deaths were registered in the official adverse event register, and while in only two cases a clear causal link was considered to be in place, two other cases were diagnosed with a disease that in scientific peer-reviewed articles (case descriptions) have been mistakenly first made, and afterward have been noticed to be disseminated BCG infections. One death with a causal link considered established by the adverse event monitoring agency was vaccinated with pre-August 2002 vaccine (Evans), while the three other registered deaths were with the new post-August 2002 vaccine (BCG vaccine SSI).

== Vaccination policy in Finland ==
Officially, vaccination policy in Finland is divided among many governmental organizations, such as the National Agency for Medicines, National Public Health Institute, the National Authority for Medicolegal Affairs, National Research and Development Centre for Welfare and Health (STAKES), the Health Department, etc. In practice, however, almost everything connected to vaccines is done with the National Public Health Institute. The NPHI also does significant research funded by outside sources—circa 40% of funding is external, and the policy is to get as much outside funding as possible. Among the biggest funders has been the vaccine giant GlaxoSmithKline between 2003 and 2005.

== History ==
In the 1970s, there was a similar outbreak of BCG osteitis osteomyelitis in Sweden and Finland, when a Swedish-Danish BCG vaccine strain was used. To resolve the issue, Sweden discontinued mass BCG vaccinations to newborns, and Finland switched to a different strain.

=== Beginning of the outbreak ===
In August 2002, the BCG vaccine used in Finland was discontinued by the manufacturer after factory inspectors were dissatisfied with the manufacturing process. Finland switched to a Danish-strain BCG vaccine that did not have marketing authorization in Finland. Despite a lack of marketing authorization, the vaccine was offered and recommended to all Finnish newborns (circa 55,000–60,000 per year), and parents were not told the vaccine had no marketing authorization, as required by Finnish and European Union legislation. The vaccine was injected into the thigh of newborns, despite clear manufacturer instructions that it should be administered to the upper arm, and despite the manufacturer's warning that injecting into a lower limb was associated with a greater number of adverse effects.

=== Publicity and continued vaccinations ===
Severe adverse effects were noticed in the media already in the spring of 2003, and on 27 May 2003, a grandmother also working in the medical trade called for the discontinuation of vaccinations. However, these continued as before, and representatives from the National Public Health Institute of Finland as well an expert group set by NPHI responded on 3 June 2003 that there was no need to change the recommendation concerning vaccinations. In fact, already in December 2002 a decision had been made to actively move towards vaccinating only those newborns at special risk for tuberculosis.

=== Resolving the issue ===
While the National Public Health Institute of Finland was prepared to let the vaccine be administered to all newborns until the beginning of 2008, mass inoculations were discontinued on 1 September 2006 after a draft report by the Finnish Lung Health Association (Filha ry), which clearly stated that the vaccine does more harm than good for that specific population.

=== Aftermath ===
On 4 January 2009, the vaccine information association Rokotusinfo ry issued a media release saying that it had requested the police to investigate whether crimes had been committed relating to the use of the BCG vaccine.
