= Eino Kulonen =

Finnish physician (1921–1984)

Eino Kulonen (October 24, 1921 – September 17, 1984) was a Finnish physician and scientist.

Kulonen was born in Kiikka in Pirkanmaa. He earned his D.Med.Sc. degree in 1951 and held the position of docent at the University of Helsinki from 1953 to 1954. From 1955 to 1984, he was professor of medicinal chemistry at the University of Turku. His research involved the chemistry and structure of connective tissue, as well as the effects of alcohol on the nerve system.

In 1969, he became the first recipient of the Matti Äyräpää Prize.
