= Pekka Huttunen =

Finnish politician

Kalle Petter (Pekka) Huttunen (2 August 1871, Rantasalmi — 24 November 1932, Petrozavodsk) was a Finnish tenant farmer and politician. He was a member of the Parliament of Finland from 1907 to 1918, representing the Social Democratic Party of Finland (SDP). During the Finnish Civil War Huttunen sided with the Reds, and after the collapse of the Finnish Socialist Workers' Republic he fled to Soviet Russia. He later settled in the Karelian ASSR.
