= Ajeenkya Patil =

Indian educationist

Dr. Ajeenkya D. Y. Patil
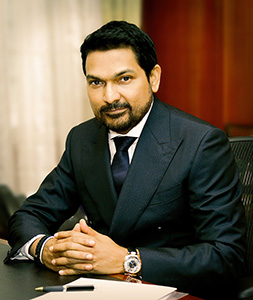
- Born: Mumbai, India
- Education: Richmond College, U.K. London School of Economics
- Occupations: Businessman, Educationist
- Parent(s): D. Y. Patil; Pushpalata Patil
- Website: www.adypg.com/chairman.html

Ajeenkya D Y Patil is an Indian educationist and economist. He is the son of D. Y. Patil. He is Chairman of the D. Y. Patil Group, President of Ajeenkya D. Y. Patil University and Pro-chancellor of the Dr. D. Y. Patil University.

== Early life and education ==
Ajeenkya D Y Patil was born in Mumbai, the son of Pushpalata Patil and D. Y. Patil, a Padma Shri recipient, and founder of the D Y Patil Group. After his initial schooling and graduation, Patil did his MBA from Richmond College, UK and specialization in Marketing from the London School of Economics. He has been awarded an honorary doctorate by University of Central Lancashire, United Kingdom, for his achievements in the field of education.

== Career ==
Ajeenkya Patil was appointed as Chairman of CII Western Region Sub Committee on Education in March 2016. He has also served as Chairman of the Central Board for Workers Education (CBWE) by Ministry of Labour, Government of India. Patil has been appointed as Honorary Consul of the Republic of Guyana by the Government of Guyana. He stood for the 2014 elections in the Karad south assembly constituency against the then Chief Minister of Maharashtra, Shri Prithviraj Chavan. Patil was honoured with the Budhbhushan Jeevan Gaurav Award. He has also been conferred as the “Times Men of the Year 2018” He was given the Best Leader and Best Brand Award 2019, by India's 100 Greatest Brand & Leaders which is an IPR-based (Intellectual Property Rights) award.

Ajeenkya D Y Patil University, Pune has been established under Maharashtra Govt. Act of 2015 of Government of Maharashtra. The undergraduate and graduate programs under this university are automobile designing, digital modelling, engineering, management, media and communication, architecture, filmmaking and law. It is situated in D Y Patil Knowledge City, Pune.

== Posts held ==
Position	Organization
Chairman	D Y Patil Group
Chancellor	Ajeenkya D Y Patil University
Pro-Chancellor	Padmashree Dr D Y Patil University
Vice President	D Y Patil Educational Academy
President	Ramrao Adik Education Society
