= Jussi Huttunen =

Finnish physician

Professor Jussi Kalervo Huttunen (1941 - 2023 Helsinki) was a physician (1966 University of Helsinki), scientist, and former director general of the National Public Health Institute of Finland (1978-2003). He was an internist by training, and served as associate professor of internal medicine at the University of Kuopio 1975–1978. As the first director general of the reformed (1982) National Public Health Institute he guided the institute from previously routine microbiological and clinical chemistry laboratory to an internationally recognized research institute in public health.

Throughout his career Huttunen was involved in many different organisations, and he was a well-known health care expert often consulted by the government as well as by international and local authorities. He served as an acting director general and department chief at the Ministry of Social Welfare and Health (2000-2001). One of the longest activities was in the Finnish Medical Association Duodecim: he acted several years as editor of its journal Duodecim, and in several positions in the activities including presidency of the Association (1996-1999). He was president of the Finnish Diabetes Research Foundation (1985-1991), Finnish Cancer Research Foundation (1989-1990), Finnish Cancer Association (1992-1995), and Finnish Heart Association (1998-2003), among others. International assignments included presidency of the Governing Council of the International Agency for Research on Cancer (IARC, 1990-1992), Nordic Cancer Union (1991), and vice presidency of a committee evaluating the Framework Programs of the European Union (2008). He belonged to editorial boards of several international scientific journals and was editor of Annals of Clinical Research (1984-1989).

Huttunen started his research career as medical biochemist, and presented his dissertation for doctor of medical sciences degree on sugar metabolism (1966). Subsequently, his interests were in important national diseases such as cardiovascular diseases and diabetes, as well as nutrition. Even as director general he was actively involved in epidemiological studies on cardiovascular and metabolic diseases. He was also concerned on great health differences between social groups. He held honorary doctorate in medicine from the University of Kuopio (2000) and many other honours.
