= North Karelia Project =

Public health initiative in Finland

The North Karelia Project was worldwide the first public health project for the prevention of cardiovascular disease mortality. It was first conducted from 1972 to 1977 in North Karelia and due to the success from 1977 to 1997 in all of Finland. It addressed the three risk factors (smoking, serum cholesterol and blood pressure) identified by the British Doctors Study, the Framingham Heart Study, and the Seven Countries Study.

Between 1972 and 2012 cardiovascular disease mortality for working age men declined by 82% and for working age women declined 84%. The life expectancy of the entire population increased by 7 years. Two-thirds of the mortality decline is attributable to the impact of the North Karelia Project.

== The Project ==
North Karelia, a region in Finland, had at that time according to the Seven Countries Study, the highest rate of cardiovascular disease in the world and a particularly low life expectancy for the male population. This was astonishing since the majority of the population conducted heavy forest or farmwork and should have had benefits from physical activity. The problem prompted public pressure for the authorities to act to increase health and life expectancy in the region. From 1972 to 1977, the North Karelia Project was started involving the National Public Health Institute of Finland, the Office of the North Karelia County Physician, the Finnish Heart Association, North Karelia Central Hospital, and the Martha Organization. The initiator was Martti J. Karvonen, an expert in cardiovascular health and the leader of the Finland arm of the Seven Countries Study. The co-leader was Pekka Puska.

It was worldwide the first public health project for the prevention of cardiovascular disease mortality. Large epidemiological studies, such as the British Doctors Study, the Framingham Heart Study, and the Seven Countries Study, identified factors associated with the disease risk, particularly tobacco smoking, high serum cholesterol, and high blood pressure. The aim of the North Karelia Project was to reduce the levels of the three main CVD risk factors through behavioral change promoted by community action and participation. Systematic population-based risk factor monitoring has been conducted by risk factor surveys every 5 years.

The dietary habits of the population resulted in high intakes of saturated fat, very little polyunsaturated fat, little vegetables, and much salt. This was understood as the main reason for the high cholesterol and blood pressure levels. The core interventions was advice on the replacement of saturated fats (mainly butter) with unsaturated fats (mainly rapeseed oil), higher vegetable consumption, less salt and less tobacco consumption. The intake of saturated fats through food were reduced from 20% of energy intake to 12% in 2007. From 2007 to 2012 there was a rebound to 14% of energy intake.

The average serum cholesterol level was reduced by 20%.

	1972	1979	1982	1987	1992	1997
Smoking % of population (Men)	52.6%	46.6%	41.7%	40.5%	36.8%	33.3%
Serum cholesterol (mmol/l) (Men)	6.77	6.52	6.26	6.23	5.91	5.70
Systolic blood pressure (mm Hg) (Men)	147.1	144.2	145.5	144.0	140.7	138.8
Smoking % of population (Woman)	11.4%	12.7%	16.3%	17.3%	21.3%	17.9%
Serum cholesterol (mmol/l) (Woman)	6.69	6.34	6.04	5.92	5.55	5.54
Systolic blood pressure (mm Hg) (Woman)	149.2	141.6	141.6	138.1	134.6	132.6

Because of its great success, since 1977 the work in North Karelia also served as a national demonstration. There was a lot of media coverage on a national level, as well as a national television course between 1978 und 1991.

== Results ==
The rate of deaths from cardiovascular disease in working age men (between 35 and 64 years of age) was reduced by more than 80% (from 690 per 100,000 annually to 100 per 100,000 annually). The life expectancy of the entire population increased by 7 years and surveys also showed an improvement in subjective health perceptions.

- About two-thirds of the Coronary artery disease mortality reduction that was observed between 1972 and 2012 was to be expected by changes in the three risk factors the project addressed. In men most of the mortality decline was due to reduction in serum cholesterol levels while in women reductions in serum cholesterol and systolic blood pressure levels contributed equally to the mortality decline.
- The remaining one-third of mortality reduction may be explained by other factors like diet and physical activity, improvement in secondary prevention and medical advances. For example new secondary prevention guidelines were introduced in the 1980s which included active drug treatment (aspirin, beta-blockers, angiotensin-converting enzyme inhibitors, and, later on statins).

	1979	1982	1987	1992	1997	2002	2007	2012
Observed mortality decline (Men)	17%	25%	38%	55%	67%	75%	78%	82%
Predicted mortality decline (Men)	16,5%	25,4%	28,5%	41,3%	48,5%	50,2%	55,7%	56,8%
Observed mortality decline (Woman)	28%	41%	45%	59%	72%	77%	79%	84%
Predicted mortality decline (Woman)	23,7%	28,1%	35,5%	44,7%	49,8%	51,5%	53,5%	55,7%

There was a bit of a shortcoming since later on a few other risk factors, such as physical inactivity, obesity, and elevated blood glucose (leading to diabetes) have been identified. Those were not addressed and observed by the project. Physical inactivity was seldom in the 1970s but became a major problem later on. The mean body mass index increased somewhat during the centuries but this is not expected to affect the results markedly, since the effect of obesity on coronary artery disease risk is largely mediated through its effect on blood pressure and blood pressure was observed by the project.
