= Dana Dabelea =

Epidemiologist

- Born: Romania
- Occupation: Epidemiologist

Dana Dabelea is the Conrad M. Riley Distinguished Professor of epidemiology at the University of Colorado Anschutz Medical Campus. She is known for her work on how both internal and external factors can influence how diabetes and obesity develops within individuals.

== Education and career ==
Dabelea obtained her M.D. in 1990 and her Ph.D. in 1997 from the University of Medicine and Pharmacy in Timișoara, Romania. She completed a postdoctoral fellowship in diabetes epidemiology and field studies at the National Institutes of Health in Phoenix, Arizona.

Dabelea joined the University of Colorado School of Medicine in 2001 and was promoted to full professor in 2011. She was named the Conrad M. Riley Distinguished Professor in 2013. Other honors include the Elizabeth Gee Memorial Lectureship Award from the University of Colorado and the American Diabetes Association Kelly West Award, both presented in 2017

Dabelea is known for her work on pediatric obesity, diabetes, life course epidemiology, and Native American health. Her early research focused on diabetes research within the Pima Indians population. She has studied type 2 diabetes rates specifically in children as well as diabetes in pregnant women. In research of diabetes rates across populations, she determined that non-Hispanic whites have the highest rates of type I diabetes.

== Selected publications ==
- Dabelea, D; Hanson, R L; Lindsay, R S; Pettitt, D J; Imperatore, G; Gabir, M M; Roumain, J; Bennett, P H; Knowler, W C (2000-12-01). "Intrauterine exposure to diabetes conveys risks for type 2 diabetes and obesity: a study of discordant sibships". Diabetes. 49 (12): 2208–2211. doi:10.2337/diabetes.49.12.2208. ISSN 0012-1797. PMID 11118027.
- Dabelea, Dana; Snell-Bergeon, Janet K.; Hartsfield, Cynthia L.; Bischoff, Kimberly J.; Hamman, Richard F.; McDuffie, Robert S. (2005-03-01). "Increasing Prevalence of Gestational Diabetes Mellitus (GDM) Over Time and by Birth Cohort: Kaiser Permanente of Colorado GDM Screening Program". Diabetes Care. 28 (3): 579–584. doi:10.2337/diacare.28.3.579. ISSN 0149-5992. PMID 15735191.
- Cornier, Marc-Andre; Dabelea, Dana; Hernandez, Teri L.; Lindstrom, Rachel C.; Steig, Amy J.; Stob, Nicole R.; Van Pelt, Rachael E.; Wang, Hong; Eckel, Robert H. (2008-12-01). "The Metabolic Syndrome". Endocrine Reviews. 29 (7): 777–822. doi:10.1210/er.2008-0024. ISSN 0163-769X. PMC 5393149. PMID 18971485.
- Dabelea, Dana; Mayer-Davis, Elizabeth J.; Saydah, Sharon; Imperatore, Giuseppina; Linder, Barbara; Divers, Jasmin; Bell, Ronny; Badaru, Angela; Talton, Jennifer W.; Crume, Tessa; Liese, Angela D.; Merchant, Anwar T.; Lawrence, Jean M.; Reynolds, Kristi; Dolan, Lawrence (2014-05-07). "Prevalence of Type 1 and Type 2 Diabetes Among Children and Adolescents From 2001 to 2009". JAMA. 311 (17): 1778–1786. doi:10.1001/jama.2014.3201. ISSN 0098-7484. PMC 4368900. PMID 24794371.
