= International Journal of Gynecology & Obstetrics =

- Discipline: Obstetrics and gynecology
- Language: English
- Edited by: Richard Mawuena Kofi Adanu

Publication details
- Former name(s): Journal of the International Federation of Gynaecology and Obstetrics
- History: 1963–present
- Publisher: Wiley-Blackwell
- Frequency: Monthly
- Impact factor: 4.447 (2021)

Standard abbreviations
- ISO 4: Int. J. Gynecol. Obstet.

Indexing
- CODEN: IJGOAL
- ISSN: 0020-7292
- OCLC no.: 20761200

Links
- Journal homepage; Online access; Online archive

The International Journal of Gynecology & Obstetrics is a monthly peer-reviewed medical journal covering obstetrics and gynecology. It was established in 1963 as the Journal of the International Federation of Gynecology and Obstetrics, obtaining its current name in 1969. It is published by Wiley-Blackwell on behalf of the International Federation of Gynecology and Obstetrics, of which it is the official journal. The editor-in-chief is Prof Michael Geary (Rotunda Hospital, Ireland). According to the Journal Citation Reports, the journal has a 2021 impact factor of 4.447.
