= Leena Peltonen-Palotie =

Finnish geneticist

- Born: 16 June 1952; Helsinki, Finland
- Died: 11 March 2010 (aged 57); Helsinki, Finland
- Citizenship: Finland
- Education: University of Oulu
- Scientific career
- Fields: Molecular geneticist
- Workplaces: University of Oulu, National Public Health Institute of Finland, UCLA Department of Human Genetics, Academy of Finland, Wellcome Trust Sanger Institute, Orion Corporation

Leena Peltonen-Palotie (16 June 1952 – 11 March 2010) was a Finnish geneticist who contributed to the identification of 15 genes for Finnish heritage diseases, including arterial hypertension, schizophrenia, lactose intolerance, arthrosis and multiple sclerosis. She was considered one of the world's leading molecular geneticists.

== Biography ==
Peltonen-Palotie was born in Helsinki, but her family moved to Oulu when she was five years old. She completed her secondary education at the Finnish Co-educational Lycée of Oulu, graduating in 1971. Peltonen-Palotie went on to study medicine, receiving her Licentiate of Medicine degree in 1976, and completed her doctoral thesis at the University of Oulu in 1978.

Peltonen-Palotie worked at the National Public Health Institute of Finland from 1987 to 1998. From 1998 to 2002 she helped found the UCLA Department of Human Genetics. She had a professorial position in the Academy of Finland since 2003. In April 2005 Peltonen-Palotie was employed at the University of Helsinki and the National Public Health Institute of Finland. She was also the project director for the EU project GenomEUtwin that was formed to define and characterize the genetic components in the background of different diseases. In 2004 she became a member of the Board of Directors of Orion Corporation, the largest Finnish pharmaceutical company. In September 2007, Peltonen-Palotie joined the Wellcome Trust Sanger Institute as the head of Human Genetics. She also headed research groups at the Broad Institute of MIT and Harvard University.

Peltonen-Palotie published over 500 research articles and almost 80 invited articles, and mentored over 70 PhD students in her career.

She died on 11 March 2010 at age 57 from bone cancer.

== Awards and honours ==
- In addition to many academic awards she received an honorary degree from the Faculty of Medicine at University of Uppsala in 2000, and the University of Joensuu.
- In 2004, the Finnish television show Suuret suomalaiset listed Peltonen-Palotie as 77th of the 100 greatest Finns of all time.
- In 2006, Peltonen-Palotie was awarded the Belgian Prix van Gysel and the Swedish Stora Fernströmpriset prizes. In 2009, she was awarded the Finnish honorary title of Academician of Science.
- On International Women's Day 2010, her achievements were honored in the form of a commemorative postage stamp issued by the Finnish Post.
- The Leena Peltonen Prize for Excellence in Human Genetics is named in her honor.
