= D. Y. Patil =

Indian politician (1935–2026)

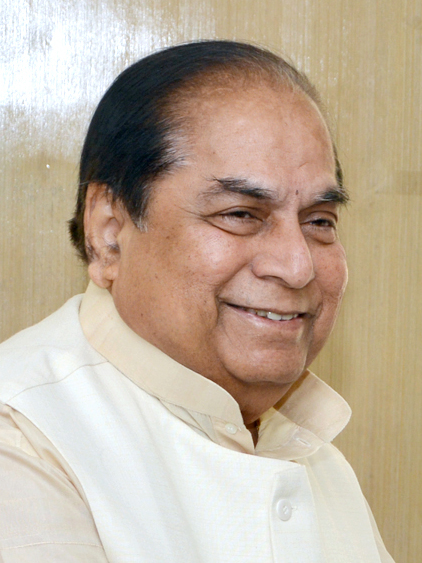
- Patil in 2014

Governor of West Bengal (Additional charge)
- In office 3 July 2014 – 17 July 2014
- Preceded by: M. K. Narayanan
- Succeeded by: Keshari Nath Tripathi

Governor of Bihar
- In office 22 March 2013 – 26 November 2014
- Preceded by: Devanand Konwar
- Succeeded by: Keshari Nath Tripathi (additional charge)

Governor of Tripura
- In office 27 November 2009 – 21 March 2013
- Preceded by: Kamla Beniwal
- Succeeded by: Devanand Konwar

Member of Maharashtra Legislative Assembly
- In office 1967–1978
- Preceded by: Sadashiva Daulatrao Patil
- Succeeded by: Yeshwant Eknath Patil
- Constituency: Panhala Vidhan Sabha

Personal details
- Born: Dnyandeo Yashwantrao Patil; 22 October 1935 Ambap, Kolhapur State, India
- Died: 4 August 2026 (aged 90) Kolhapur, Maharashtra, India
- Party: Nationalist Congress Party
- Other political affiliations: Indian National Congress (until 2018)
- Spouse(s): Shantadevi; Pushpalata
- Children: 9; including Vijay D. Patil, Ajeenkya and Satej
- Relatives: Ruturaj Patil (grandson)
- Awards: Padma Shri
- Website: Official Website

Dnyandeo Yashwantrao Patil alias Dadasaheb (22 October 1935 – 4 August 2026) was an Indian politician who served as the Governor of Bihar, West Bengal and Tripura. He was a leader of the Indian National Congress from Maharashtra state. He received the Padma Shri award in 1991 for social work. On 24 December 2018, he joined the Nationalist Congress Party.

== Early life ==
Patil was born at Ambap village in the present-day Kolhapur district.

== Educational institutions founded ==
A number of educational institutions were founded by him, which include:

- D. Y. Patil Institute of Master of Computer Applications and Management, Akurdi, Pune
- Dr. D. Y. Patil Vidyapeeth, Pune
- Padmashree D. Y. Patil Vidyapeeth, Navi Mumbai
- Dr. D. Y. Patil Law college Pune
- Dr. D. Y. Patil Medical College Navi Mumbai
- D. Y. Patil Education Society, Kolhapur
- Dr. D. Y. Patil Sports Academy
- Dr. D. Y. Patil Knowledge City in Pune
- Dr. D. Y Patil International School, Mumbai
- D. Y. Patil International School, Nagpur
- Dr. DY Patil International School, Kangra (Himachal Pradesh)
- D. Y. Patil college of Engineering and Technology, Kolhapur
- D. Y. Patil Medical College, Kolhapur
- Dr. D.Y. Patil College of Engineering, Pune
- D Y Patil Hospital, Mumbai
- D. Y. Patil International School - Worli (Mumbai), Nerul (Navi Mumbai), and Pune
- Dr. D.Y. Patil Junior College, Pune
- DYPDC Center for Automotive Research and Studies
- Dr. DY Patil Pushpalata Patil International School, Patna
- Dr. DY Patil B-school, Pune
- Dr. D. Y. Patil Biotechnology & Bioinformatics Institute, Pune
- D Y Patil International University, Akurdi, Pune

The D. Y. Patil Medical College conducts the costliest Bachelor of Medicine, Bachelor of Surgery course in India.

== Political and public service career ==
Patil was elected to the Kolhapur Municipal Council as a Congress candidate in 1957 and remained in office until 1962. He was the member of the Maharashtra Vidhan Sabha from 1967 to 1978. In both the 1967 and 1972 elections, he was elected from Panhala Vidhan Sabha constituency. He was appointed the Governor of Tripura state on 21 November 2009 and took the oath of office and secrecy on 27 November 2009. He was appointed the Governor of Bihar on 9 March 2012.

== Death ==
Patil died after a long illness at his home in Kolhapur, Maharashtra, on 4 August 2026, at the age of 90.
