= Federation of Obstetric and Gynaecological Societies of India =

Logo

The Federation of Obstetric and Gynaecological Societies of India (FOGSI) is a professional organization representing practitioners of obstetrics and gynecology in India. With 262 member societies and over 37,000 individual members spread over the length and breadth of the country, FOGSI is probably one of the largest membership based organizations of specialized professionals.

== History ==
FOGSI came into formal existence in Madras on January 6, 1950, at the sixth All India Congress of Obstetrics and Gynaecology, when the obstetric and gynecological societies of Ahmedabad, Bengal, Bombay, Madras and Punjab resolved to form themselves into the Federation of Obstetric and Gynaecological Societies of India. It was further resolved that the Federation be registered and headquartered in Bombay. The launch of FOGSI as the national organization of obstetricians and gynecologists followed five earlier All India Congresses, the first of these held in Madras in 1936 and organized by the then existing three obstetric and gynecological societies at Bombay, Kolkata and Madras.

The Indian College of Obstetrics and Gynecology is the academic wing of FOGSI with over 770 fellows. It was established by FOGSI on December 21, 1984, to further promote the education, training, research and knowledge in obstetrics, gynecology and reproductive health.

== Operations ==
FOGSI exists to encourage and disseminate knowledge, education and research in the field of obstetrics and gynecology, to pilot and promote preventive and therapeutic services related to the practice of obstetrics and gynecology for betterment of the health of women and children in particular and the wellbeing of the community in general, to advocate the cause of reproductive health and rights and to support and protect the interest of practitioners of obstetrics and gynecology in India.

The Journal of Obstetrics and Gynecology of India is the official publication of FOGSI and is published bimonthly and circulated to every individual member. It contains articles and contributions on fundamental research and clinical practice as also case reports of clinical interest. With www.fogsi.org the official website, FOGSI has an important presence in cyberspace which works to promote and fulfill the aims and objectives of the Federation.

The Federation continues to hold the All India Congress of Obstetrics and Gynaecology, its annual conference in January for four days. FOGSI also organizes Yuva FOGSI, four regional youth conferences to promote and showcase young talent each year. Besides these annual conferences many academic activities go on round the year throughout the country with twenty six subspecialty committees simultaneously working in their designated areas.

The Federation also collaborates with and partners the Government of India and is an invited reprehensive on all relevant policy making bodies of the government on issues related to women's health.

FOGSI has close links and affiliation with international and regional organizations like International Federation of Gynecology and Obstetrics (FIGO), AOFOG and SAFOG, with many of its members having occupied positions in these organizations from time to time.

Each year FOGSI under the guidance the President selects a theme to highlight the importance of a particular issue related to women's health. This permits focus with the involvement of the large membership.

== Leadership ==
- Dr. Hrishikesh Pai - President
- Dr. Rishma Pai - President
- Dr. Jaydeep Tank - President Elect
- Dr. S. Shantha Kumari - Immediate Past President
- Dr. Madhuri Patel - Secretary
- Dr. Suvarna Khadilkar - Deputy General Secretary
- Dr. Alka Pandey - Vice President
- Dr. Asha Baxi - Vice President
- Dr. Geetendra Sharma - Vice President
- Dr. S. Sampathkumari - Vice President
- Dr. Yashodhara Pradeep - Vice President
- Dr. Parikshit Tank - Treasurer
- Dr. Niranjan Chavan - Joint Treasurer
- Dr. Manisha Takhtani - Joint Secretary

== Prizes and awards ==
The FOGSI presents various prizes and awards annually during the AICOG conferences. They are:

- Mrs. Indumati Jhaveri Prizes
- Dr. C. S. Dawn Prizes
- Dr. Mrs. Jagdishwari Mishra Prizes
- Dr. C. L. Jhaveri Prizes for Miscellaneous category of Scientific Papers
- Dr. Amarendra Nath Dan Prizes for the Best Papers on MCH Care
- Mrs. Chandravati Devi Jagannath Singh Prizes for the Best Papers on Oncology
- Dr. Mrs. Siuli Rudra Prizes for the Best Papers on Endoscopy
- Mr. Karan Gupta Memorial Prizes for the Best Papers
- Bhagwato Devi Yamuna Singh Prize for the Best Papers on Geriatric Gynaecology
