= Climate Watch (Kausal Ltd.) =

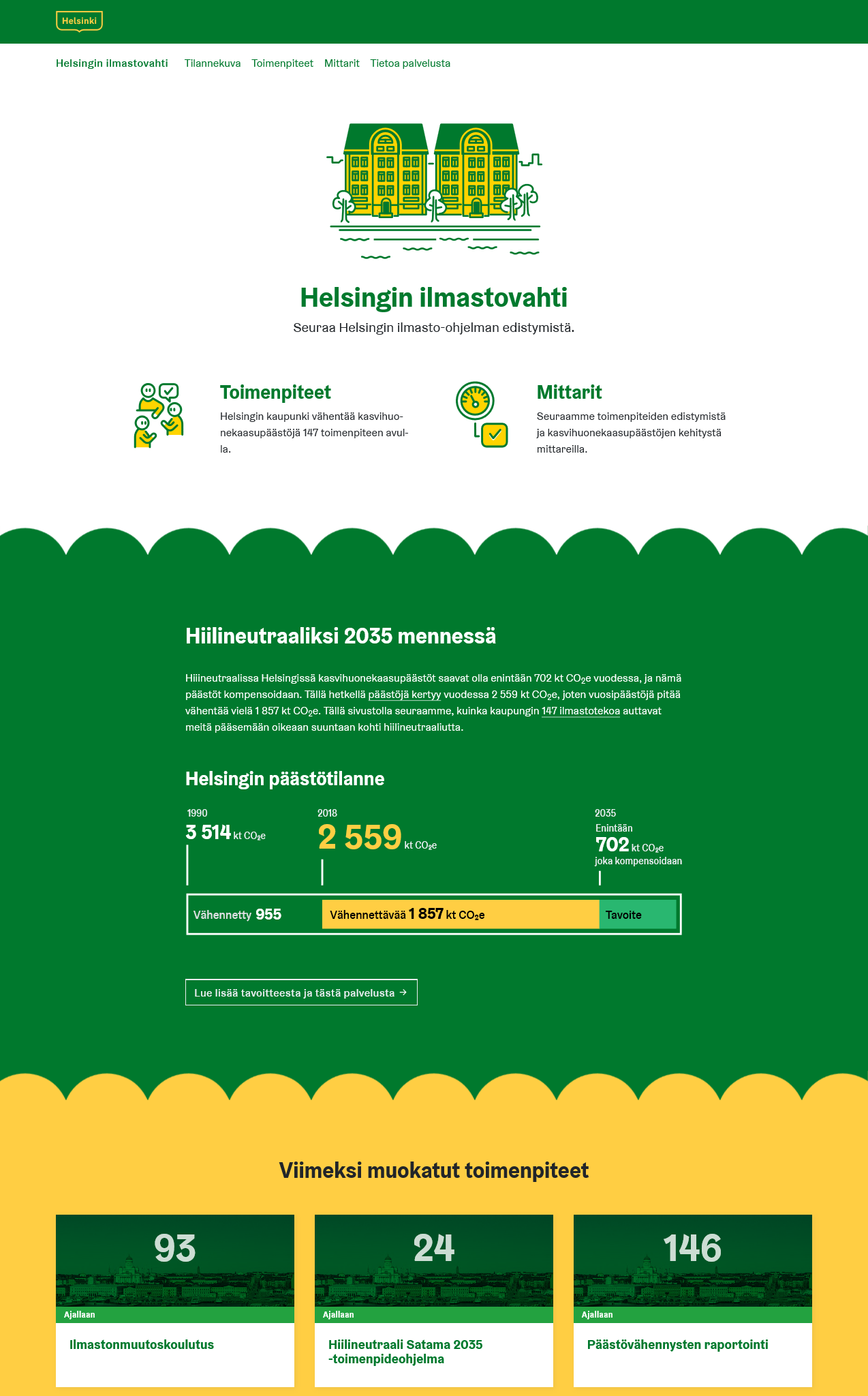
- Climate Watch
- Original author(s): Smiddy
- Developer(s): Helsinki, Kausal Ltd
- Initial release: 29 October 2019; 5 years ago
- Stable release: Helsingin ilmastovahti / 29 October 2019; 5 years ago
- Repository: Aplans Repository
- Written in: Python, JavaScript
- Platform: Django, React
- Available in: Finnish
- Type: Monitoring tool
- License: CC-BY 4.0

Climate Watch is a web tool for municipalities and other organisations for monitoring their own climate actions. Climate Watch is open source and was originally developed by the city of Helsinki. The first Climate Watch version was partly funded by EIT Climate-KIC organisation. The tool is in trial use in other organisations. Climate Watch is being developed by Kausal Ltd under the brand name Kausal Watch.

== Structure ==
The main purpose of the Climate Watch is to monitor progress of the actions in an action plan. Each action has a contact person, which adds information about tasks and events related to the action.

The impacts of actions are measured using Smiddy indicators. They are quantitative time series about some relevant phenomena that are relevant to an action. There are three kinds of indicatos: operational indicators measure a phenomenon that can directly be affected by an action. tactical indicators can only be affected indirectly. Strategic indicators measure phenomena that are of special interest, such as greenhouse gas emissions.

Every action and indicator has its own web page, where the phenomenon is described in more detail and possibly with quantitative data and objectives. The actions and indicators together form a graphical representation called insight network, where the phenomena are connected to each other with causal links. The Climate Watch also has a dashboard with a summary of the progress of the actions.

=== Technical solution ===
The backend of the Climate Watch is done with Django web framework, and its user interface is done with React JavaScript library.
