= National Public Health Institute of Finland =

Finnish research institute

The National Public Health Institute of Finland (KTL, Finnish: Kansanterveyslaitos, Swedish: Folkhälsoinstitutet) was a research and expert institute under the Ministry of Social Affairs and Health charged with the task of protecting and promoting health in Finland. KTL was founded in 1911; the final form was established in 1982 in order to promote public health in Finland.

The institution had a duty to promote health and prevent disease. KTL performed research in public health in broad sense, and monitored diseases. KTL also acquired and distributed the vaccines paid by the government.

KTL was merged on 1 January 2009 with STAKES, the National Research and Development Centre for Welfare and Health, to form a new research and development institute, the National Institute for Health and Welfare (THL). The last Director General of KTL was Pekka Puska, who was also appointed Director General of the THL.

== History ==
Initially the institute was founded to combat infectious diseases and to make and distribute serum preparations and vaccines. The early organisations were the State Serum Laboratory (1911–1947; provisional 1911–1914), the State Serum Institute (1947–1970) and the Public Health Laboratory (1970–1981). The new Act in 1982 paved way for its transformation from a practical microbiological and clinical chemistry laboratory towards a research institute specializing in public health and prevention of diseases. This development was also seen in the organisation structure; new departments in Epidemiology and Environmental Health (originally Toxicology and Environmental Hygiene) were founded. In less than 10 years the transformation led by director general Jussi Huttunen was complete, and the Institute had few routine tasks. It served the government as an expert organisation, performing internationally relevant research related to public health.

== Highlights of research at KTL ==
Top quality research at KTL included early work on interferons by Kari Cantell, research on several bacterial vaccines by Pirjo Mäkelä's group, and collaboration with the World Health Organization to promote vaccination programs in developing countries. In epidemiology and health promotion so called North Karelia Project led by Pekka Puska produced internationally well-known results in preventing cardiovascular diseases. Later several environmental health projects mostly funded by the European Commission added to international understanding of toxic dioxins in food, and outdoor fine particulate matter as well as health problems due to indoor air. Finally, mainly in 1990s, genes involved in Finnish heritage of diseases were successfully identified in Leena Peltonen-Palotie's group. KTL ranked very high among the Finnish research institutes, and was evaluated to do highly competitive and internationally relevant research. Complete lists of publications are available.

== External funding ==
External funding covered approximately 40% of all of the Institute's costs. The most important funding agencies included the Academy of Finland, National Institutes of Health (USA), and the Framework Programs of the European Commission. KTL's policy was to secure as much external funding as possible to guarantee the implementation of its action plans. KTL also did research with private funds in the fields of vaccines and nutrition. Private funding has drawn criticism from some NGOs. On the other hand, the Government and funding agencies have recommended increased collaboration with companies.

== See also ==
- BCG disease outbreak in Finland in the 2000s
- National public health institutes

== Sources ==
- A. S. Härö and V. Raunio: Seerumit aseina - vastustajina mikrobit (Sera as weapons against microbes); History of National Public Health Institute and its predecessors. Helsinki 1990 (in Finnish).
- THL home page https://web.archive.org/web/20110809061823/http://www.thl.fi/en_US/web/en/ with links to KTL pages
