= Finnish Institute for Health and Welfare =

Finnish research and expert institute

- Finnish: Terveyden ja hyvinvoinnin laitos Swedish: Institutet för hälsa och välfärd

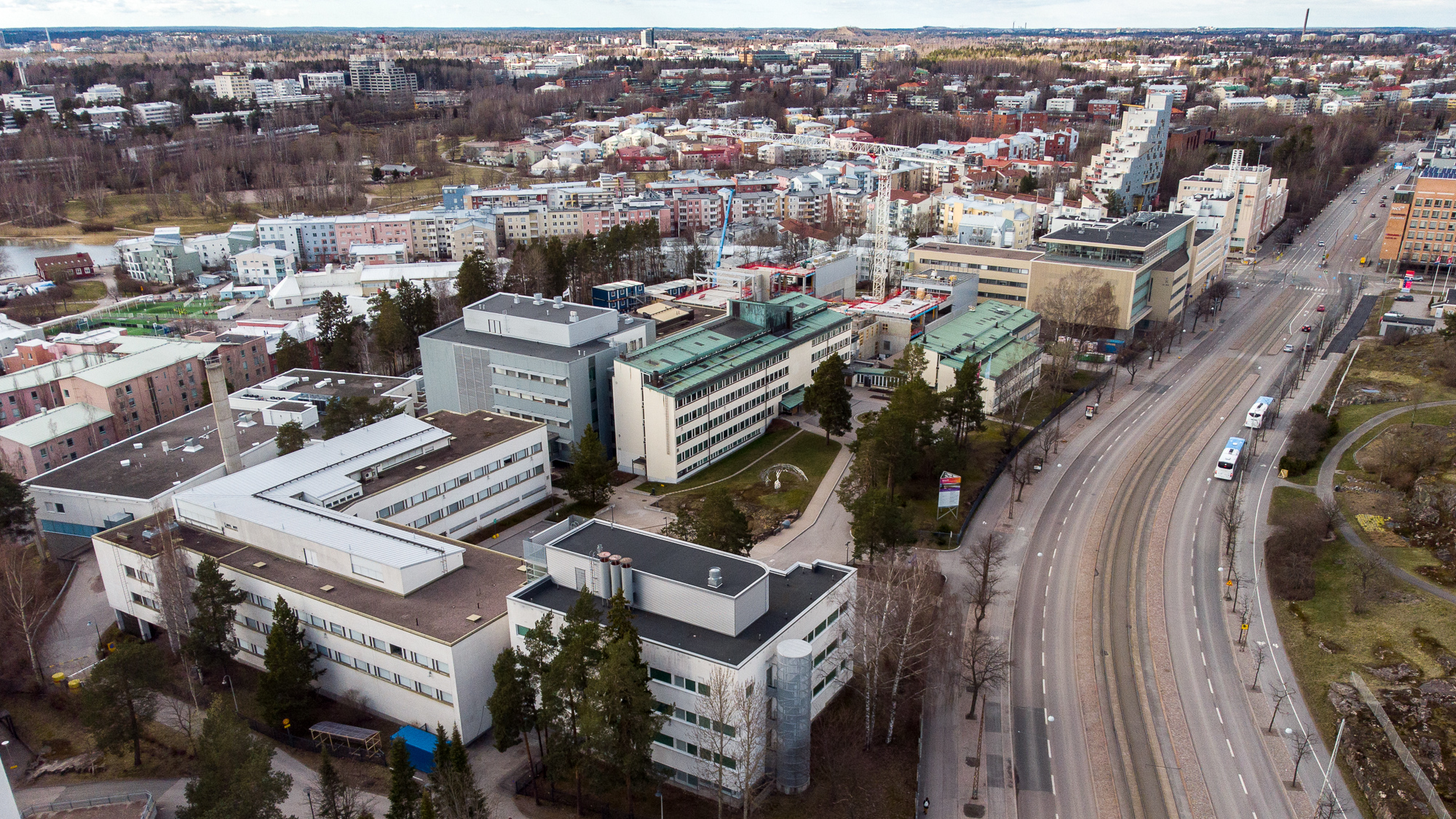

Research and development institute overview
- Formed: January 1, 2009
- Superseding agencies: National Research and Development Centre for Welfare and Health; National Public Health Institute of Finland
- Jurisdiction: Finland
- Headquarters: Helsinki; 60.2010°N 24.8980°E
- Employees: 935 person-years (2018)
- Annual budget: 109 million € (2019)
- Research and development institute executives: Markku Tervahauta, Director General; Pekka Rissanen, Assistant Director General, Knowledge and Data; Tuire Santamäki-Vuori, Director of Department (Welfare); Terhi Kilpi, Director of Department (Public Health Solutions); Mika Salminen, Director of Department (Health Security); Anu Muuri, Director of Department (Health and Social Care Systems); Anneli Pouta; Director of Department (Government Services)
- Parent department: Ministry of Social Affairs and Health
- Website: www.thl.fi

The Finnish Institute for Health and Welfare (THL, Finnish: Terveyden ja hyvinvoinnin laitos, Swedish: Institutet för hälsa och välfärd; until 2019, National Institute for Health and Welfare) is a Finnish research and development institute operating under the Ministry of Social Affairs and Health. THL was formed on 1 January 2009, with the merger of the National Public Health Institute of Finland (KTL) and the National Research and Development Centre for Welfare and Health. It is the biggest expert organisation under the ministry and its most important source of consultation regarding scientific knowledge.

== Scope of THL ==
THL's scope of activity includes both public health and social welfare. The institute aims at identifying synergy opportunities not only in the collaboration between social welfare and health care, but also in applying research and the knowledge generated with this research.

THL's field of activity includes:

- promoting the welfare and health of the population
- preventing diseases and social problems
- developing social and health care activities and services

THL's main office is located in Helsinki. The institute also has satellite offices in Kuopio, Oulu, Tampere, and Turku. THL has a total staff of about 935 person-years (2018). THL's annual budget is about 100 million euros, of which about one third comes through funding sources other than the State budget. In addition, the following State institutions are subordinate to THL: state mental hospitals (in Kuopio and Vaasa), and state residential schools.

== Organisation ==
Doctor Markku Tervahauta is the director general of THL. The deputy director general is Pekka Rissanen. The directors of the department are Tuire Santamäki-Vuori (Welfare), Terhi Kilpi (Public Health Solutions), Mika Salminen (Health Security), Anu Muuri (Health and Social Care Systems), and Anneli Pouta (Government Services).

== Functions ==
THL functions as a governmental research and development institute which has official functions based in law. Research and development are usually intertwined. Own research generates new knowledge, but also makes it easier to absorb innovations from international science networks, and the institute then applies it for new development. On the other hand, it monitors the welfare and health of the population, as well as factors causing problems, and develops and promotes measures to improve the situation. This work often leads to new research demands. Thus the aim is high-quality research maintaining close contacts to international research networks, but keeping in mind the practical applications.

THL comprises five departments. Most of the expenses are covered by the Government through state budget, but about a third of activities are paid from other sources, mainly competed research funding. Important sources are the Academy of Finland, Tekes – the Finnish Funding Agency for Technology and Innovation, Framework Programs of the European Union, National Institutes of Health (USA), and ministries through their own budgets. Total budget for 2010 was about €94 million, 68% from the State budget, 27% from outside funding sources, and 5% from chargeable services.

The predecessors of THL have been responsible for vaccinations in Finland for almost a century (see National Public Health Institute of Finland). THL is active in research on vaccines, and also gives recommendations to the ministry to acquire vaccines for the public vaccination programs, monitors adverse events of vaccines, maintains certain statistics and so on. THL also does contract work for pharmaceutical and food industries. A partial source of income is clinical vaccine trials, including funds from the vaccine manufacturer GlaxoSmithKline. The legality of THL's close ties with vaccine manufactures was questioned by some parents and NGOs after unexpected side effects of H1N1 "swine flu" vaccines in 2009 and 2010. The case was investigated by the Justice Chancellor of Finland, and no wrongdoings were found. Moreover, the Government and funding agencies have encouraged increased collaboration with companies.

== International relations ==
THL is international, and engages in extensive international co-operation. There is expert collaboration and national participation e.g. in the United Nations and UN authorities (World Health Organization), European Union (DG SANCO, ECDC), and many international associations (e.g. IANPHI). The researchers of the institute are active in many scientific organisations, there are global activities in health and welfare, European and Nordic collaboration, and co-operation with neighbouring areas.

== Sources ==
- Official website
