= Sadashivrao Dadoba Mandlik =

Indian politician (1934–2015)

Member of Parliament, Lok Sabha
- In office 4 March 1998 – 17 May 2014
- Preceded by: Udaysingrao Gaikwad
- Succeeded by: Dhananjay Mahadik
- Constituency: Kolhapur (Lok Sabha constituency)

Member of Maharashtra Legislative Assembly
- In office 1972–1978
- Preceded by: Daulatrao Appaji Nikam
- Succeeded by: Raje Vikramsinh Ghatge
- Constituency: Kagal (Vidhan Sabha constituency)
- In office 1985–1999
- Preceded by: Raje Vikramsinh Ghatge
- Succeeded by: Hasan Mushrif
- Constituency: Kagal (Vidhan Sabha constituency)

Personal details
- Born: 7 October 1934 Kolhapur, Maharashtra, India
- Died: 10 March 2015 (aged 80)
- Party: INC, NCP, Shiv sena
- Spouse: Late Vijay Mala
- Children: Sanjay Mandlik (Son)
- As of 16 September Source

Sadashivrao Dadoba Mandlik (7 October 1934 – 10 March 2015) was a member of the 15th Lok Sabha of India from Kolhapur. He was a member of the Nationalist Congress Party (NCP) political party.

He served as a member of the 12th Lok Sabha, 13th Lok Sabha and 14th Lok Sabha. He also won the Kagal constituency three times in Maharashtra Legislative Assembly elections during 1985, 1990 and 1995.
