= Chandgad Assembly constituency =

Constituency of the Maharashtra legislative assembly in India

Coordinates: 15.95°N 74.18°E

Chandgad
- Constituency No. 271 for the Maharashtra Legislative Assembly

Constituency details
- Country: India
- Region: Western India
- State: Maharashtra
- District: Kolhapur
- Lok Sabha constituency: Kolhapur
- Established: 1951
- Total electors: 329,791
- Reservation: None

Member of Legislative Assembly
- 15th Maharashtra Legislative Assembly
- Incumbent Shivaji Patil
- Party: IND
- Alliance: NDA
- Elected year: 2024

Chandgad Assembly constituency is one of the 288 Vidhan Sabha (legislative assembly) constituencies in Maharashtra state in western India.

== Overview ==
Chandgad (constituency number 271) is one of the ten Vidhan Sabha constituencies located in the Kolhapur district. This constituency covers the entire Chandgad tehsil and parts of the Ajara and Gadhinglaj tehsils of this district.

Chandgad is part of the Kolhapur Lok Sabha constituency along with five other Vidhan Sabha segments in this district, namely Radhanagari, Kagal, Kolhapur South, Karvir and Kolhapur North.

== Members of the Legislative Assembly ==
Year	Member	Party
1951	Vitthal Sitaram Patil	Peasants and Workers Party
1957	Bhujang Narsing Patil	Peasants and Workers Party
1962	Vithalrao Chavan Patil	Indian National Congress
1967	Vithalrao Chavan Patil	Indian National Congress
1972	Vasantrao Abasaheb Desai	Indian National Congress
1978	Vithalrao Bhairu Patil	Independent
1980	Vithalrao Chavan Patil	Indian National Congress (I)
1985	Vithalrao Chavan Patil	Indian National Congress
1990	Narsingrao Gurunath Patil	Indian National Congress
1995	Bharmu Subarao Patil	Independent
1999	Narsingrao Gurunath Patil	Nationalist Congress Party
2004	Narsingrao Gurunath Patil	Jan Surajya Shakti
2009	Krishnarao Rakhamajirao Desai Alias Babasaheb Kupekar	Nationalist Congress Party
2013^	Sandhyadevi Krishnarao Desai Kupekar	Nationalist Congress Party
2014	Sandhyadevi Krishnarao Desai Kupekar	Nationalist Congress Party
2019	Rajesh Narasingrao Patil	Nationalist Congress Party
2024	Shivaji Patil	Independent

== Election results ==
=== Assembly Election 2024 ===
2024 Maharashtra Legislative Assembly election : Chandgad
Party	Candidate	Votes	%	±%
IND	Shivaji Shattupa Patil	84,254	34.10%	New
NCP	Rajesh Narasingrao Patil	60,120	24.33%	New
NCP-SP	Nandini alias Nandatai Kupekar - Babhulkar	47,259	19.13%	New
Independent	Appi Alias Vinayak Virgonda Patil	24,582	9.95%	New
JSS	Mansing Ganpati Khorate	22,107	8.95%	▲3.43
NOTA	None of the Above	979	0.40%	▼0.42
Margin of victory		24,134	9.77%	▲7.76
Turnout		2,48,064	75.22%	▲6.84
Total valid votes		2,47,085		
Registered electors		3,29,791		▲2.64
Independent gain from NCP		Swing	▲8.70	

=== Assembly Election 2019 ===
2019 Maharashtra Legislative Assembly election : Chandgad
Party	Candidate	Votes	%	±%
NCP	Rajesh Narasingrao Patil	55,558	25.40%	▲1.55
Independent	Shivaji Shattupa Patil	51,173	23.39%	New
VBA	Appi Alias Vinayak Virgonda Patil	43,973	20.10%	New
SS	Sangramsinh Kupekar Alias Sangramsinh Bhagyeshrao Desai Kupekar	33,215	15.18%	▼4.87
JSS	Ashok Kashinath Charati	12,078	5.52%	▼6.42
Independent	Ramesh Dattu Redekar	10,133	4.63%	New
Independent	Aniruddh Kedari Redekar	5,133	2.35%	New
NOTA	None of the Above	1,793	0.82%	▲0.27
Margin of victory		4,385	2.00%	▼1.78
Turnout		2,20,923	68.76%	▼3.27
Total valid votes		2,18,754		
Registered electors		3,21,301		▲5.94
NCP hold		Swing	▲1.55	

=== Assembly Election 2014 ===
2014 Maharashtra Legislative Assembly election : Chandgad
Party	Candidate	Votes	%	±%
NCP	Sandhyadevi Krushnarao Desai Kupekar	51,599	23.84%	▼26.81
SS	Narsingrao Gurunath Patil	43,400	20.06%	▲7.89
Independent	Appi Alias Vinayak Virgonda Patil	28,847	13.33%	New
INC	Bharmu Anna Subarao Patil	25,964	12.00%	New
JSS	Sangramsinh Bhagyeshrao Desai Alias Sangramsinh Kupekar	25,844	11.94%	New
SWP	Gadyanawar Rajendra Shamrao	19,897	9.19%	New
Independent	Vithhalrao Alias Sambhajirao Babasaheb Desai	3,032	1.40%	New
NOTA	None of the Above	1,191	0.55%	New
Margin of victory		8,199	3.79%	▼9.67
Turnout		2,17,693	71.78%	▲7.58
Total valid votes		2,16,401		
Registered electors		3,03,275		▲4.79
NCP hold		Swing	▼26.81	

=== Assembly By-election 2013 ===
2013 Maharashtra Legislative Assembly by-election : Chandgad
Party	Candidate	Votes	%	±%
NCP	Desai Kupakar Sandhyadevi Krushnarao	93,486	50.65%	▲19.78
SP	Gadyanawar Rajendra Shamrao	68,639	37.19%	New
SS	S. S. Arjun	22,448	12.16%	▲9.93
Margin of victory		24,847	13.46%	▲10.90
Turnout		1,84,573	63.77%	▼14.10
Total valid votes		1,84,573		
Registered electors		2,89,418		▲8.38
NCP hold		Swing	▲19.78	

=== Assembly Election 2009 ===
2009 Maharashtra Legislative Assembly election : Chandgad
Party	Candidate	Votes	%	±%
NCP	Desai Krishnarao Rakhamajirao Alias Babasaheb Kupekar	64,194	30.87%	▲1.47
JSS	Gopalrao Motiram Patil	58,862	28.31%	▼4.18
Independent	Bharmuanna Subarao Patil	27,915	13.42%	New
Independent	Narsingrao Gurunath Patil	24,638	11.85%	New
JD(S)	Shinde Shripatrao Dinkarrao	11,887	5.72%	New
Independent	Rajendra Shamarao Gadyanavar	7,186	3.46%	New
SS	Joshi Pralhad Vishvanath	4,651	2.24%	▼30.24
Margin of victory		5,332	2.56%	▲2.56
Turnout		2,08,021	77.90%	▼4.14
Total valid votes		2,07,950		
Registered electors		2,67,039		▲49.03
NCP gain from JSS		Swing	▼1.61	

=== Assembly Election 2004 ===
2004 Maharashtra Legislative Assembly election : Chandgad
Party	Candidate	Votes	%	±%
JSS	Narsingrao Gurunath Patil	47,738	32.48%	New
SS	Bharamu Subarao Patil	47,727	32.48%	New
NCP	Gopalrao Motiram Patil	43,204	29.40%	▼18.62
BSP	Kamble B. K. Sir	1,688	1.15%	New
Independent	Sutar Namdev Basavant	1,529	1.04%	New
ABS	Darawajkar Bashir Gulmahammad	1,379	0.94%	New
LJP	Natalekar Ramchandra Ananda	1,079	0.73%	New
Margin of victory		11	0.01%	▼5.66
Turnout		1,46,975	82.02%	▲2.87
Total valid votes		1,46,961		
Registered electors		1,79,187		▲13.86
JSS gain from NCP		Swing	▼15.53	

=== Assembly Election 1999 ===
1999 Maharashtra Legislative Assembly election : Chandgad
Party	Candidate	Votes	%	±%
NCP	Narsingrao Gurunath Patil	59,805	48.01%	New
Independent	Bharmu Subrao Patil	52,749	42.35%	New
INC	Chavan Patil Sureshrao Vitthalrao	4,729	3.80%	▼37.91
Independent	Darawajkar Bashir Gulmahammad	4,490	3.60%	New
Independent	Desai Sampat Gajanan	2,612	2.10%	New
Margin of victory		7,056	5.66%	▲1.69
Turnout		1,29,008	81.97%	▼2.60
Total valid votes		1,24,555		
Registered electors		1,57,375		▲0.73
NCP gain from Independent		Swing	▲2.33	

=== Assembly Election 1995 ===
1995 Maharashtra Legislative Assembly election : Chandgad
Party	Candidate	Votes	%	±%
Independent	Bharamu Subarao Patil	58,347	45.68%	New
INC	Narsingrao Gurunath Patil	53,264	41.70%	▼13.47
SS	Redekar Kedari Balkrishna	13,681	10.71%	▲2.67
Independent	Bandiwadekar Maruti Satappa	1,021	0.80%	New
Independent	Desai Maruti Dhondiba	827	0.65%	New
Margin of victory		5,083	3.98%	▼18.01
Turnout		1,30,819	83.73%	▲7.98
Total valid votes		1,27,720		
Registered electors		1,56,242		▲9.96
Independent gain from INC		Swing	▼9.49	

=== Assembly Election 1990 ===
1990 Maharashtra Legislative Assembly election : Chandgad
Party	Candidate	Votes	%	±%
INC	Narsingrao Gurunath Patil	57,826	55.17%	▲20.01
Independent	Bharamu Subarao Patil	34,783	33.19%	New
SS	Waghmare Tamaji Shatupa	8,431	8.04%	New
PWPI	Sadashiv Ramrao Patil	2,035	1.94%	New
Independent	Sawant - Bhosale Shivajirao Hanmantrao	1,057	1.01%	New
Margin of victory		23,043	21.99%	▲18.98
Turnout		1,06,908	75.24%	▼5.90
Total valid votes		1,04,807		
Registered electors		1,42,084		▲19.77
INC hold		Swing	▲20.01	

=== Assembly Election 1985 ===
1985 Maharashtra Legislative Assembly election : Chandgad
Party	Candidate	Votes	%	±%
INC	Chavan Patil V. K.	33,232	35.16%	New
Independent	Narsingrao Gurunath Patil	30,387	32.15%	New
IC(S)	Desai Baliram Dattatraya	30,097	31.85%	New
Margin of victory		2,845	3.01%	▼5.35
Turnout		96,609	81.44%	▲7.71
Total valid votes		94,506		
Registered electors		1,18,630		▲9.99
INC gain from INC(I)		Swing	▼14.70	

=== Assembly Election 1980 ===
1980 Maharashtra Legislative Assembly election : Chandgad
Party	Candidate	Votes	%	±%
INC(I)	V. K. Chavan Patil	38,695	49.86%	New
INC(U)	Narsingrao Gurunath Patil	32,205	41.50%	New
PWPI	S. R. Patil	5,960	7.68%	▼12.21
Independent	Baliram Desai Dattajirao	745	0.96%	New
Margin of victory		6,490	8.36%	▲7.29
Turnout		79,523	73.73%	▼3.51
Total valid votes		77,605		
Registered electors		1,07,851		▲7.88
INC(I) gain from Independent		Swing	▲13.33	

=== Assembly Election 1978 ===
1978 Maharashtra Legislative Assembly election : Chandgad
Party	Candidate	Votes	%	±%
Independent	Vithalrao Bhairu Patil	27,556	36.53%	New
INC	Narsingrao Gurunath Patil	26,749	35.46%	▼3.85
PWPI	Narsingrao Bhujang Patil	15,007	19.89%	▼9.3
JP	Dundagekar (Patil) Namadeo Ramchandra	6,129	8.12%	New
Margin of victory		807	1.07%	▼8.09
Turnout		78,178	78.20%	▲1.27
Total valid votes		75,441		
Registered electors		99,970		▲17.88
Independent gain from INC		Swing	▼2.78	

=== Assembly Election 1972 ===
1972 Maharashtra Legislative Assembly election : Chandgad
Party	Candidate	Votes	%	±%
INC	Desai Vasantrao Abasaheb	24,730	39.30%	▼11.55
Independent	Chavan Patil V. K.	18,966	30.14%	New
PWPI	Narsingrao Bhujang Patil	18,368	29.19%	▼16.66
INC(O)	Khavare Ganapati Dhondiba	858	1.36%	New
Margin of victory		5,764	9.16%	▲4.17
Turnout		65,510	77.25%	▲5.85
Total valid votes		62,922		
Registered electors		84,803		▲15.26
INC hold		Swing	▼11.55	

=== Assembly Election 1967 ===
1967 Maharashtra Legislative Assembly election : Chandgad
Party	Candidate	Votes	%	±%
INC	V. K. Chavan Patil	25,568	50.85%	▼8.83
PWPI	Narsingrao Bhujang Patil	23,058	45.86%	▲14.82
Independent	G. R. Bandekar	1,657	3.30%	New
Margin of victory		2,510	4.99%	▼23.64
Turnout		52,897	71.90%	▲8.05
Total valid votes		50,283		
Registered electors		73,573		▲10.63
INC hold		Swing	▼8.83	

=== Assembly Election 1962 ===
1962 Maharashtra Legislative Assembly election : Chandgad
Party	Candidate	Votes	%	±%
INC	V. K. Chavan Patil	23,930	59.68%	▲37.75
PWPI	Ravalnath Bhagoji Madholkar	12,447	31.04%	▼20.88
Independent	Govind Raghoba Bandekar	2,667	6.65%	New
Independent	Yeshwant Tukaram Kambale	1,056	2.63%	New
Margin of victory		11,483	28.64%	▲2.87
Turnout		42,512	63.92%	▲0.77
Total valid votes		40,100		
Registered electors		66,505		▲13.11
INC gain from PWPI		Swing	▲7.76	

=== Assembly Election 1957 ===
1957 Bombay State Legislative Assembly election : Chandgad
Party	Candidate	Votes	%	±%
PWPI	Narsingrao Bhujang Patil	18,170	51.92%	▼10.59
Independent	Thakur Dhondo Rajaram	9,154	26.16%	New
INC	Chavan Patil Vithal Kallappa	7,674	21.93%	▼15.57
Margin of victory		9,016	25.76%	▲0.75
Turnout		34,998	59.53%	▼9.10
Total valid votes		34,998		
Registered electors		58,795		▲13.98
PWPI hold		Swing	▼10.59	

=== Assembly Election 1952 ===
1952 Bombay State Legislative Assembly election : Chandgad
Party	Candidate	Votes	%	±%
PWPI	Vithal Sitaram Patil	22,125	62.51%	New
INC	Desai Venkat Paravatrao	13,272	37.49%	New
Turnout		35,397	68.62%	
Total valid votes		35,397		
Registered electors		51,582		
INC win (new seat)				

== See also ==
- Chandgad
- List of constituencies of Maharashtra Vidhan Sabha
