= Kolhapur Assembly constituency =

Former constituency of the Maharashtra legislative assembly in India

Coordinates: 19.020°N 72.843°E

Kolhapur
- Former constituency for the Maharashtra Legislative Assembly

Constituency details
- Country: India
- Region: Western India
- State: Maharashtra
- Lok Sabha constituency: Kolhapur
- Established: 1952
- Abolished: 2008

Kolhapur Vidhan Sabha seat was one of the constituencies of Maharashtra Vidhan Sabha, in India. It was a segment of Kolhapur Lok Sabha constituency. Kolhapur seat existed until the 2004 elections after which it was bifurcated into Kolhapur North & Kolhapur South seat in 2008.

== Members of Legislative Assembly ==
Year	Member	Party
1952	Balvant Dhondo Baralay	Peasants and Workers Party
1957	Pandurang Salokhe	Peasants and Workers Party
1962	Tryambak Sitaram Karkhanis	Peasants and Workers Party
1967	Tryambak Sitaram Karkhanis	Peasants and Workers Party
1972	Tryambak Sitaram Karkhanis	Peasants and Workers Party
1978	Ravindra Sabnis	Janata Party
1980	Lalasaheb Balasaheb Yadav	Indian National Congress (I)
1985	N. D. Patil	Peasants and Workers Party
1990	Diliprao Malharrao Desai	Shiv Sena
1995	Suresh Balvant Salokhe	Shiv Sena
1999	Suresh Balvant Salokhe	Shiv Sena
2004	Malojiraje Chhatrapati	Indian National Congress
2009 onwards : See Kolhapur North & Kolhapur South

== Election results ==
=== Assembly Election 2004 ===
2004 Maharashtra Legislative Assembly election : Kolhapur
Party	Candidate	Votes	%	±%
INC	Chhatrapati Malojiraje Shahu	76,157	53.62%	▲27.90
SS	Suresh Balwant Salokhe	48,015	33.80%	▲1.45
CPI	Vijay Shamrao Devane	11,718	8.25%	New
JSS	Adv. Shamrao Govindrao Shinde	3,898	2.74%	New
PWPI	Ravindra Sambhaji Chavan	1,180	0.83%	▼22.06
BSP	Wagh Sanjay Shankarrao	1,071	0.75%	New
Margin of victory		28,142	19.81%	▲13.18
Turnout		142,061	65.24%	▲9.48
Total valid votes		142,039		
Registered electors		217,736		▲11.24
INC gain from SS		Swing	▲21.27	

=== Assembly Election 1999 ===
1999 Maharashtra Legislative Assembly election : Kolhapur
Party	Candidate	Votes	%	±%
SS	Suresh Balwant Salokhe	35,305	32.35%	▼7.59
INC	Adv. Adagule Mahadeo Dadoba	28,068	25.72%	▲10.44
PWPI	Prof. Ingavale Vishnupant Anandrao	24,984	22.89%	▼5.96
NCP	R. K. Powar	20,773	19.04%	New
Margin of victory		7,237	6.63%	▼4.46
Turnout		112,892	57.68%	▼13.80
Total valid votes		109,130		
Registered electors		195,737		▲5.58
SS hold		Swing	▼7.59	

=== Assembly Election 1995 ===
1995 Maharashtra Legislative Assembly election : Kolhapur
Party	Candidate	Votes	%	±%
SS	Suresh Balwant Salokhe	51,510	39.95%	▲3.91
PWPI	Prof. Ingavale Vishnupant Anandrao	37,209	28.86%	▲7.02
INC	Desai Shivani Diliprao	19,708	15.28%	▼13.11
CPI	Pansare Govind Pandharinath	10,834	8.40%	New
Independent	Desai Shivajirao Dattajirao	2,497	1.94%	New
Independent	Patil Vilasrao Shripatrao	2,239	1.74%	New
Independent	Kate Bhagawanrao Vilasrao	1,593	1.24%	New
Margin of victory		14,301	11.09%	▲3.45
Turnout		130,722	70.51%	▲7.64
Total valid votes		128,949		
Registered electors		185,390		▲15.24
SS hold		Swing	▲3.91	

=== Assembly Election 1990 ===
1990 Maharashtra Legislative Assembly election : Kolhapur
Party	Candidate	Votes	%	±%
SS	Desai Diliprao Malharrao	35,889	36.03%	New
INC	Kharade Sakharambapu	28,282	28.40%	▼5.08
PWPI	N. D. Patil	21,747	21.83%	▼31.06
Independent	Ghosalkar Suresh Tukaram	9,772	9.81%	New
Independent	Khallil Maner	3,010	3.02%	New
Margin of victory		7,607	7.64%	▼11.79
Turnout		100,533	62.49%	▲15.22
Total valid votes		99,601		
Registered electors		160,866		▲13.59
SS gain from PWPI		Swing	▼16.87	

=== Assembly Election 1985 ===
1985 Maharashtra Legislative Assembly election : Kolhapur
Party	Candidate	Votes	%	±%
PWPI	N. D. Patil	34,986	52.90%	▲27.84
INC	Yadav Lalsaheb Belasaheb	22,140	33.48%	New
Independent	Kulkarni Vijay Ganesh	2,094	3.17%	New
Independent	Salokhe Chandrakant Balwantrao	1,663	2.51%	New
Independent	Waskar Ganesh Mahadeo	1,527	2.31%	New
Independent	Karkhanis Tryambak Sitaram	1,301	1.97%	New
Independent	Patil Santaram Sakharam	911	1.38%	New
Margin of victory		12,846	19.42%	▲7.56
Turnout		66,467	46.93%	▼4.98
Total valid votes		66,138		
Registered electors		141,623		▲24.43
PWPI gain from INC(I)		Swing	▲15.98	

=== Assembly Election 1980 ===
1980 Maharashtra Legislative Assembly election : Kolhapur
Party	Candidate	Votes	%	±%
INC(I)	Yadav Lalsaheb Belasaheb	21,718	36.92%	▲20.55
PWPI	Salokhe Hindurao Krishnarao	14,740	25.06%	▲0.92
BJP	Vora Subhash Bahubhai	11,592	19.71%	New
JP	Ravindra Sabnis	8,387	14.26%	▼16.23
Independent	Shankar Rao Ganpatrao Chougule	1,233	2.10%	New
Independent	Pawar Pandurang Baburao	515	0.88%	New
Margin of victory		6,978	11.86%	▲5.51
Turnout		59,352	52.15%	▼21.64
Total valid votes		58,825		
Registered electors		113,815		▲6.55
INC(I) gain from JP		Swing	▲6.43	

=== Assembly Election 1978 ===
1978 Maharashtra Legislative Assembly election : Kolhapur
Party	Candidate	Votes	%	±%
JP	Sabnis Ravindra Ramchandra	23,877	30.49%	New
PWPI	Salokhe Hindurao Krishnarao	18,904	24.14%	▼30.19
INC(I)	Yadav Lalsaheb Belasaheb	12,824	16.37%	New
INC	Chavan Dayandeo Subrao	11,468	14.64%	▼27.23
CPI	Pansare Govind Pandharinath	8,236	10.52%	New
Independent	Dehmukha(Khot) Madanrao Yeshwant	855	1.09%	New
Independent	Sawant Shankarrao Gundoba	676	0.86%	New
Margin of victory		4,973	6.35%	▼6.10
Turnout		79,268	74.21%	▲1.26
Total valid votes		78,321		
Registered electors		106,821		▲7.39
JP gain from PWPI		Swing	▼23.84	

=== Assembly Election 1972 ===
1972 Maharashtra Legislative Assembly election : Kolhapur
Party	Candidate	Votes	%	±%
PWPI	Karkhanis T. Rao Sitaram	38,943	54.33%	▼13.17
INC	Popatrao B. Jaganale	30,018	41.88%	▲19.59
ABJS	Mane Gopalrao Sahebrao	2,034	2.84%	▼6.57
Independent	Tipugade Vishnu Vithu	475	0.66%	New
Margin of victory		8,925	12.45%	▼32.77
Turnout		72,736	73.12%	▲5.16
Total valid votes		71,682		
Registered electors		99,470		▲41.52
PWPI hold		Swing	▼13.17	

=== Assembly Election 1967 ===
1967 Maharashtra Legislative Assembly election : Kolhapur
Party	Candidate	Votes	%	±%
PWPI	Karkhanis T. Rao Sitaram	31,743	67.50%	▲17.19
INC	D. R. Bagade	10,479	22.28%	▼17.89
ABJS	V. N. Sanglikar	4,423	9.41%	▲2.03
Margin of victory		21,264	45.22%	▲35.08
Turnout		49,235	70.05%	▼2.98
Total valid votes		47,027		
Registered electors		70,286		▲3.04
PWPI hold		Swing	▲17.19	

=== Assembly Election 1962 ===
1962 Maharashtra Legislative Assembly election : Kolhapur
Party	Candidate	Votes	%	±%
PWPI	Karkhanis T. Rao Sitaram	23,984	50.31%	▼20.00
INC	Pandurang Bapurao Salunkhe	19,151	40.17%	▲21.53
ABJS	Balavant Krishnaji Methe	3,516	7.38%	New
Independent	Annappa Baburao Padalkar	708	1.49%	New
Independent	Mohammed Sharif Aba Nadaf	313	0.66%	New
Margin of victory		4,833	10.14%	▼41.53
Turnout		49,243	72.19%	▲4.55
Total valid votes		47,672		
Registered electors		68,213		▲9.40
PWPI hold		Swing	▼20.00	

=== Assembly Election 1957 ===
1957 Bombay State Legislative Assembly election : Kolhapur
Party	Candidate	Votes	%	±%
PWPI	Salokhe Pandurang Bapurao	28,644	70.31%	New
INC	Dabholkar Ahilyabai Sankarrao	7,595	18.64%	New
Independent	Takalikar (Patil) Dattoba Dada	4,502	11.05%	New
Margin of victory		21,049	51.67%	New
Turnout		40,741	65.34%	New
Total valid votes		40,741		
Registered electors		62,353		New
PWPI hold		Swing	{{{swing}}}	

== See also ==
- List of constituencies of Maharashtra Legislative Assembly
