= Kolhapur Lok Sabha constituency =

Constituency of the Indian parliament in Maharashtra

Coordinates: 16.7°N 74.2°E

Kolhapur
- Lok Sabha constituency
- Kolhapur Lok Sabha Constituency map

Constituency details
- Country: India
- Region: Western India
- State: Maharashtra
- Assembly constituencies: Chandgad; Radhanagari; Kagal; Kolhapur South; Karvir; Kolhapur North
- Established: 1952
- Reservation: None

Member of Parliament
- 18th Lok Sabha
- Incumbent Shahu II of Kolhapur
- Party: Indian National Congress
- Elected year: 2024

Kolhapur Lok Sabha seat is one of the 48 Lok Sabha (parliamentary) constituencies in Maharashtra state India.

== Assembly segments ==
Presently, after the implementation of the Presidential notification on delimitation on 19 February 2008, Kolhapur Lok Sabha constituency comprises six Vidhan Sabha (legislative assembly) segments. These segments are:

#	Name	District	Member	Party	Leading (in 2024)
271	Chandgad	Kolhapur	Shivaji Satuppa Patil	IND	INC
272	Radhanagari	Kolhapur	Prakashrao Abitkar	SHS	INC
273	Kagal	Kolhapur	Hasan Mushrif	NCP	SHS
274	Kolhapur South	Kolhapur	Amal Mahadik	BJP	INC
275	Karvir	Kolhapur	Chandradip Narke	SHS	INC
276	Kolhapur North	Kolhapur	Rajesh Kshirsagar	SHS	INC

== Members of Parliament ==
Year	Name	Party
1952	Ratnappa Kumbhar	Indian National Congress
1957	Bhausaheb Mahagaonkar	Peasants and Workers Party of India
1962	V. T. Patil	Indian National Congress
1967	Shankarrao Mane	Indian National Congress
1971	Rajaram Nimbalkar	Indian National Congress
1977	Dajiba Desai	Peasants and Workers Party of India
1980	Udaysingrao Gaikwad	Indian National Congress
1984	Udaysingrao Gaikwad	Indian National Congress
1989	Udaysingrao Gaikwad	Indian National Congress
1991	Udaysingrao Gaikwad	Indian National Congress
1996	Udaysingrao Gaikwad	Indian National Congress
1998	Sadashivrao Dadoba Mandlik	Indian National Congress
1999	Sadashivrao Dadoba Mandlik	Nationalist Congress Party
2004	Sadashivrao Dadoba Mandlik	Nationalist Congress Party
2009	Sadashivrao Dadoba Mandlik	Independent
2014	Dhananjay Mahadik	Nationalist Congress Party
2019	Sanjay Sadashivrao Mandlik	Shiv Sena
2024	Shahu Chhatrapati Maharaj	Indian National Congress

== Election results ==
=== 2024 ===
2024 Indian general elections: Kolhapur
Party	Candidate	Votes	%	±%
INC	Shahu Chhatrapati Maharaj	754,522	54.15	▲54.15
SHS	Sanjay Sadashivrao Mandlik	5,99,558	43.03	▼13.26
NOTA	None of the Above	5,983	0.43	▲0.22
Majority		1,54,964	11.12	▼9.21
Turnout		13,94,170	71.76	▲0.90
INC gain from SS		Swing		

=== 2019 ===
2019 Indian general elections: Kolhapur
Party	Candidate	Votes	%	±%
SS	Sanjay Sadashiv Mandlik	749,085	56.29	+10.74
NCP	Dhananjay Mahadik	4,78,517	35.96	−12.23
VBA	Dr.Aruna Mohan Mali	63,439	4.77	−28.34
NOTA	None of the Above	8,691	0.65	+0.09
BSP	Dundappa Kundappa	5,034	0.38	−0.36
Majority		2,70,568	20.33	+17.69
Turnout		13,32,504	70.86	−0.86
SS gain from NCP		Swing		

=== 2014 ===
2014 Indian general elections: Kolhapur
Party	Candidate	Votes	%	±%
NCP	Dhananjay Bhimrao Mahadik	607,665	48.19	+10.90
SS	Sanjay Mandlik	5,74,406	45.55	+33.11
PWPI	Sampatrao Shamrao Pawar Patil	13,162	1.04	
IND	Sandeep Gundopant Sankpal	10,963	0.87	
BSP	Ajay Prakash Kurane	9,291	0.74	
NOTA	None of the Above	7,015	0.56	
Majority		33,259	2.64	
Turnout		12,61,018	71.72	
NCP gain from Independent		Swing		

=== 2009 ===
2009 Indian general elections: Kolhapur
Party	Candidate	Votes	%	±%
IND.	Sadashivrao Mandlik	4,28,082	41.65	
NCP	Sambhajiraje Chhatrapati	3,83,282	37.29	
SS	Vijay Devane	1,72,822	12.44	
BSP	Kamble Suhas Nivrutti	21,805	2.12	
Majority		44,800	4.36	
Turnout		10,27,802	64.93	
Independent gain from NCP		Swing		

=== 2004 ===
2004 Indian general election: Kolhapur
Party	Candidate	Votes	%	±%
NCP	Sadashivrao Mandlik	401,922	49.42	
SS	Dhananjay Mahadik	387,169	47.60	
PWPI	Patrakar Sunanda More	13,266	1.63	
BSP	Krishnaji Wagh	10,987	1.35	
Majority		14,753	1.82	
Turnout				
NCP hold		Swing		

=== 1999 ===
1999 Indian general election: Kolhapur
Party	Candidate	Votes	%	±%
NCP	Sadashivrao Mandlik	346,459	46.33	
INC	Udaysingrao Gaikwad	237,549	31.76	
SS	Shivajirao Shripati Patil	163,866	21.91	
Majority		108,910	14.57	
Turnout		775,000	72.32	
NCP gain from INC		Swing		

=== 1998 ===
1998 Indian general election: Kolhapur
Party	Candidate	Votes	%	±%
INC	Sadashivrao Mandlik	367,951	51.66	
SS	Vikramsinh Ghatge	306,353	43.01	
JD	Shripatrao Shinde	37,985	5.33	
Majority		61,598	8.65	
Turnout		720,381	69.19	
INC hold		Swing		

=== 1996 ===
1996 Indian general election: Kolhapur
Party	Candidate	Votes	%	±%
INC	Udaysingrao Gaikwad	236,739	43.93	
SS	Ramesh Deo	168,414	31.25	
PWPI	N. D. Patil	117,163	21.74	
IND	10 Independent Candidates	16,591	3.08	
Majority		68,325	12.68	
Turnout		548,946	52.87	
INC hold		Swing		

=== 1991 ===
1991 Indian general election: Kolhapur
Party	Candidate	Votes	%	±%
INC	Udaysingrao Gaikwad	269,508	64.31	
SS	Phalake Shripatrao	75,177	17.94	
PWPI	Vishnupant Anandrao	58,273	13.91	
OTH	13 Other Candidates	16,117	3.85	
Majority		194,331	46.37	
Turnout		424,742	46.93	
INC gain from SS		Swing		

=== 1989 ===
1989 Indian general election: Kolhapur
Party	Candidate	Votes	%	±%
INC	Udaysingrao Gaikwad	274,676	53.00	
PWPI	Govindrao Tukaram	233,548	45.06	
OTH	6 Other Candidates	10,036	1.94	
Majority		41,128	7.94	
Turnout		529,153	59.22	
INC hold		Swing		

=== 1984 ===
1984 Indian general election: Kolhapur
Party	Candidate	Votes	%	±%
INC	Udaysingrao Gaikwad	277,603	65.33	
PWPI	B. D. Killedar	128,129	30.15	
IND	Vijaykumar Khade	10,526	2.48	
IND	4 Independent Candidates	8,665	2.03	
Majority		149,474	35.18	
Turnout		433,988	58.81	
INC gain from INC(I)		Swing		

=== 1980 ===
1980 Indian general election: Kolhapur
Party	Candidate	Votes	%	±%
INC(I)	Udaysingrao Gaikwad	245,757	62.48	
PWPI	Dajiba Desai	91,314	23.22	
IND	Rajaram Nimbalkar	46,526	11.83	
RPI	Bhosle Vasant Ravaji	1,945	0.49	
IND	5 Independent Candidates	7,780	1.98	
Majority		154,443	39.26	
Turnout		403,326	61.60	
INC(I) gain from PWPI		Swing		

=== 1977 ===
1977 Indian general election: Kolhapur
Party	Candidate	Votes	%	±%
PWPI	Dajiba Desai	186,077	49.74	
INC	Dattatray Shankarrao Mane	185,912	49.70	
IND	Mali Shamrao Govind	2,109	0.56	
Majority		165	0.04	
Turnout		384,229	69.66	
PWPI gain from INC		Swing		

Dajiba Desai defeated Shankarrao Mane by just 165 votes, the lowest winning margin in 1977 Lok Sabha elections for any seat. The highest margin for 1977 was recorded by Ram Vilas Paswan in Hajipur.

=== 1971 ===
1971 Indian general election: Kolhapur
Party	Candidate	Votes	%	±%
INC	Rajaram Nimbalkar	203,631	65.30	
PWPI	Dajiba Desai	95,967	30.77	
SSP	Bapusaheb Adagonda Patil	8,766	2.81	
IND	Laxmanrao Krishnaji More	2,573	0.83	
IND	Kashiram Ratnasavant Desai	919	0.29	
Majority		107,664	34.53	
Turnout		321,216	64.97	
INC hold		Swing		

=== 1967 ===
1967 Indian general election: Kolhapur
Party	Candidate	Votes	%	±%
INC	S. D. Mane	158,327	51.15	
PWPI	D. S. Narvekar	125,617	40.58	
IND	R. R. Yadav	21,851	7.06	
IND	V. G. Shirgaonkar	3,736	1.21	
Majority		32,710	10.57	
Turnout		323,990	70.91	
INC hold		Swing		

=== 1962 ===
1962 Indian general election: Kolhapur
Party	Candidate	Votes	%	±%
INC	Vishwanath Patil	144,856	61.93	
PWPI	Bhausaheb Mahagaonkar	81,187	34.71	
IND	Lalsaheb Madhavrao Chavan	7,874	3.37	
Majority		63,669	27.22	
Turnout		244,437	62.40	
INC win (new seat)				

=== 1957 ===
1957 Indian general election: Kolhapur (2 seats)
Party	Candidate	Votes	%	±%
SCF	Shankarrao Khanderao Dige	269,605	31.02	
PWPI	Bhausaheb Mahagaonkar	230,945	26.57	
INC	Laxman More Krishnaji	126,544	14.56	
IND	Khardekar Balasaheb Hanamant	103,733	11.93	
INC	Shreshti Mahadeo Dundappa	97,966	11.27	
IND	Jadhav Shamrao Omanna	40,451	4.65	
Majority		38,660	4.45	
Turnout		869,244	60.21	

=== 1952 ===
1952 Indian general election: Kolhapur cum Satara (2 seats)
Party	Candidate	Votes	%	±%
IND	Balasaheb Khardekar	223,056	26.80	
INC	Ratnappa Kumbhar	163,505	19.65	
INC	Laxman Krishnaji More	145,747	17.51	
SCF	R. R. Bhole	124,933	15.01	
PWPI	Mane Shantaram Nanasaheb	113,767	13.67	
Socialist	Bagal Vasantrao Khanderao	61,157	7.35	
Majority		59,551	7.15	
Turnout		832,165	55.51	

== See also ==
- Kolhapur district
- List of constituencies of the Lok Sabha
