= Kagal Assembly constituency =

Constituency of the Maharashtra legislative assembly in India

Coordinates: 16.59°N 74.31°E

Kagal
- Constituency No. 273 for the Maharashtra Legislative Assembly

Constituency details
- Country: India
- Region: Western India
- State: Maharashtra
- District: Kolhapur
- Lok Sabha constituency: Kolhapur
- Established: 1962
- Total electors: 345,397
- Reservation: None

Member of Legislative Assembly
- 15th Maharashtra Legislative Assembly
- Incumbent Hasan Mushrif
- Party: NCP
- Alliance: NDA
- Elected year: 2024

Kagal Assembly constituency is one of the 288 Vidhan Sabha (legislative assembly) constituencies of Maharashtra state in western India.

== Overview ==
Kagal (constituency number 273) is one of the ten Vidhan Sabha constituencies located in the Kolhapur district. This constituency covers the entire Kagal tehsil and parts of the Ajra and Gaghinglaj tehsils of this district.

Kagal is part of the Kolhapur Lok Sabha constituency along with five other Vidhan Sabha segments in this district, namely Chandgad, Radhanagari, Kolhapur South, Karvir and Kolhapur North.

== Members of the Legislative Assembly ==
Election	Member	Party
1952	Malharrao Rajaramrao Desai	Independent politician
1957	Vimalabai Vasant Bagal	Independent politician
1962	Shamrao Bhivaji Patil	Indian National Congress
1967	Daulatrao. A. Nikam	Indian National Congress
1972	Sadashivrao Dadoba Mandlik	Independent politician
1978	Vikramsinh Jayasingrao Ghatage	Independent politician
1980	Vikramsinh Jayasingrao Ghatage	Indian National Congress (I)
1985	Sadashivrao Dadoba Mandlik	Indian Congress (Socialist)
1990	Sadashivrao Dadoba Mandlik	Indian National Congress
1995	Sadashivrao Dadoba Mandlik	Indian National Congress
1998 By-election	Sanjay Anandrao Ghatage	Shiv Sena
1999	Hasan Miyalal Mushrif	Nationalist Congress Party
2004	Hasan Miyalal Mushrif	Nationalist Congress Party
2009	Hasan Miyalal Mushrif	Nationalist Congress Party
2014	Hasan Miyalal Mushrif	Nationalist Congress Party
2019	Hasan Miyalal Mushrif	Nationalist Congress Party
2024	Hasan Miyalal Mushrif	Nationalist Congress Party

== Election results ==
=== Assembly Election 2024 ===
2024 Maharashtra Legislative Assembly election : Kagal
Party	Candidate	Votes	%	±%
NCP	Hasan Miyalal Mushrif	145,269	50.81%	New
NCP-SP	Ghatge Samarjeetsinh Vikramsinh	133,688	46.76%	New
Independent	Sataprao Shivajirao Sonalkar	2,319	0.81%	New
MNS	Rohan Anil Nirmal	1,918	0.67%	New
NOTA	None of the above	886	0.31%	▼0.13
Margin of victory		11,581	4.05%	▼6.67
Turnout		286,816	83.04%	▲1.62
Total valid votes		285,930		
Registered electors		345,397		▲6.39
Nationalist Congress Party (post–2023) gain from NCP		Swing	▲6.45	

=== Assembly Election 2019 ===
2019 Maharashtra Legislative Assembly election : Kagal
Party	Candidate	Votes	%	±%
NCP	Hasan Miyalal Mushrif	116,436	44.36%	▼4.97
Independent	Ghatge Samarjeetsinh Vikramsinh	88,303	33.64%	New
SS	Sanjay Anandrao Ghatage	55,657	21.20%	▼25.76
NOTA	None of the above	1,163	0.44%	▲0.10
Margin of victory		28,133	10.72%	▲8.35
Turnout		264,332	81.42%	▼0.92
Total valid votes		262,473		
Registered electors		324,647		▲6.24
NCP hold		Swing	▼4.97	

=== Assembly Election 2014 ===
2014 Maharashtra Legislative Assembly election : Kagal
Party	Candidate	Votes	%	±%
NCP	Hasan Miyalal Mushrif	123,626	49.33%	▲3.28
SS	Ghatage Sanjay Anandrao	117,692	46.96%	New
BJP	Parasharam Satappa Taware	5,521	2.20%	New
NOTA	None of the above	850	0.34%	New
Margin of victory		5,934	2.37%	▼18.13
Turnout		251,622	82.34%	▲1.08
Total valid votes		250,602		
Registered electors		305,582		▲9.64
NCP hold		Swing	▲3.28	

=== Assembly Election 2009 ===
2009 Maharashtra Legislative Assembly election : Kagal
Party	Candidate	Votes	%	±%
NCP	Hasan Miyalal Mushrif	104,241	46.05%	▼2.99
Independent	Sanjaysinh (Dada) Sadashivrao Mandalik	57,829	25.55%	New
SWP	Ghatage Sanjay Anandrao	57,271	25.30%	New
Independent	Shinde Rajendra Govinda	2,232	0.99%	New
BSP	Nagaratna Siddharth Abaso	1,977	0.87%	▲0.09
Margin of victory		46,412	20.50%	▲19.81
Turnout		226,476	81.26%	▼7.38
Total valid votes		226,347		
Registered electors		278,710		▲52.25
NCP hold		Swing	▼2.99	

=== Assembly Election 2004 ===
2004 Maharashtra Legislative Assembly election : Kagal
Party	Candidate	Votes	%	±%
NCP	Hasan Miyalal Mushrif	79,533	49.04%	▼1.06
SS	Ghatge Sanjay Anandrao	78,408	48.34%	▲46.65
Independent	Prabhakar Ganpati Hegade	1,665	1.03%	New
BSP	Nasirkhan Alias Raju Mumtaj Naikwadi	1,270	0.78%	New
Margin of victory		1,125	0.69%	▼1.44
Turnout		162,259	88.64%	▲4.99
Total valid votes		162,194		
Registered electors		183,059		▲11.28
NCP hold		Swing	▼1.06	

=== Assembly Election 1999 ===
1999 Maharashtra Legislative Assembly election : Kagal
Party	Candidate	Votes	%	±%
NCP	Hasan Miyalal Mushrif	67,610	50.10%	New
INC	Ghatage Sanjay Anandrao	64,729	47.96%	▲0.79
SS	Patil Dilip Gundu	2,286	1.69%	▼50.74
Margin of victory		2,881	2.13%	▼3.13
Turnout		137,610	83.65%	▲0.28
Total valid votes		134,953		
Registered electors		164,509		▲5.91
NCP gain from SS		Swing	▼2.33	

=== Assembly By-election 1998 ===
1998 Maharashtra Legislative Assembly by-election : Kagal
Party	Candidate	Votes	%	±%
SS	Sanjay Anandrao Ghatage	67,472	52.43%	New
INC	Hasan Miyalal Mushrif	60,706	47.17%	▼5.84
Margin of victory		6,766	5.26%	▼2.88
Turnout		129,498	83.37%	▼3.25
Total valid votes		128,685		
Registered electors		155,323		▼1.05
SS gain from INC		Swing	▼0.58	

=== Assembly Election 1995 ===
1995 Maharashtra Legislative Assembly election : Kagal
Party	Candidate	Votes	%	±%
INC	Sadashivrao Dadoba Mandlik	71,127	53.01%	▲0.47
Independent	Ghatage Vikramsinh Jayasingrao	60,204	44.87%	New
Margin of victory		10,923	8.14%	▲2.26
Turnout		135,962	86.62%	▲4.86
Total valid votes		134,171		
Registered electors		156,969		▲14.87
INC hold		Swing	▲0.47	

=== Assembly Election 1990 ===
1990 Maharashtra Legislative Assembly election : Kagal
Party	Candidate	Votes	%	±%
INC	Sadashivrao Dadoba Mandlik	58,100	52.54%	▲2.93
JD	Ghatage Sanjay Anandrao	51,596	46.66%	New
BJP	Sarnaik Vilas Kallapa	785	0.71%	New
Margin of victory		6,504	5.88%	▲5.63
Turnout		111,724	81.76%	▼2.68
Total valid votes		110,577		
Registered electors		136,645		▲23.12
INC gain from IC(S)		Swing	▲2.68	

=== Assembly Election 1985 ===
1985 Maharashtra Legislative Assembly election : Kagal
Party	Candidate	Votes	%	±%
IC(S)	Sadashivrao Dadoba Mandlik	46,298	49.86%	New
INC	Ghatage Vikramsinh Jayasingrao	46,067	49.61%	New
Margin of victory		231	0.25%	▼7.80
Turnout		93,715	84.44%	▲2.43
Total valid votes		92,863		
Registered electors		110,988		▲9.37
IC(S) gain from INC(I)		Swing	▼4.16	

=== Assembly Election 1980 ===
1980 Maharashtra Legislative Assembly election : Kagal
Party	Candidate	Votes	%	±%
INC(I)	Ghatage Vikramsinh Jayasingrao	44,348	54.02%	New
INC(U)	Sadashivrao Dadoba Mandlik	37,741	45.98%	New
Margin of victory		6,607	8.05%	▼6.32
Turnout		83,223	82.01%	▼2.86
Total valid votes		82,089		
Registered electors		101,477		▲6.65
INC(I) gain from Independent		Swing	▲8.90	

=== Assembly Election 1978 ===
1978 Maharashtra Legislative Assembly election : Kagal
Party	Candidate	Votes	%	±%
Independent	Ghatage Vikramsinh Jayasingrao	35,913	45.12%	New
Independent	Sadashivrao Dadoba Mandlik	24,479	30.76%	New
INC	Patil Hindurao Balvantrao	18,050	22.68%	▼24.12
Independent	Kamble Laxman Ganpatrao	772	0.97%	New
Margin of victory		11,434	14.37%	▲12.07
Turnout		80,754	84.87%	▲10.28
Total valid votes		79,591		
Registered electors		95,149		▼2.00
Independent hold		Swing	▼3.98	

=== Assembly Election 1972 ===
1972 Maharashtra Legislative Assembly election : Kagal
Party	Candidate	Votes	%	±%
Independent	Sadashivrao Dadoba Mandlik	34,608	49.10%	New
INC	Nikam Daulatrao Appaji	32,984	46.80%	▼8.68
PWPI	Bagal Vimalabai Vasantrao	1,186	1.68%	New
RPI(K)	Kamble Kondiram Joti	1,063	1.51%	New
Independent	Ghougale Dinkar Krishana	638	0.91%	New
Margin of victory		1,624	2.30%	▼8.67
Turnout		72,414	74.59%	▲1.30
Total valid votes		70,479		
Registered electors		97,087		▲13.38
Independent gain from INC		Swing	▼6.38	

=== Assembly Election 1967 ===
1967 Maharashtra Legislative Assembly election : Kagal
Party	Candidate	Votes	%	±%
INC	Daulatrao. A. Nikam	32,789	55.48%	▲1.28
Independent	J. G. Sawant	26,307	44.52%	New
Margin of victory		6,482	10.97%	▼11.11
Turnout		62,755	73.29%	▲9.63
Total valid votes		59,096		
Registered electors		85,628		▲32.88
INC hold		Swing	▲1.28	

=== Assembly Election 1962 ===
1962 Maharashtra Legislative Assembly election : Kagal
Party	Candidate	Votes	%	±%
INC	Shamrao Bhivaji Patil	20,739	54.20%	▲26.60
Independent	Sadashivrao Dadoba Mandlik	12,292	32.12%	New
Independent	Vimalabai Vasant Bagal	4,220	11.03%	New
Independent	Vishnu Laxman Kamble	1,014	2.65%	New
Margin of victory		8,447	22.08%	▼22.72
Turnout		41,024	63.66%	▲5.52
Total valid votes		38,265		
Registered electors		64,440		▲11.15
INC gain from Independent		Swing	▼18.20	

=== Assembly Election 1957 ===
1957 Bombay State Legislative Assembly election : Kagal
Party	Candidate	Votes	%	±%
Independent	Bagal Vimalabai Vasant	24,401	72.40%	New
INC	Nikam Doulatrao Appaji	9,303	27.60%	▼2.76
Margin of victory		15,098	44.80%	▲26.95
Turnout		33,704	58.14%	▼3.67
Total valid votes		33,704		
Registered electors		57,974		▲5.08
Independent hold		Swing	▲24.19	

=== Assembly Election 1952 ===
1952 Bombay State Legislative Assembly election : Kagal
Party	Candidate	Votes	%	±%
Independent	Desai Malharrao Rajaramrao	16,443	48.21%	New
INC	Nikam Daulatrao Appasaheb	10,354	30.36%	New
Socialist	Sawant Shakarrao Gundoba	4,382	12.85%	New
Kamgar Kisan Paksha	Sawant Jeevanrao Ganpat	2,926	8.58%	New
Margin of victory		6,089	17.85%	
Turnout		34,105	61.81%	
Total valid votes		34,105		
Registered electors		55,173		
Independent win (new seat)				

== See also ==
- Kagal
- List of constituencies of Maharashtra Vidhan Sabha
