= Rajaram College =

Government college in Kolhapur

Rajaram College, Kolhapur is a government college affiliated to Shivaji University in Kolhapur. It offers junior college-level courses such as 11th & 12th, bachelor degree level courses such as (BSc and BA) in science, humanities, languages and arts and offers an MA in Psychology and Home science. It also runs MSc in Analytical Chemistry It also has a popular junior college offering higher secondary education courses in science and arts.

== History ==
Rajaram college was established in 1880 by the Maharaja of Kolhapur. It is the oldest college in the Kolhapur city and one of the famous college in the Maharashtra. It was affiliated to the Mumbai University and then with Pune University. Shivaji University was established in 1962 and since then it is affiliated with Shivaji University in Kolhapur. Many undergraduate and post graduate courses were available in the past which were later moved to the Shivaji university after establishment of the university. Rajaram college had played a key role in the establishment of the Shivaji University Kolhapur and first Vice chancellor of the university was Principal of Rajaram college Dr. A. G. Pawar. Rajaram college has given many great leaders in politics. It is alma mater of many famous scientists, writers, historians, educationists, army officers, and civil servants (IAS, IPS and IFS officers). It celebrated its 125th anniversary in 2005.

The college is located near Shivaji University. Many students from nearby villages study there. It is located somewhat on the outskirts of Kolhapur city. It has a large area of campus where many people from nearby areas come for pleasure walks.

The Maharashtra State supported U.P.S.C. and M.P.S.C. institute is also present in the same campus.

The college has a picturesque campus of around 75 acres. Its 13 independent buildings include a 2000 capacity auditorium. The Dr. Balkrishna Library has more than 125,000 volumes, some of which are rare and out of print books.

== Notable alumni ==
- Abhay Ashtekar, scientist, quantum gravity and cosmology
- Vishnu Vasudev Narlikar, Indian physicist
- Shivram Bhoje, nuclear scientist
- Yashwantrao Chavan CM, Maharashtra
- Balasaheb Desai, politician
- Gopal Krishna Gokhale, politician
- Vasant Gowarikar, scientist
- Khashaba Jadhav, wrestler, Olympic medalist
- Basappa Danappa Jatti, former President of India
- Narasimha Chintaman Kelkar, attorney and dramatist
- B. G. Kher, chief minister of Bombay state
- Kusumagraj (Vishnu Vaman Shirwadkar), writer and poet
- G. D. Yadav, Noted chemical engineer, researcher and educator
- R. Madhavan, Tamil and Bollywood star
- Master Vinayak (Vinayak Karnataki), film actor and producer
- S. B. Mujumdar, founder of Symbiosis Pune
- Dnyaneshwar Mulay, diplomat, author, and columnist
- Arun Nigavekar, chairman of University Grants Commission; vice chancellor, member of science & technology committee to the Prime Minister; founder director of National Assessment & Accreditation Council
- Shalinitai Patil, politician
- D. C. Pavate, educationist
- Govindrao Tembe, music composer
- Ranjit Desai, Marathi writer
- Dr. Ratnappa Kumbhar, freedom fighter and social worker
- Indira Sant, famous poet
- Vijaya Rajadhyaksha, writer
- Ramesh Mantri, writer
- Vinda Karandikar, Marathi poet awarded by Gyanpeeth Award
- Siddheshwar Swami, Indian religious leader

== Notable teachers ==
- H. P. Gandhi, diatomist; worked at the college as a biology lecturer during the 1950s
- Vinayaka Krishna Gokak (Awarded by Gyanpeeth)
- V. T. Patil, founder of Mouni Vidyapeeth
- Vasantrao Ghatge, founder of Ghatge Patil Transports Pvt. Ltd.
- Dr. Balkrishna, historian and Fellow of the Royal Society of London
- Narayan Sitaram Phadke, writer
- Madhav Patwardhan, poet also known as Madhav Julian
- Barr. Balasaheb Khardekar, educationist, member of Lok Sabha and founder of Gokhale College Kolhapur

== See also ==
- Education in India
- Literacy in India
- Degrees in India
