= Dnyandeo =

Dnyandeo is an Indian masculine given name. Notable people with the surname include:

- D. Y. Patil (Dnyandeo Yashwantrao Patil, born 1935), Governor of Bihar state in eastern India
- Satej Dnyandeo Patil (born 1972), Indian politician
