= Maharashtra State Pharmacy Council =

Maharashtra government agency

Agency overview
- Jurisdiction: (India) Maharashtra
- Headquarters: Mumbai
- Minister responsible: Amit Deshmukh, Minister of Medical Education
- Agency executives: Vijay Patil, President; Salil S Masal, Registrar
- Parent agency: Government of Maharashtra
- Website: https://www.mspcindia.org/

The Maharashtra State Pharmacy Council (MSPC) is the statutory body under Ministry of Medical Education, Government of Maharashtra. It is constituted under the Pharmacy Act, 1948. Maharashtra State Pharmacy Council regulates the profession of pharmacy in Maharashtra.

Maharashtra State Pharmacy Council provides registration facility to all pharmacists in Maharashtra.

== Members ==
Council consists of 15 members.

- 6 Pharmacists (elected by MSPC Pharmacists)
- 5 Government of Maharashtra representatives
- 1 Maharashtra Medical Council representative
- 3 Ex-Officio Members

== Objectives ==
The objectives of the MSPC are:

- Allowing the registration as a pharmacist under Section 32(2) of the Pharmacy Act.
- Regulating the profession and practice of pharmacy in Maharashtra.
- Enforcement The pharmacy Act 1948 in state of Maharashtra by appointing "Pharmacy Inspector" under section 26 (A) of said Act,

== Educational degree ==
MSPC also keeps track of educational institutes in Maharashtra and looks after accreditation with the help of Pharmacy Council of India and All India Council for Technical Education. Pharmacy colleges list is maintained by the MSPC.

The Bachelor of Pharmacy degree is popularly known as B-Pharm in India. It is a four-year program with both annual and semester schemes available. To be eligible, one must pass with at least 50% marks in 10 + 2 (or an equivalent examination) with physics, chemistry, biology or biotechnology as one of the subjects. In some states, it is mandatory to give an additional pharmacy entrance examination to be eligible for the course, the entrance tests can be the state common entrance test or, the National Eligibility cum Entrance Test (Undergraduate)(NEET). D.Pharm (Diploma of Pharmacy) holders are eligible for admission into B.Pharm second year directly via a lateral entry in India. B.Pharm holders can directly join into the 4th year of Pharm.D (PG) course.

== Drug Information Center ==
Maharashtra State Pharmacy Council established Drug Information Center (DIC) for pharmacists. It is member of IRDIS, an International Register of Drug Information Services. DIC provides unbiased information about drugs and medications.

=== Refresher courses ===
Online as well as offline refresher courses are provided by the Drug Information Center. Refresher courses are offered by the council to pharmacists who want to update their knowledge.

== See also ==
- Pharmacy Council of India
