= Rajaram Nimbalkar =

Indian politician (born 1928)

Member of Parliament, Lok Sabha
- In office 1971–1977
- Preceded by: Shankarrao Mane
- Succeeded by: Dajiba Desai
- Constituency: Kolhapur, Maharashtra

Personal details
- Born: 29 March 1928
- Party: Indian National Congress
- Spouse(s): Ushadevi aaisaheb (nee mane) Architect Ar Amarja Nimbalkar ( head of heritage committee Kolhapur, INTACH Kolhapur conveyor) is renowned for restoring the Laxmi Vilas palace of Kolhapur as well as recognising the Manikarnika kund in the Ambabai Temple. Supriya Jadhav Bajaji Nimbalkar

Rajaram Dadasaheb Nimbalkar (born 29 March 1928) is an Indian politician. He was elected to the Lok Sabha, the lower house of the Parliament of India as a member of the Indian National Congress. Son of Shri Dadasaheb Nimbalkar; born on 29 March 1928; educated at the Ludwig-Maximilians-Universität München, West Germany; married Shrimati Ushadevi Rajaram Nimbalkar; two sons and two daughters; Businessman and Agriculturist; Lectured on Salesmanship and Management all over Europe. Hobbies.—Reading and writing. Favourite pastime and recreation.—Sport. Special interests.—Political, economic, military history and philosophy; German and English literature and poetry. Publications.—Written poems, short stories, articles and plays, which have been published in magazines, newspapers—both German and English. Sports and Clubs.—Billiard (reigning champion of Kolhapur) and hockey; Member, Mahalaxmi Club Kolhapur and Münchner Sport Club, Munich, West Germany. Travels abroad.—U.S.A., U.A.R., Iraq, Europe (except the USSR).
