= Balasaheb Hanumantrao Khardekar =

Indian politician

Member of Parliament-Loksabha
- In office 1952–1957
- Preceded by: Office Created
- Succeeded by: Bhausaheb Raosaheb Mahagaonkar
- Constituency: Kolhapur.

Personal details
- Born: 1 August 1903
- Died: 26 December 1963 (aged 60)
- Party: Independent

Balasaheb Hanumantrao Khardekar (Also known as Balasaheb Hanmantrao Khardekar) (1 August 1903 – 26 December 1963) was an educationist and politician who represented Kolhapur as a Member of Parliament in the 1st Lok Sabha. He was also member of constituent assembly representing Bombay States.

== Background ==
Khardekar was born in Bombay Presidency, British India on 1 August 1903. He was educated from the University of Bombay and Cambridge University with a degree in law. He was a teacher by vocation and served as principal of Rajaram College, Kolhapur from 1940 to 1944.

== Public life ==
Khardekar was member of Constituent assembly representing Bombay States. He was opposed to prohibition as a constitutional measure. He was elected a Member of Parliament for the First Lok Sabha in 1952. He represented the Kolhapur constituency as an independent.
