= Satyajeet Patil =

Indian politician

Satyajeet (Aaba) Patil Sarudkar

Member of Maharashtra Legislative Assembly
- In office 2014–2019
- Preceded by: Vinay Kore
- Succeeded by: Vinay Kore
- Constituency: Shahuwadi
- In office 2004–2009
- Preceded by: Sanjaysinh Jaysingrao Gaikwad
- Succeeded by: Vinay Kore
- Constituency: Shahuwadi

Personal details
- Born: 4 July 1970 (age 56) kolhapur, Maharashtra
- Party: Shiv Sena (UBT)

Satyajeet (Aaba) Babasaheb Patil Sarudkar is a Shiv Sena (UBT) politician from Kolhapur district, Maharashtra. He is a former Member of Legislative Assembly from Shahuwadi Vidhan Sabha constituency of Kolhapur, Maharashtra, India as a member of Shiv Sena. He had been elected for two terms to the Maharashtra Legislative Assembly in 2004 and 2014.

== Positions held ==
- 2004: Elected to Maharashtra Legislative Assembly (1st term)
- 2014: Re-Elected to Maharashtra Legislative Assembly (2nd term)
