= V. T. Patil =

Indian politician and education reformer

MP-Loksabha; founder- Tararani Vidyapeeth, Kolhapur
- In office 1962–1967
- Constituency: Western Maharashtra – Kolhapur.

Personal details
- Born: 31 July 1900 Shigaon, Bombay Presidency, British India
- Died: 16 January 1995 (aged 94) Kolhapur, Maharashtra, India
- Party: Indian National Congress

V. T. Patil (born 31 July 1900 – 16 January 1995) was an education reformer and politician who represented Kolhapur as a Member of Parliament in the 3rd Lok Sabha that sat between 1962 and 1967. His interest in development of education in Kolhapur — a town in Maharashtra, India — is reflected in the various institutions that he either founded or was involved in founding.

== Background ==
Patil was born in Shigaon, Sangli district, Bombay Presidency, British India on 31 July 1900. He graduated from the University of Bombay with a degree in law and between 1930 and 1950 he had a legal practice in Kolhapur.

== Rural education ==
Patil had an interest in developing rural and women's education in Kolhapur. He was involved in the establishment of Tararani Vidyapeeth's Junior College of Education, and was a co-founder of Shri Mouni Vidyapeeth. In addition, he founded Kamala College and helped to establish Shivraj College of Arts & Commerce.

== Member of Parliament ==
Patil was elected a Member of Parliament for the third Lok Sabha in 1962. He represented the Kolhapur constituency as a member of the Indian National Congress.
