= Rajesh Narasingrao Patil =

Indian politician

Rajesh Narsingrao Patil

Member of Maharashtra Legislative Assembly
- In office 2019 – 26 November 2024
- Preceded by: Sandhyadevi Kupekar
- Succeeded by: Shivaji Patil
- Constituency: Chandgad

Personal details
- Party: Nationalist Congress Party
- Occupation: Politician

Rajesh Narsingrao Patil is a leader of Nationalist Congress Party and a member of the Maharashtra Legislative Assembly elected from Chandgad Assembly constituency in Kolhapur city.

== Positions held ==
- 2019: Elected to Maharashtra Legislative Assembly.
