= Indira Sant =

Indian poet

Indira Sant (4 January 1914 – 13 July 2000) was a Marathi poet from Maharashtra, India.

She was a writer, poet, and storyteller known for the detail in her poetry. She used themes of nature to portray love, separation, and loneliness.

== Life ==
Indira studied at Rajaram College in Kolhapur.

== Works ==
Poems

- Shele (शेले) (1951)
- Mendi (मेंदी) (1955)
- Mrugajal (मृगजळ) (1957)
- Ranga Bawari (रंगबावरी) (1964)
- Bahulya (बाहुल्या) (1972)
- Garbhareshim (गर्भरेशीम) (1982)
- Malan Gatha (मालन गाथा)
- Wamsh Kusum (वंशकुसुम)
- Marawa (मारवा)
- Nirakar (निराकार)
- Ghungurwala (घुंघुरवाळा)
- Chitkada (चित्कळा)
