= Udaysingrao Gaikwad =

Indian politician

Udaysingrao Nanasaheb Gaikwad

Member of Parliament, Lok Sabha
- In office 1980–1998
- Preceded by: Dajiba Desai
- Succeeded by: Sadashivrao Mandlik
- Constituency: Kolhapur, Maharashtra

Member of the Maharashtra Legislative Assembly
- In office 1972–1980
- Succeeded by: Yashwantrao Babasaheb Patil
- Constituency: Shahuwadi Assembly constituency

Personal details
- Born: 28 August 1930 Kolhapur, Bombay Presidency, British India
- Died: 2 December 2014 (aged 84) Kolhapur
- Party: Indian National Congress
- Spouse: Shrimantani Devi
- Children: Four daughters & one son

Udaysingrao Nanasaheb Gaikwad was an Indian politician. He was elected to the Maharashtra state assembly and served as a minister in the state government. Gaikwad was later elected to the Lok Sabha, the lower house of the Parliament of India from Kolhapur, Maharashtra as a member of the Indian National Congress.
