= Panhala Assembly constituency =

Constituency of the Maharashtra legislative assembly in India

Panhala
- Former constituency for the Maharashtra Legislative Assembly

Constituency details
- Country: India
- Region: Western India
- State: Maharashtra
- Established: 1955
- Abolished: 2008
- Total electors: 160,412

Panhala Assembly constituency was an assembly constituency in the India state of Maharashtra.

== Members of the Legislative Assembly ==
Election	Member	Party
1957	Babajirao Balasaheb Desai	Independent politician
1962	Sadashiva Daulatrao Patil	Peasants and Workers Party of India
1967	D. Y. Patil	Indian National Congress
1972	D. Y. Patil	Indian National Congress
1978	Yeshwantrao Eknath Patil	Indian National Congress
1980	Yeshwantrao Eknath Patil	Independent politician
1985	Yeshwantrao Eknath Patil	Indian National Congress
1990	Yeshwantrao Eknath Patil	Indian National Congress
1995	Yeshwantrao Eknath Patil	Indian National Congress
1999	Vinay Vilasrao Kore	Nationalist Congress Party
2004	Vinay Vilasrao Kore	Jan Surajya Shakti

== Election results ==
=== Assembly Election 2004 ===
2004 Maharashtra Legislative Assembly election : Panhala
Party	Candidate	Votes	%	±%
JSS	Vinay Vilasrao Kore	66,256	48.94%	New
NCP	Patil Yeshwant Eknath	56,525	41.75%	▼11.46
SS	Jayendra Ravrane	10,298	7.61%	▼1.96
BSP	Krishnat Sitaram Chougule Dattaram	2,306	1.70%	New
Margin of victory		9,731	7.19%	▼8.97
Turnout		1,35,389	84.40%	▲7.09
Total valid votes		1,35,385		
Registered electors		1,60,412		▲9.57
JSS gain from NCP		Swing	▼4.27	

=== Assembly Election 1999 ===
1999 Maharashtra Legislative Assembly election : Panhala
Party	Candidate	Votes	%	±%
NCP	Vinay Vilasrao Kore	58,322	53.21%	New
INC	Patil Yeshwant Eknath	40,608	37.05%	▼4.57
SS	Ashokrao Shankarrao Patil (Tatya)	10,484	9.56%	▼11.15
Margin of victory		17,714	16.16%	▲2.36
Turnout		1,13,182	77.31%	▲1.02
Total valid votes		1,09,614		
Registered electors		1,46,397		▲0.68
NCP gain from INC		Swing	▲11.59	

=== Assembly Election 1995 ===
1995 Maharashtra Legislative Assembly election : Panhala
Party	Candidate	Votes	%	±%
INC	Patil Yeshwant Eknath	46,162	41.61%	▼23.75
Independent	Kore Nipun Vilasrao	30,851	27.81%	New
SS	Ashokarao Shankarrao Patil (Tatya)	22,979	20.71%	▼10.79
Independent	D. S. Kamble	5,619	5.07%	New
Independent	Kambale Aba Pandurang	2,499	2.25%	New
Independent	S. P. Kamble	1,794	1.62%	New
Independent	B. B. Pawar	767	0.69%	New
Margin of victory		15,311	13.80%	▼20.05
Turnout		1,14,558	78.78%	▲5.76
Total valid votes		1,10,935		
Registered electors		1,45,406		▲12.06
INC hold		Swing	▼23.75	

=== Assembly Election 1990 ===
1990 Maharashtra Legislative Assembly election : Panhala
Party	Candidate	Votes	%	±%
INC	Yeshwant Alias Dada Eknath Patil	59,821	65.36%	▲9.77
SS	Ashokarao Shankarrao Patil (Tatya)	28,837	31.51%	New
JD	Subhashrao D. Kore (Dada)	2,523	2.76%	New
Margin of victory		30,984	33.85%	▲14.46
Turnout		93,080	71.73%	▼0.15
Total valid votes		91,521		
Registered electors		1,29,763		▲19.57
INC hold		Swing	▲9.77	

=== Assembly Election 1985 ===
1985 Maharashtra Legislative Assembly election : Panhala
Party	Candidate	Votes	%	±%
INC	Patil Yeshwant Eknath	42,640	55.59%	New
IC(S)	Patil Dattatray Ramchandra	27,761	36.19%	New
Independent	Bhogaokar Gajanan Shankarrao	3,623	4.72%	New
Independent	Gurav Manajirao Raghoji	1,310	1.71%	New
Independent	Shinde Suresh Harishchandra	1,035	1.35%	New
Margin of victory		14,879	19.40%	▼16.75
Turnout		78,179	72.04%	▲8.04
Total valid votes		76,703		
Registered electors		1,08,522		▲12.28
INC gain from Independent		Swing	▼1.89	

=== Assembly Election 1980 ===
1980 Maharashtra Legislative Assembly election : Panhala
Party	Candidate	Votes	%	±%
Independent	Yeshwant Eknath Patil	34,800	57.48%	New
INC(I)	D. Y. Patil	12,913	21.33%	New
INC(U)	Yeshwant Dnyandeo Patil	7,613	12.57%	New
Independent	Gurao Manajirao Raghoji	4,578	7.56%	New
Independent	Kamble Mahadeo Santu	641	1.06%	New
Margin of victory		21,887	36.15%	▲5.68
Turnout		61,761	63.90%	▼9.35
Total valid votes		60,545		
Registered electors		96,650		▲5.18
Independent gain from INC		Swing	▲4.97	

=== Assembly Election 1978 ===
1978 Maharashtra Legislative Assembly election : Panhala
Party	Candidate	Votes	%	±%
INC	Yeshwant Eknath Patil	34,735	52.51%	▼13.70
JP	Shankarrao Dattatraya Patil (Shingnapurkar)	14,580	22.04%	New
Independent	Yeshwant Dnyandeo Patil	9,349	14.13%	New
PWPI	Shankarrao Tukaram Patil	5,080	7.68%	▼14.25
Independent	Yadav Ramakant Ramchandra	887	1.34%	New
Independent	Desai Dnyanu Raghu	859	1.30%	New
Independent	Gurao Manajirao Raghoji	659	1.00%	New
Margin of victory		20,155	30.47%	▼13.80
Turnout		68,060	74.07%	▲7.97
Total valid votes		66,149		
Registered electors		91,888		▲5.40
INC hold		Swing	▼13.70	

=== Assembly Election 1972 ===
1972 Maharashtra Legislative Assembly election : Panhala
Party	Candidate	Votes	%	±%
INC	D. Y. Patil	36,951	66.21%	▲15.31
PWPI	Sadashiv Daulatrao Patil	12,242	21.93%	▼15.97
Independent	Raorane Yashwant Ravaji	4,287	7.68%	New
RPI	Kale Sahadev Masoji	1,433	2.57%	New
Independent	Malve Ramchandra Krishna	899	1.61%	New
Margin of victory		24,709	44.27%	▲31.28
Turnout		58,154	66.70%	▼0.10
Total valid votes		55,812		
Registered electors		87,182		▲13.08
INC hold		Swing	▲15.31	

=== Assembly Election 1967 ===
1967 Maharashtra Legislative Assembly election : Panhala
Party	Candidate	Votes	%	±%
INC	D. Y. Patil	25,158	50.89%	▲4.95
PWPI	Sadashiva Daulatrao Patil	18,735	37.90%	▼16.16
Independent	B. B. Patil	5,540	11.21%	New
Margin of victory		6,423	12.99%	▲4.88
Turnout		53,811	69.80%	▲17.13
Total valid votes		49,433		
Registered electors		77,098		▲26.11
INC gain from PWPI		Swing	▼3.16	

=== Assembly Election 1962 ===
1962 Maharashtra Legislative Assembly election : Panhala
Party	Candidate	Votes	%	±%
PWPI	Sadashiva Daulatrao Patil	15,529	54.06%	▲20.65
INC	Babajirao Balasaheb Desai	13,198	45.94%	▲23.87
Margin of victory		2,331	8.11%	▲3.91
Turnout		31,683	51.82%	▼1.75
Total valid votes		28,727		
Registered electors		61,136		▲9.83
PWPI gain from Independent		Swing	▲16.45	

=== Assembly Election 1957 ===
1957 Bombay State Legislative Assembly election : Panhala
Party	Candidate	Votes	%	±%
Independent	Desai Babajirao Balasaheb	10,202	37.61%	New
PWPI	Patil Sadashivrao Doulatrao	9,062	33.40%	New
INC	Mane Shankarrao Dattatraya	5,987	22.07%	New
Independent	Patil Bapu Ganapat	1,877	6.92%	New
Margin of victory		1,140	4.20%	New
Turnout		27,128	48.74%	New
Total valid votes		27,128		
Registered electors		55,663		New
Independent gain from PWPI		Swing		
