= Belunki =

Village in Maharashtra

- village
- Location in Maharashtra, India Belunki (India)
- Coordinates: 16.420268°N 74.323802°E
- Country: India
- State: Maharashtra
- District: Kolhapur district
- Elevation: 600 m (2,000 ft)

Languages
  - Official: Marathi
- Time zone: UTC+5:30 (IST)

Belunki is a small village near Khadakewada in Kagal tehsil, Kolhapur district, Maharashtra, India. The population is around 600. It is situated on banks of the river Chikotra.

== History ==
The village was established by two brothers, Sakhoji and Sultanji Patil, who obtained 85 acres of land from the British Raj. Over time they attracted residents and formed a village. Most of the villagers are farmers.

== Facilities ==
The Balu Mama temple is newly constructed on the same site where there used to be a Maruti temple. There is one primary school for the first two grades.
