= Dajiba Desai =

Indian politician

Member of Parliament, Lok Sabha
- In office 1977-1980
- Preceded by: Rajaram Nimbalkar
- Succeeded by: Udaysingrao Gaikwad
- Constituency: Kolhapur, Maharashtra

Member of Parliament, Rajya Sabha
- In office 1960-1966
- Constituency: Maharashtra

Personal details
- Born: 15 September 1925 Gunji, Belgaum district, British India
- Died: 25 March 1985 (aged 59)
- Party: Peasants and Workers Party of India
- Spouse: Lila Desai
- Children: 1 Son

Dajiba Balwantrao Desai was an Indian politician. He was elected to the Lok Sabha, lower house of the Parliament of India from Kolhapur, Maharashtra as a member of the Peasants and Workers Party of India.
