= H. P. Gandhi =

Indian phycologist and diatomist

Hemendrakumar Privithiraj Gandhi
- Born: 20 September 1920; Rajasthan
- Died: 5 June 2008 (aged 87); Junagadh, Gujarat
- Citizenship: Indian
- Known for: Pioneering work on Indian diatoms
- Scientific career
- Fields: Diatom taxonomy, diatom ecology, fossil diatoms, plant taxonomy

Hemendrakumar Prithivraj Gandhi (born 20 August 1920, Pratapgarh, Rajasthan; died 5 June 2008) was a pioneering Indian phycologist and diatomist. H P Gandhi did his primary and higher secondary schooling at Pratapgarh and obtained his intermediate degree from Agra. Later, he completed his bachelor's degree and Masters in Botany from the Wilson College, Mumbai in 1949, where he specialized in algae under the supervision of leading phycologist Prof. A. Ella Gonzales. Gandhi joined as an assistant lecturer at Karnatak University (earlier known as Karnatak College), Dharwar in July 1949 and very soon he was transferred unceremoniously to M N College, Visnagar in Gujarat (August 1949), then to I Y College, Bombay (November 1949), and after another short time period he joined Rajaram College, Kolhapur after which he finally returned to Karnatak College (June 1951). With the bifurcation of Bombay Presidency, in 1956, Gandhi was again transferred to Gujarat . His keen interest in the subject made him to collect algal samples from all the possible places and habitats during these transfers, tours and botanical excursions. He retired, in the year 1980, from J.J. Science College, Gujarat from the office of Principal.

== List of new diatom taxa, described by H P Gandhi ==
- Achnanthes elata (Leud.Fort) Gandhi 1960
- Achnanthes fasciata Gandhi 1959
- Achnanthes jogensis Gandhi 1959
- Achnanthes submontana Gandhi 1959
- Achnanthes baltalensis Gandhi 1983
- Ceratoneis iyengarii 1972
- Ceratoneis jogensis Gandhi 1959
- Cymbella powaiana Gandhi 1960
- Cymbella psudocuspidata 1959
- Cymbella rivularis Gandhi 1959
- Cymbella sagarensis Gandhi 1959
- Diploneissubsmithii Gandhi 1959
- Eunotia cholnokyi Gandhi 1959
- Eunotia jogensis Gandhi 1959
- Eunotia Montana Gandhi = E. ambigua 1959
- Eunotia nehruii Gandhi 1959
- Eunotia patrickii Gandhi 1959
- Eunotia porcelloides Gandhi 1959
- Eunotia rivularis Gandhi 1959
- Eunotia saravathense Gandhi 1959
- Eunotia subgibba Gandhi 1959
- Eunotia sublunaris Gandhi 1959
- Eunotia tumida Gandhi 1959
- Frustulia indica Gandhi 1959
- Frustulia jogensis Gandhi 1970
- Gomphonema clavatoides Gandhi 1960
- Gomphonema lacus-rankala Gandhi 1960
- Gomphonema magnifica Gandhi 1960
- Gomphonema moniliformae Gandhi 1960
- Gomphonema sarvathense Gandhi 1959
- Gomphonema spicula Gandhi 1959
- Gomphonema spiculoides Gandhi 1960
- Gomphonema submalayense Gandhi 1959
- Gomphonema tenius Gandhi 1960
- Hantzschia boriviliana Gandhi 1984
- Hantzschia voigtii Gandhi 1959
- Navicula avenaceoides Gandhi 1959
- Navicula chandolensis Gandhi 1959
- Navicula cholnokyii Gandhi 1959
- Navicula fridrrichii Gandhi 1960
- Navicula inflata Gandhi 1959
- Navicula jogensis Gandhi 1959
- Navicula mugadensis Gandhi 1959
- Navicula panhalgarhensis Gandhi 1959
- Navicula ramosissimoides Gandhi 1959
- Navicula reimeri Gandhi 1959
- Navicula subbengalensis Gandhi 1959
- Navicula subdapaliformis Gandhi 1970
- Navicula subdigna Gandhi 1959
- Navicula thienemonnioides Gandhi 1959
- Navicula vanhoeffeniformis Gandhi 1959
- Navicula viriduloides 1959
- Neidium capitellata Gandhi 1959
- Neidium grandis Gandhi 1959
- Neidium indicum Gonzalves et Gandhi 1954
- Neidium jogensis Gandhi 1959
- Neidium panhalgarhensis Gandhi 1959
- Nitzschia clausiiformis Gandhi 1959
- Nitzschia graciloides Gandhi 1959
- Nitzschia pseudogracilis Gandhi 1959
- Pinnularia balatoneis (Pant.) Gandhi 1960
- Pinnularia conica Gandhi. 1957
- Pinnularia divergentissimoides Gandhi 1959
- Pinnularia dolosa Gandhi 1960
- Pinnularia dubiasa Gandhi. 1959
- Pinnularia karnatica Gandhi 1957
- Pinnularia kolhapurensis Gandhi 1958
- Pinnularia lonavlensis Gandhi 1962
- Pinnularia mysorense Gandhi 1959
- Pinnularia panhalgarhensis Gandhi 1959
- Pinnularia paucicostis Gandhi 1959
- Pinnularia pseudoluculenta Gandhi 1960
- Pinnularia pusslia Gandhi 1959
- Pinnularia sagittata Gandhi 1959
- Pinnularia sahyadrens Gandhi 1959
- Pinnularia simplex Gandhi 1960
- Pinnularia subgraciloides Gandhi 1959
- Pinnularia subsimilis Gandhi 1959
- Stauroneis angulare Gonzalves et Gandhi 1952
- Stauroneis tenuis Gandhi 1959
- Surirella capronioides Gandhi 1959
- Surirella shyamaii Gandhi 1959
- Synedra chandolensis Gandhi 1959
- Synedra jogensis Gandhi 1964

== Publications of H P Gandhi ==
1. Gonzalves, E. A & Gandhi, H. P. 1952. A systematic account of the Diatoms of Bombay and Salsette – Part I. Journal of the Indian Botanical Society 31: 117–151.
2. Gonzalves, E. A & Gandhi, H. P. 1953. A systematic account of the Diatoms of Bombay and Salsette – II. Journal of the Indian Botanical Society 32: 239–263.
3. Gonzalves, E. A & Gandhi, H. P. 1954. A systematic account of the Diatoms of Bombay and Salsette – III. Journal of the Indian Botanical Society 33: 338–350.
4. Gandhi, H.P. 1955. A contribution to our knowledge of the freshwater Diatoms of Pratapgarh, Rajasthan. Journal of the Indian Botanical Society 34: 304–338.
5. Gandhi, H.P. 1956. A contribution to the freshwater Diatomaceae of S. Western India¬ - I. Freshwater diatoms of Dharwar. Journal of the Indian Botanical Society 35: 194–202.
6. Gandhi, H.P. 1956. A preliminary account of the soil diatom of Kolhapur. Journal of the Indian Botanical Society 35: 402–408.
7. Gandhi, H.P. 1957. The freshwater diatoms from Radhanagari – Kolhapur. Ceylon Journal of Science (Biology Section) 1: 45–47.
8. Gandhi, H.P. 1957. Some common freshwater diatoms from Gersoppa-falls (Jog-Falls). Journal of the Poona University, Science Section 12: 13–21.
9. Gandhi, H.P. 1957. A contribution to our knowledge of the diatom genus Pinnularia. Journal of the Bombay Natural History Society 54: 845–853.
10. Gandhi, H.P. 1958. Freshwater diatoms from Kolhapur and its immediate environs. Journal of the Bombay Natural History Society 55: 493–511.
11. Gandhi, H.P. 1958. The freshwater diatoms flora of the Hirebhasgar Dam area, Mysore State. Journal of the Indian Botanical Society 37: 249–265.
12. Gandhi, H. P., 1958. Flowering plants (Angiosperms) of Ahmedabad and its immediate vicinity. Vidya. Journal of the Gujarat University 2(2): 114–158.
13. Gandhi, H.P. 1959. The freshwater diatom flora from Mugad, Dharwar District with some ecological notes. Ceylon Journal of Science (Biology Section) 2: 98–116.
14. Gandhi, H.P., 1959. Freshwater diatoms from Sagar in the Mysore State. Journal of the Indian Botanical Society 38: 305–331.
15. Gandhi, H.P. 1959. Freshwater diatom flora of the Panhalgarh Hill Fort in the Kolaphur district. Hydrobiologia 14: 93–129.
16. Gandhi, H.P. 1959. Notes on the Diatomaceae from Ahmedabad and its environs-II. On the diatom flora of fountain reservoirs of the Victoria Gardens. Hydrobiologia 14: 130–146.
17. Gandhi, H.P. 1960. Some new diatoms from the Jog Falls, Mysore State. Journal of the Royal Microscopical Society 79: 81–84.
18. Gandhi, H.P. 1960. The diatom flora of the Bombay and Salsette Islands. Journal of the Bombay Natural History Society 57: 78–123.
19. Gandhi, H.P. 1960. On the diatom flora of some ponds around Vasna Village near Ahmedabad. Journal of the Indian Botanical Society 39: 558–567.
20. Gandhi, H.P. 1961. Notes on the Diatomaceae of Ahmedabad and its environs. Hydrobiologia 17: 218–236.
21. Gandhi, H.P. 1962. The diatom flora of the Bombay and Salsette islands. II. Nova Hedwigia 3: 469–505.
22. Gandhi, H.P. 1962. Some freshwater diatoms from Lonawala Hill Station in the Bombay State (Maharashtra). Hydrobiologia 20: 128–154.
23. Gandhi, H.P. 1962. Notes on the Diatomaceae from Ahmedabad and its environs-IV ¬The diatom communities of some freshwater pools and ditches along Sarkhej Road. Phykos 1: 115–127.
24. Gandhi, H.P. 1964. The diatom flora of Chandola and Kankaria Lakes. Nova Hedwigia 8: 347–402.
25. Gandhi, H.P. 1966. Freshwater diatom flora of Jog Falls, Mysore State. Nova Hedwigia 11: 89–197.
26. Gandhi, H.P. 1967. Notes on Diatomaceae from Ahmedabad and its environs. VI. On some diatoms from fountain reservoirs of Seth Sarabhai's Garden. Hydrobiologia 30: 248–272.
27. Gandhi, H.P. 1970. A further contribution to the diatom flora of the Jog Falls, Mysore State. Nova Hedwigia 31: 633–652.
28. Gandhi, H. P., Kachhi I. H. & Buch M. P., 1974. Occurrence of Ophioglossum fibrosum Schum. at Junagadh in Saurashtra. Journal of the Bombay Natural History Society 72: 878.
29. Gandhi, H. P., D. J. Mohan and A B. Vora 1983. Preliminary observation on Baltal and Ara sediments, Kashmir. Proceedings of the Xth Indian Colloquium on Micropalaeontology & Stratigraphy: 555–570.
30. Gandhi, H. P. & D. J. Mohan, 1983. Fossil diatoms from Baltal, Kashmir. Man & Environment 7: 154–156.
31. Gandhi, H. P., A B. Vora & D. J. Mohan, 1983. Review of the fossil Diatomflora, of the Karewa Beds of Kashmir. Current Trends in Geology, Vol. VI (Climate and Geology of Kashmir) 6:57—60.
32. Gandhi, H. P., A B. Vora & D. J. Mohan, 1983. Fossil diatoms from Baltal, Karewa beds of Kashmir. Current Trends in Geology, Vol. VI (Climate and Geology of Kashmir) 6:61—68.
33. Gandhi, H. P., A B. Vora & D. J. Mohan, 1986. Ecology of diatoms from the Karewa beds of Baltal area, Kashmir, India., Proceedings of the Xth Indian Colloquium on Micropalaeontology & Stratigraphy, Bulletin of Geological, Mining & Metallurgical Society of India, Pt. II (Stratigraphy & Microflora) No. 54: 159–161.
34. Gandhi, H. P., 1990. My work on Indian Freshwater Diatoms and Experiences with Indian Referees and Editors. In O. N. Srivastava & Madhavi Srivastava (eds) Glimpses of Phycology in India. Today & Tomorrow's Publishers, New Delhi.
35. Gandhi, H. P. 1998. Freshwater Diatoms of Central Gujarat. Bishen Singh Mahendra Pal Singh. Dehra Dun.
