= Ruturaj Patil =

Indian politician

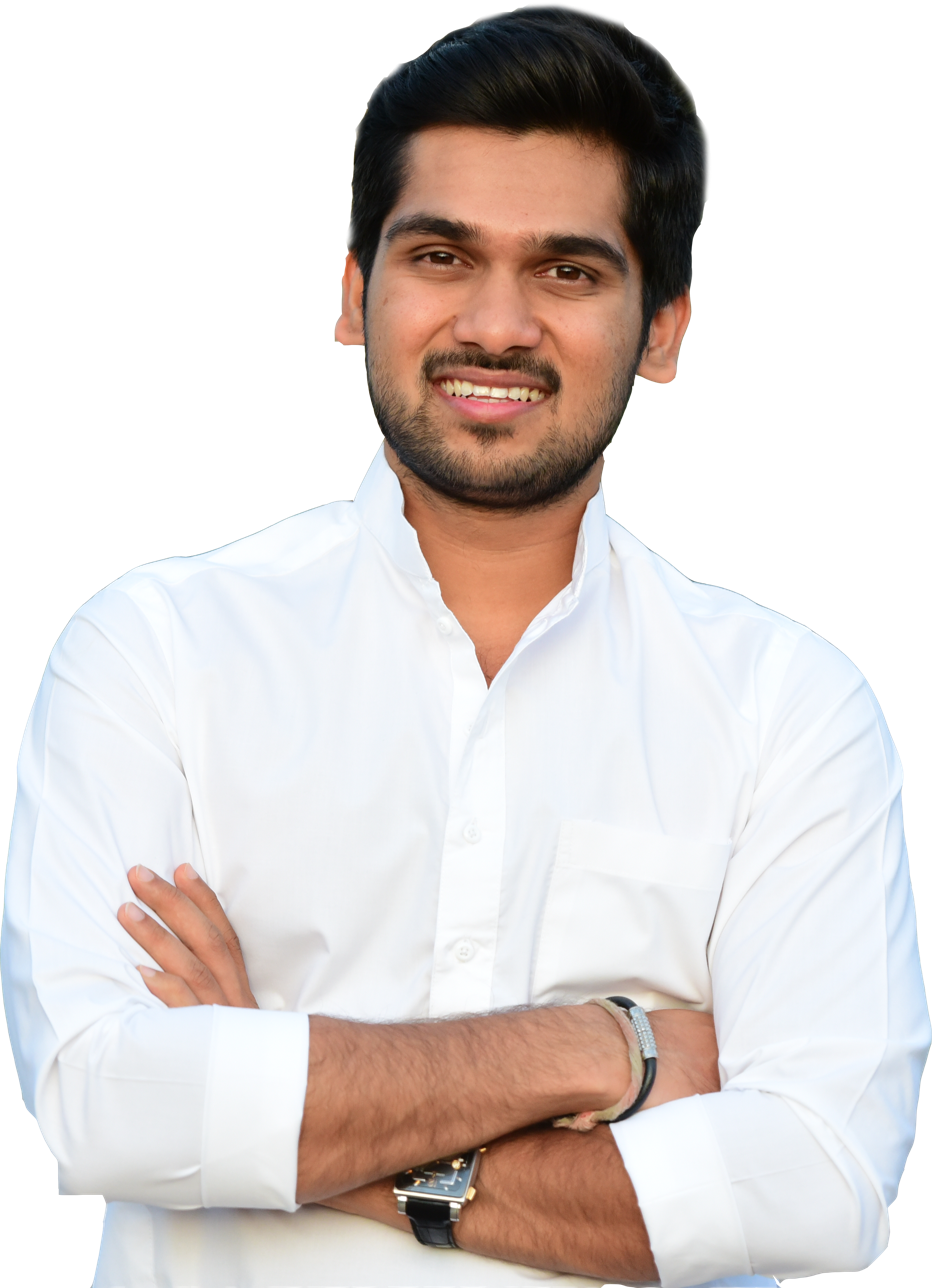

Member of Maharashtra Legislative Assembly
- In office 24 October 2019 - 26 November 2024
- Preceded by: Amal Mahadik
- Succeeded by: Amal Mahadik
- Constituency: Kolhapur South

Personal details
- Born: 31 May 1990 (age 36) Kolhapur, Maharashtra, India
- Party: Indian National Congress
- Relatives: D. Y. Patil (grandfather); Sanjay D Y Patil (father); Satej Patil (uncle); Ajeenkya D Y Patil (uncle)
- Occupation: Businessman; Politician; Social activist

Ruturaj Sanjay Patil is an Indian Politician from Kolhapur District. He is the Former Member of the Maharashtra Legislative Assembly (2019–2024) from Kolhapur South. He is the grandson of D. Y. Patil.

== Personal life ==
Ruturaj Patil was born on 31 May 1990 in Kolhapur , he is the grandson of D. Y. Patil and nephew of senior Congress leader and former Minister Satej Patil.

Ruturaj Patil completed his early education at St. Xavier’s School, Kolhapur. Later on, he completed his graduation from Mumbai followed by a post graduate certification from LeHigh University Pennsylvania, USA.

Ruturaj Patil is married to Pooja More Patil since February 2019, the couple welcomed a baby in March 2020.

== Political Career ==
While in college he won 2007 Shivaji University Student Election.

He was elected as a member of Maharashtra Legislative Assembly in 2019 from Kolhapur South Assembly constituency on an INC ticket. He defeated BJP candidate Amal Mahadik by a significant margin.

In 2024 he contested again from Kolhapur South on INC ticket but lost to Amal Mahadik.
