= Shahuwadi Assembly constituency =

Constituency of the Maharashtra legislative assembly in India

Coordinates: 16.91°N 73.95°E

Shahuwadi
- Constituency No. 277 for the Maharashtra Legislative Assembly

Constituency details
- Country: India
- Region: Western India
- State: Maharashtra
- District: Kolhapur
- Lok Sabha constituency: Hatkanangle
- Established: 1952
- Total electors: 307,491
- Reservation: None

Member of Legislative Assembly
- 15th Maharashtra Legislative Assembly
- Incumbent Vinay Kore
- Party: JSS
- Alliance: NDA
- Elected year: 2024

Shahuwadi Assembly constituency is one of the 288 Vidhan Sabha (legislative assembly) constituencies of Maharashtra state, western India. This constituency is located in Kolhapur district, and is a part of Hatkanangle Lok Sabha constituency.

== Geographical scope ==
The constituency comprises Shauwadi Taluka, Kodoli, Kotoli, Panhala revenue circles and Panhala Municipal Council belonging to Panhala taluka.

== Members of the Legislative Assembly ==
Election	Member	Party
1952	Rangrao Namdeo Patil	Peasants and Workers Party of India
1957	Tryambak Sitaram Karkhanis	Peasants and Workers Party of India
1962	Udaysingrao Nanasaheb Gaikwad	Indian National Congress
1967	Rau Dhondi Patil (Aaba)	Peasants and Workers Party of India
1972	Udaysingrao Nanasaheb Gaikwad	Indian National Congress
1978	Udaysingrao Nanasaheb Gaikwad	Indian National Congress
1980	Babasaheb Yeshwantrao Patil Sarudkar	Indian National Congress
1985	Sanjaysing Jaysingrao Gaikwad	Independent politician
1990	Babasaheb Yeshwantrao Patil Sarudkar	Shiv Sena
1995	Sanjaysing Jayasingrao Gaikwad	Independent politician
1999	Sanjaysing Jayasingrao Gaikwad	Indian National Congress
2000 By-election	Sanjaysing Jayasingrao Gaikwad	Indian National Congress
2004	Satyajeet (Aaba) Babasaheb Patil Sarudkar	Shiv Sena
2009	Dr. Vinay Vilasrao Kore	Jan Surajya Shakti
2014	Satyajeet (Aaba) Babasaheb Patil Sarudkar	Shiv Sena
2019	Dr. Vinay Vilasrao Kore	Jan Surajya Shakti
2024	Dr. Vinay Vilasrao Kore	Jan Surajya Shakti

== Election results ==
=== Assembly Election 2024 ===
2024 Maharashtra Legislative Assembly election : Shahuwadi
Party	Candidate	Votes	%	±%
JSS	Dr. Vinay Vilasrao Kore	136,064	55.81	▲1.65
SS(UBT)	Satyajeet (Aaba) Babasaheb Patil Sarudkar	100,011	41.03	New
NOTA	None of the above	574	0.24	▼0.17
Margin of victory		36,053	14.79	▲2.70
Turnout		244,352	79.47	▼0.75
Total valid votes		243,778		
Registered electors		307,491		▲6.45
JSS hold		Swing	▲1.65	

=== Assembly Election 2019 ===
2019 Maharashtra Legislative Assembly election : Shahuwadi
Party	Candidate	Votes	%	±%
JSS	Dr. Vinay Vilasrao Kore	124,868	54.16	▲18.50
SS	Satyajeet (Aaba) Babasaheb Patil Sarudkar	97,005	42.07	▲6.22
VBA	Dr. Sunil Namdev Patil	2,902	1.26	New
PWPI	Bhai Bharat Rangrao Patil	1,953	0.85	New
NOTA	None of the above	942	0.41	▼0.08
Margin of victory		27,863	12.09	▲11.90
Turnout		231,705	80.22	▲2.46
Total valid votes		230,553		
Registered electors		288,852		▲7.16
JSS gain from SS		Swing	▲18.31	

=== Assembly Election 2014 ===
2014 Maharashtra Legislative Assembly election : Shahuwadi
Party	Candidate	Votes	%	±%
SS	Satyajeet (Aaba) Babasaheb Patil Sarudkar	74,702	35.85	▲2.03
JSS	Dr. Vinay Vilasrao Kore	74,314	35.66	▼2.44
SWP	Amarsinh Yashwantrao Patil (Bhau)	27,953	13.41	New
INC	Karnsinh Sanjaysinh Gaikwad (Bal)	21,443	10.29	▼11.62
NCP	Babasaheb Panditrao Patil (Asurlekar)	4,671	2.24	New
MNS	Sanjay Shamrao Patil	1,431	0.69	New
NOTA	None of the above	1,024	0.49	New
Margin of victory		388	0.19	▼4.09
Turnout		209,595	77.76	▼2.32
Total valid votes		208,388		
Registered electors		269,543		▲11.23
SS gain from JSS		Swing	▼2.25	

=== Assembly Election 2009 ===
2009 Maharashtra Legislative Assembly election : Shahuwadi
Party	Candidate	Votes	%	±%
JSS	Dr. Vinay Vilasrao Kore	73,912	38.10	▲11.40
SS	Satyajeet (Aaba) Babasaheb Patil Sarudkar	65,601	33.82	▼2.06
INC	Karnsinh Sanjaysinh Gaikwad (Bal)	42,510	21.91	▼9.42
Independent	Vinay Nivrutti Tile	4,375	2.26	New
Independent	Yedage Raju Janardan	1,864	0.96	New
BSP	Dr. Sandip Prabhakar Patil (Gundkalle)	1,643	0.85	▼0.11
Margin of victory		8,311	4.28	▼0.27
Turnout		194,074	80.08	▼3.18
Total valid votes		193,980		
Registered electors		242,339		▲41.66
JSS gain from SS		Swing	▲2.22	

=== Assembly Election 2004 ===
2004 Maharashtra Legislative Assembly election : Shahuwadi
Party	Candidate	Votes	%	±%
SS	Satyajeet (Aaba) Babasaheb Patil Sarudkar	51,075	35.88	▲26.08
INC	Karnsinh Sanjaysinh Gaikwad (Bal)	44,600	31.33	▼14.71
JSS	Mansingrao Udaysingrao Gaikwad	38,003	26.70	New
Independent	Gaikwad Kiran Vasant	3,123	2.19	New
PWPI	Bhai Bharat Rangrao Patil	2,313	1.62	New
Rashtriya Samajik Nayak Paksha	Krishna Bandu Lohar (Maharaj)	1,876	1.32	New
BSP	Kesare Pandurang Krushna	1,365	0.96	New
Margin of victory		6,475	4.55	▲1.11
Turnout		142,438	83.26	▲9.04
Total valid votes		142,355		
Registered electors		171,070		▲5.88
SS gain from INC		Swing	▼10.16	

=== Assembly By-election 2000 ===
2000 Maharashtra Legislative Assembly by-election : Shahuwadi
Party	Candidate	Votes	%	±%
INC	Sanjaysing Jayasingrao Gaikwad	55,209	46.04	▼0.93
Independent	Babasaheb Yeshwantrao Patil Sarudkar	51,088	42.61	New
SS	Ramesh Kondiram Latke	11,746	9.80	▲1.43
Independent	G. Sanjeevani Ananda	1,864	1.55	New
Margin of victory		4,121	3.44	▼1.47
Turnout		119,911	74.22	▼1.06
Total valid votes		119,907		
Registered electors		161,567		▲1.35
INC hold		Swing	▼0.93	

=== Assembly Election 1999 ===
1999 Maharashtra Legislative Assembly election : Shahuwadi
Party	Candidate	Votes	%	±%
INC	Sanjaysing Jayasingrao Gaikwad	54,108	46.97	▲9.76
NCP	Babasaheb Yeshwantrao Patil Sarudkar	48,451	42.06	New
SS	Jayawantrao Bandu Katkar	9,636	8.37	▲2.27
Independent	Gaikwad Sanjayasinh Shamraoji	1,664	1.44	New
Independent	Patil Babasaheb Yeshawantrao	999	0.87	New
Margin of victory		5,657	4.91	▼5.12
Turnout		120,000	75.28	▼5.01
Total valid votes		115,190		
Registered electors		159,413		▲0.63
INC gain from Independent		Swing	▼0.26	

=== Assembly Election 1995 ===
1995 Maharashtra Legislative Assembly election : Shahuwadi
Party	Candidate	Votes	%	±%
Independent	Sanjaysing Jayasingrao Gaikwad	58,640	47.23	New
INC	Babasaheb Yeshwantrao Patil Sarudkar	46,192	37.21	▼9.79
SS	Gavali Sakharam Balu	7,569	6.10	▼44.53
BSP	Patil Bharat Rangarao	4,580	3.69	New
Independent	Patil Babaso Yashawant	2,959	2.38	New
Independent	Patil Shripati Arjuna	2,175	1.75	New
Margin of victory		12,448	10.03	▲6.40
Turnout		127,182	80.29	▲2.08
Total valid votes		124,148		
Registered electors		158,413		▲13.85
Independent gain from SS		Swing	▼3.40	

=== Assembly Election 1990 ===
1990 Maharashtra Legislative Assembly election : Shahuwadi
Party	Candidate	Votes	%	±%
SS	Babasaheb Yeshwantrao Patil Sarudkar	54,223	50.63	New
INC	Gaikwad Sanjaysing Jayasingrao	50,334	47.00	▲0.63
PWPI	Patil Bharat Rangrao	2,239	2.09	▼0.24
Margin of victory		3,889	3.63	▼1.30
Turnout		108,812	78.21	▲1.58
Total valid votes		107,103		
Registered electors		139,136		▲19.74
SS gain from Independent		Swing	▼0.67	

=== Assembly Election 1985 ===
1985 Maharashtra Legislative Assembly election : Shahuwadi
Party	Candidate	Votes	%	±%
Independent	Sanjaysing Jayasingrao Gaikwad	44,771	51.30	New
INC	Babasaheb Yeshwantrao Patil Sarudkar	40,471	46.37	New
PWPI	Patil Keshav Kondi	2,036	2.33	▼18.18
Margin of victory		4,300	4.93	▼54.06
Turnout		89,041	76.63	▲22.88
Total valid votes		87,278		
Registered electors		116,200		▲7.60
Independent gain from INC(I)		Swing	▼28.19	

=== Assembly Election 1980 ===
1980 Maharashtra Legislative Assembly election : Shahuwadi
Party	Candidate	Votes	%	±%
INC(I)	Babasaheb Yeshwantrao Patil Sarudkar	44,864	79.49	New
PWPI	Rau Dhondi Patil	11,573	20.51	▲8.31
Margin of victory		33,291	58.99	▲8.12
Turnout		58,048	53.75	▼25.07
Total valid votes		56,437		
Registered electors		107,988		▲7.02
INC(I) gain from INC		Swing	▲10.16	

=== Assembly Election 1978 ===
1978 Maharashtra Legislative Assembly election : Shahuwadi
Party	Candidate	Votes	%	±%
INC	Udaysingrao Nanasaheb Gaikwad	53,625	69.33	▼12.75
JP	Patil Sadashiv Shankar	14,280	18.46	New
PWPI	Patil Rau Dhondi	9,438	12.20	▼5.72
Margin of victory		39,345	50.87	▼13.30
Turnout		79,532	78.82	▲3.92
Total valid votes		77,343		
Registered electors		100,905		▲21.78
INC hold		Swing	▼12.75	

=== Assembly Election 1972 ===
1972 Maharashtra Legislative Assembly election : Shahuwadi
Party	Candidate	Votes	%	±%
INC	Udaysingrao Nanasaheb Gaikwad	49,368	82.08	▲35.91
PWPI	Kumbhar Shankar Babu	10,776	17.92	▼30.88
Margin of victory		38,592	64.17	▲61.54
Turnout		62,059	74.90	▲3.31
Total valid votes		60,144		
Registered electors		82,859		▲17.43
INC gain from PWPI		Swing	▲33.28	

=== Assembly Election 1967 ===
1967 Maharashtra Legislative Assembly election : Shahuwadi
Party	Candidate	Votes	%	±%
PWPI	Rau Dhondi Patil	23,059	48.80	▲11.87
INC	Udaysingrao Nanasaheb Gaikwad	21,817	46.17	▼12.71
Independent	Dattatraya Govind Tambat	2,377	5.03	New
Margin of victory		1,242	2.63	▼19.32
Turnout		50,516	71.59	▲15.18
Total valid votes		47,253		
Registered electors		70,559		▲1.67
PWPI gain from INC		Swing	▼10.08	

=== Assembly Election 1962 ===
1962 Maharashtra Legislative Assembly election : Shahuwadi
Party	Candidate	Votes	%	±%
INC	Udaysingrao Nanasaheb Gaikwad	21,249	58.88	▲31.28
PWPI	Shankarrao Namdeo Patil	13,327	36.93	▼11.22
Independent	Vasudeo Govind Shiragaonkar	1,513	4.19	New
Margin of victory		7,922	21.95	▲1.40
Turnout		39,149	56.41	▲14.85
Total valid votes		36,089		
Registered electors		69,402		▲9.44
INC gain from PWPI		Swing	▲10.73	

=== Assembly Election 1957 ===
1957 Bombay State Legislative Assembly election : Shahuwadi
Party	Candidate	Votes	%	±%
PWPI	Karkhanis Tryambak Sitaram	12,689	48.15	▲16.97
INC	Tambat Dattatraya Govind	7,273	27.60	▲3.98
Independent	Patil Rangrao Namdeo	6,392	24.25	New
Margin of victory		5,416	20.55	▲13.00
Turnout		26,354	41.56	▼0.53
Total valid votes		26,354		
Registered electors		63,418		▲10.08
PWPI hold		Swing	▲16.97	

=== Assembly Election 1952 ===
1952 Bombay State Legislative Assembly election : Shahuwadi
Party	Candidate	Votes	%	±%
PWPI	Patil Rangrao Namdeo	7,560	31.18	New
INC	Chougule Rangarao Hari	5,728	23.62	New
Socialist	Patil Pandurang Keshavrao	3,943	16.26	New
Independent	Karkhanis Trimbak Sitaram	2,750	11.34	New
Independent	Patil Tukaram Ganpat	2,219	9.15	New
Independent	Kolvankar Sadashiv Gopal	2,049	8.45	New
Margin of victory		1,832	7.55	
Turnout		24,249	42.09	
Total valid votes		24,249		
Registered electors		57,613		
PWPI win (new seat)				
