= Sanjay Mandlik =

Indian politician

Sanjay Sadashivrao Mandlik

Member of Parliament, Lok Sabha
- In office 23 May 2019 – 04 June 2024
- Preceded by: Dhananjay Mahadik
- Constituency: Kolhapur

Chairman of Kolhapur Zilla Parishad
- In office 2012–2014

Personal details
- Born: India
- Party: Shiv Sena
- Relations: Sadashivrao Mandlik (Father)
- Children: Virendra Mandlik, Yashovardhan Mandlik, Samarjeet Mandlik
- Occupation: Politician
- Website: sanjaymandlik.com

Sanjay Sadashivrao Mandlik is an Indian politician and a Shiv Sena leader from Kolhapur district, Maharashtra. He is a member of the 17th Lok Sabha from Kolhapur constituency. He is son of Late Shri. Sadashivrao Mandlik who was elected as a Member of Parliament four times from Kolhapur constituency. Sanjay Mandlik is a chairman of Sadashivrao Mandlik Kagal Taluka Sahakari Sakhar Karkhana Ltd. which is located in Hamidawda in Kolhapur district.

== Positions held ==
- 2003 : Elected as president of Kolhapur District Co-operative Board
- 2012: Elected as Member of Kolhapur Zilla Parishad
- 2012: Elected as a chairman of Kolhapur Zilla Parishad
- 2014: Appointed as Saha-Samparkapramukh of a ShivSena Party
- 2015: Elected as director of Kolhapur District Central Cooperative Bank
- 2019: Elected as Member of 17th Lok Sabha
- 2022: Re-Elected as director of Kolhapur District Central Cooperative Bank
