= Amal Mahadik =

Indian politician

Member of the Maharashtra Legislative Assembly
- Incumbent
- Assumed office 23 November 2024
- Preceded by: Ruturaj Patil
- Constituency: Kolhapur South
- In office 2014–2019
- Preceded by: Satej Patil
- Succeeded by: Ruturaj Patil
- Constituency: Kolhapur South

Personal details
- Born: Amal Mahadevrao Mahadik; 8 April 1978 (age 48) Kolhapur, Maharashtra, India
- Party: Bharatiya Janata Party (After 2014)
- Other political affiliations: Indian National Congress (Before 2014)
- Parent: Mahadevrao (Appa) Mahadik (father)
- Relatives: Dhananjay Mahadik (cousin brother)
- Occupation: Politician
- Website: amalmahadik.in

Amal Mahadevrao Mahadik is an Indian politician and member of the Bharatiya Janata Party.

== Career ==
Amal Mahadik is a member of the Maharashtra Legislative Assembly from the Kolhapur South assembly constituency, Maharashtra. He first became the Member of Legislative Assembly by defeating sitting MLA and minister Satej Patil in 2014. He lost his seat to Ruturaj Patil (nephew of Satej Patil) in Assembly elections of 2019. In 2024 he won the seat by defeating Ruturaj Patil.

== Positions held ==
- Maharashtra Legislative Assembly MLA.
- Terms in office: 2014–2019.
- 2024: Maharashtra Legislative Assembly MLA

== Family ==
Amal Mahadik's father Mahadevrao Appa Mahadik is a member of the Maharashtra Legislative Council MLC from the Indian National Congress but, on 2015 he lost his seat to former minister Satej Patil. Satej Patil won MLC by 165 votes. His cousin Dhananjay Mahadik is Member of Parliament Rajya Sabha from Maharashtra, he is from the Bhartiya Janata Party. In 2019 election, Dhananjay Mahadik lost his seat to Shiv Sena MP Sanjay Sadashivrao Mandlik with the margin of 2,70,000 votes.
