= Shivaji Patil =

Indian politician

Member of the Maharashtra Legislative Assembly
- Incumbent
- Assumed office 23 November 2024
- Preceded by: Rajesh Narasingrao Patil
- Constituency: Chandgad

Personal details
- Profession: Politician

Shivaji Shattupa Patil (born 1969) is an Indian politician from Maharashtra. He is a member of the Maharashtra Legislative Assembly from Chandgad Assembly constituency in Kolhapur district representing as an independent politician. He won the 2024 Maharashtra Legislative Assembly election.

== Early life and education ==
Patil is from Chandgad, Kolhapur district, Maharashtra. He is the son of Shattuppa Ramchandra Patil. He passed Class 12 but later discontinued in 2009 while doing his B.A. at Yashwantrao Chauhan Open University, Nashik. He runs his own construction and transportation business along with his wife.

== Career ==
Patil won from Chandgad Assembly constituency as an independent candidate in the 2024 Maharashtra Legislative Assembly election. He polled 84,254 votes and defeated his nearest rival and sitting MLA, Rajesh Narsingrao Patil of Nationalist Congress Party, by a margin of 24,134 votes. During the victory celebrations, a fire broke out and some his followers were injured.
