= Murgud =

- city
- Location in Maharashtra, India
- Coordinates: 16.4°N 74.2°E
- Country: India
- State: Maharashtra
- District: Kolhapur
- Elevation: 556 m (1,824 ft)

Population (2025)
  - Total: 22,412

Languages
  - Official: Marathi
- Time zone: UTC+5:30 (IST)
- Postal code: 416219

Murgud is a city and a municipal council in Kolhapur district in the Indian state of Maharashtra.

== Geography ==
Murgud is located at 16.4°N 74.2°E. It has an average elevation of 556 metres (1824 feet).

The main water source for drinking and farming is Sarpirajirao lake. It is situated to the east of Murgud. The major crop in the Murgud area is sugarcane, as there is water available year-round. Murgud comes from a Kannada word meaning "three mountains", as the village is surrounded by three mountains.

== Demographics ==
As of the 2011 India census, Murgud had a population of 11,194. Males constitute 51% of the population and females 49%. Murgud has an average literacy rate of 73%, higher than the national average of 59.5%: male literacy is 81%, and female literacy is 64%. In Murgud, 11% of the population is under 6 years of age. Murgud has a historical background which dates back to 1600.

Out of the total population, 4,125 were engaged in work or business activity. Of this 2,990 were males while 1,135 were females. In census survey, worker is defined as person who does business, job, service, and cultivator and labour activity. Of total 4125 working population, 85.41% were engaged in Main Work while 14.59% of total workers were engaged in marginal work.

Murgud has an area of 11.71 km2 divided into 17 wards.
