= Satej Patil =

Minister of State (Home), Maharashtra

Satej D. Patil
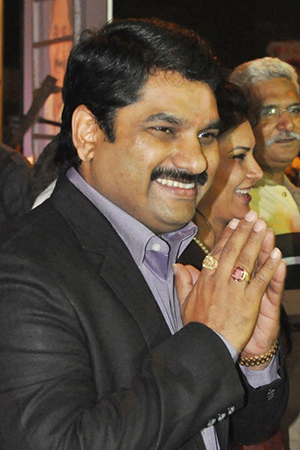
- Satej Patil

Minister of State Government of Maharashtra
- In office 30 December 2019 – 29 June 2022
- Minister: Home Affairs (Urban); Housing; Transport; Information Technology; Parliamentary Affairs; Ex. Servicemen Welfare; Rural Development Additional charge on 27 June 2022; State Excise Additional charge on 27 June 2022; Food and Drug Administration Additional charge on 27 June 2022; Water Resources Additional charge on 27 June 2022; Command Area Development Additional charge on 27 June 2022; Labour Additional charge on 27 June 2022
- Governor: Bhagat Singh Koshyari
- Chief Minister: Uddhav Thackeray
- Deputy CM: Ajit Pawar
- Guardian Minister: Kolhapur district
- In office 11 November 2010 – 26 September 2014
- Minister: Home Affairs (Urban & Rural); Rural Development; Food & Drugs Administration
- Governor: K Sankaranarayanan; C. Vidyasagar Rao
- Minister of State: Maharashtra Government
- Chief Minister: Ashokrao Chavan-Patil; Prithviraj Chavan-Patil

Member of Maharashtra Legislative Assembly
- In office 2009–2014
- Preceded by: Constituency created
- Succeeded by: Amal Mahadik
- Constituency: Kolhapur South
- In office 2004–2009
- Preceded by: Digvijay Bhausaheb Khanvikar
- Succeeded by: Chandradip Narke
- Constituency: Karvir

Member of Maharashtra Legislative Council
- Incumbent
- Assumed office 4 January 2016
- Preceded by: Mahadevrao Mahadik
- Constituency: Kolhapur Local Authorities constituency

Personal details
- Born: Satej Dyandeo Patil; 12 April 1972 (age 54) Kolhapur, Maharashtra, India
- Party: Indian National Congress
- Spouse: Pratima Patil
- Children: Tejas and Devashree
- Relatives: Dr. D. Y. Patil (Father); Ruturaj Patil (Nephew)
- Education: Shivaji University, Kolhapur
- Website: Satej Patil

Satej Dyandeo Patil (born 12 April 1972) is a Member of the Maharashtra Legislative Council from the Indian National Congress. He served as the Minister of State for Home (Urban), Housing, Transport, Information Technology, and Parliamentary Affairs. He previously served as Minister of State for Home (Urban & Rural), Rural Development, Food & Drugs Administration of Maharashtra in the UPA coalition government from 2010 to 2014. Like many of his contemporaries, Patil also followed his father Dr. D. Y. Patil in politics. Patil hails from the city of Kolhapur.

== Early life and family ==
Patil was born in a Maratha Patil Family which hails from Khandagale Marathas Clan. He is the son of D Y Patil who is the former Governor of Bihar state in eastern India. Patil studied at Shivaji University in Kolhapur. He was elected as Chairman of Shivaji University Student Council, Kolhapur in 1992-93 from NSUI. Patil started his career in public service when he was elected to the Kolhapur District Central cooperative Bank, 2001 as a Director from Gaganbawada Taluka, Kolhapur.

Satej is married to Pratima (daughter of Vijaykumar Govindrao Patil). They have two children, Tejas and Devashree. Satej's brother, Dr. Sanjay Patil is the president of D.Y. Patil Group.

== Political career ==
Patil was elected to the Legislative Assembly as an independent candidate in the elections held in 2004, and won with a margin of more than 42 thousand votes. He was again elected in the state assembly elections in 2009. He lost to Amal Mahadik in the state assembly elections in 2014. In the Maharashtra legislative council elections in 2015, Patil won the MLC seat by defeating the last three terms sitting MLC Mahadevrao Mahadik.

== Non-political positions held ==
Patil is the president of Shree Mouni Vidyapeeth, Gargoti, Kolhapur. He is Vice President of D. Y. Patil Education Society, Pune & Kolhapur and Kolhapur District Amateur Boxing Association, Kolhapur. He is also chairman of Padmashree Dr. D. Y. Patil Sahakari Sakhar Karkhana Ltd., Gaganbavada, Kolhapur and ex chairman of Shivaji University Students Council, Kolhapur (1992–93). He is director of Kolhapur District Central Co-Op. Bank Ltd., Kolhapur and Kolhapur Chamber of Commerce & Industries, Kolhapur. He is a member of many committees and organisations. He is president of the Kolhapur District Basketball Association.
