= Shigaon =

Village in Maharashtra

Coordinates: 14°59′N 75°13′E

Shigaon is a village in Sangli District, Maharashtra State, India. In 2011, it had a population of 6,844: 3,457 males and 3,387 females.
