= Kolhapur South Assembly constituency =

Constituency of the Maharashtra legislative assembly in India

Coordinates: 16.66°N 74.23°E

Kolhapur South
- Constituency No. 274 for the Maharashtra Legislative Assembly

Constituency details
- Country: India
- Region: Western India
- State: Maharashtra
- District: Kolhapur
- Lok Sabha constituency: Kolhapur
- Established: 2008
- Total electors: 373,192
- Reservation: None

Member of Legislative Assembly
- 15th Maharashtra Legislative Assembly
- Incumbent Amal Mahadik
- Party: BJP
- Alliance: NDA
- Elected year: 2024

Kolhapur South Assembly constituency is one of the 274 Vidhan Sabha (Assembly) constituencies of Maharashtra state in Western India. The constituency was established by the 2008 delimitation. It comprises parts of Karvir tehsil and parts of Kolhapur Municipal Corporation, both in Kolhapur district, and is a segment of the Kolhapur Lok Sabha constituency. As of 2024, it is represented by Amal Mahadik of the Bharatiya Janata Party party.

== Members of the Legislative Assembly ==
Year	Member	Party
Before 2009 : See Kolhapur
2009	Satej Patil	Indian National Congress
2014	Amal Mahadik	Bharatiya Janata Party
2019	Ruturaj Patil	Indian National Congress
2024	Amal Mahadik	Bharatiya Janata Party

== Election results ==
=== Assembly Election 2024 ===
2024 Maharashtra Legislative Assembly election : Kolhapur South
Party	Candidate	Votes	%	±%
BJP	Amal Mahadik	148,892	52.68	▲12.39
INC	Ruturaj Sanjay Patil	131,262	46.44	▼11.52
NOTA	None of the Above	1,672	0.59	▼0.21
Margin of victory		17,630	6.24	▼11.43
Turnout		284,301	76.18	▲1.36
Total valid votes		282,629		
Registered electors		373,192		▲14.84
BJP gain from INC		Swing	▼5.28	

=== Assembly Election 2019 ===
2019 Maharashtra Legislative Assembly election : Kolhapur South
Party	Candidate	Votes	%	±%
INC	Ruturaj Sanjay Patil	140,103	57.96	▲13.04
BJP	Amal Mahadik	97,394	40.29	▼8.58
VBA	Babanrao Kavde	2,219	0.92	New
NOTA	None of the Above	1,939	0.80	▼0.17
Margin of victory		42,709	17.67	▲13.72
Turnout		243,822	75.03	▲4.92
Total valid votes		241,706		
Registered electors		324,981		▲4.58
INC gain from BJP		Swing	▲9.09	

=== Assembly Election 2014 ===
2014 Maharashtra Legislative Assembly election : Kolhapur South
Party	Candidate	Votes	%	±%
BJP	Amal Mahadik	105,489	48.87	▲43.64
INC	Satej Dyandeo Patil	96,961	44.92	▼0.56
SS	Vijay Shamrao Devane	9,048	4.19	New
NOTA	None of the Above	2,102	0.97	New
MNS	Raju Aanadrao Dindorle	1,567	0.73	New
Margin of victory		8,528	3.95	▲0.93
Turnout		218,127	70.19	▲0.26
Total valid votes		215,839		
Registered electors		310,755		▲12.49
BJP gain from INC		Swing	▲3.39	

=== Assembly Election 2009 ===
2009 Maharashtra Legislative Assembly election : Kolhapur South
Party	Candidate	Votes	%	±%
INC	Satej Dyandeo Patil	86,949	45.49	New
Independent	Dhananjay Mahadik	81,182	42.47	New
BJP	Suryakant Budihalkar Patil	10,008	5.24	New
Independent	Digvijay Bhausaheb Khanvilkar	7,868	4.12	New
Independent	Arvind Bhiva Mane	1,564	0.82	New
Margin of victory		5,767	3.02	
Turnout		191,174	69.20	
Total valid votes		191,159		
Registered electors		276,246		
INC win (new seat)				

== See also ==
- Kolhapur district
- List of constituencies of the Maharashtra Legislative Assembly
