= Dhananjay Mahadik =

Indian politician

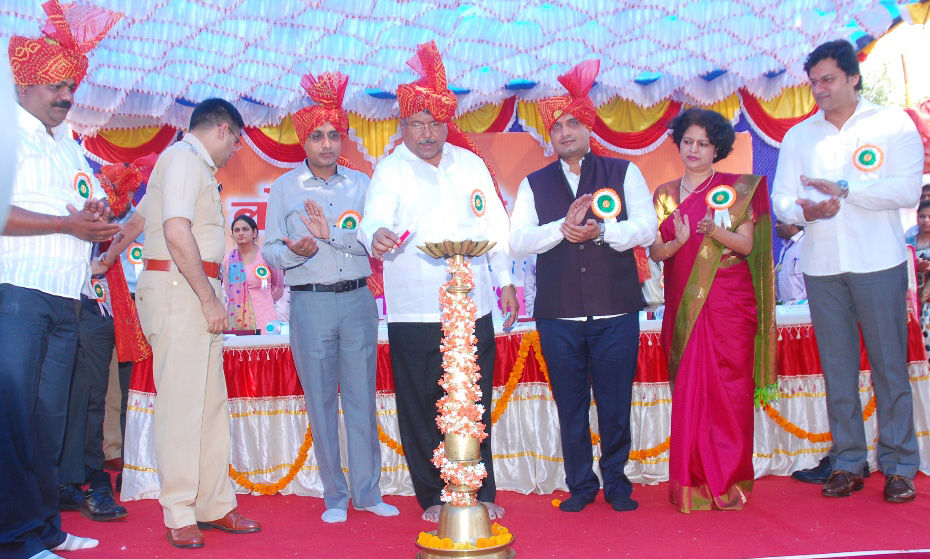
- Mahadik 3rd from the left

Member of Parliament, Rajya Sabha
- Incumbent
- Assumed office 1 July 2022
- Preceded by: Vinay Sahasrabuddhe
- Constituency: Maharashtra

Member of Parliament, Lok Sabha
- In office 2014–2019
- Preceded by: Sadashivrao Dadoba Mandlik
- Succeeded by: Sanjay Mandlik
- Constituency: Kolhapur

Personal details
- Born: 15 January 1972 (age 54) Kolhapur, Maharashtra
- Party: Bharatiya Janata Party (2019-Present)
- Other political affiliations: Nationalist Congress Party (Before 2019)
- Spouse: Arundhati Mahadik (m. 1994)
- Children: 3 sons
- Parent: Bhimrao (Dada) Mahadik (father)
- Relatives: Amal Mahadevrao Mahadik (cousin brother); Mahadevrao (Appa) Mahadik (uncle)
- Education: Bachelor of Commerce
- Alma mater: Shivaji University

Dhananjay Bhimrao Mahadik is an Indian politician from Kolhapur district in Maharashtra state. He is a Member of Parliament in the Rajya Sabha from Maharashtra as a candidate of the Bharatiya Janata Party. He was elected to the 16th Lok Sabha (2014–2019) from Kolhapur as an NCP candidate. Dhananjay Mahadik is a Nephew of Mahadevrao Mahadik alias Appa Mahadik.

== Political career ==
In 2004, Mahadik contested the Lok Sabha election as a candidate of Shiv Sena from Kolhapur against NCP's Sadashivrao Mandlik and lost. He parted ways with Shiv Sena and joined Nationalist Congress Party (NCP). But NCP did not consider him as the party's candidate for the 2009 Indian General Election. He unsuccessfully contested the election as an independent candidate.

He entered Lok Sabha as a member of NCP in 2014. On 10 January 2017, Mahadik, along with NCP MLA Hasan Mushrif, former NCP MP Nivedita Sambhajirao Mane, Kolhapur mayor Hasina Faras, and 400 others were arrested for blocking traffic on the Pune-Bengaluru National Highway as part of a protest against the effects of demonetization.

He received Sansad Ratna Award for his outstanding performance in 2017 and 2018.

After representing Kolhapur in Lok Sabha (2014–2019), he unsuccessfully contested from the same seat in 2019 elections. He lost 2019 Lok Sabha election against Shiv Sena leader Sanjay Mandalik.

In September 2019, he along with his NCP colleagues joined the BJP. In 2022, he became a Rajya Sabha Member from Maharashtra state.

Dhananjay Mahadik served as the chairman of Bhima Sahakari Sakhar Karkhana for almost a decade till 2022. In 2022 elections the Mahadik panel secured all board seats, and his son Vishwaraj Dhananjay Mahadik was elected as the new chairman of the factory.

== Personal life ==
Mahadik is the nephew of former-MLA Mahadeorao Mahadik. In 1994, Dhananjay Mahadik married Arundhati Mahadik. They have 3 sons namely Prithviraj, Vishwaraj and Krishnaraj; they all reside together in Kolhapur.

Krishnaraj Mahadik, the youngest of Dhananjay Mahadik's sons, currently leads BJYM Maharashtra. His YouTube channel has picked up over 700,000 subscribers. He also raced competitively for a while and managed to win the British F3 title.
