= Kagal =

- Town
- Location in Maharashtra, India Kagal (India)
- Coordinates: 16.58°N 74.32°E
- Country: India
- State: Maharashtra
- District: Kolhapur
- Elevation: 553 m (1,814 ft)

Population (2001)
  - Total: 23,775

Languages
  - Official: Marathi
- Time zone: UTC+5:30 (IST)
- PIN: 416216
- Telephone code: 02325

Kagal is a town in Kolhapur district of the Indian state of Maharashtra.

== History ==
During the rule of the Marathas and the British Raj, the town served as the seat of the noble Ghatge Maratha family, one of the most prominent families in the princely state of Kolhapur.

Sultan Mahmud Padshah, the Muslim ruler of Bijapur, rewarded in 1572 the Kagal dynasty founder Piraji Raje, the descendant of Kamraja Suryavanshi, the progenitor of Ghatge family known as Zunzar Rao (Valiant Fighter), with the title Sarjerao and the Kagal pargana, then consisting of 69 and a 1/2 villages, as a Jagir (vassal estate) within the princely state of Kolhapur (later a salute state). The name of his dynastic line came corrupted to Ghatge 'Jump ahead'.

During incessant 19th century warfare and depredations, some of the villages were lost, reducing their number to 41, covering 298 km2, as guaranteed by article 3 of the Treaty entered into by the Maharaja of Kolhapur with the British Government in 1826.

== Geography ==
Kagal is a taluka in Kolhapur district. It is located at the boundary of Maharashtra and Karnataka. The Chhatrapati Shahu Sahakari Sakar Karkhana is located here. The Dudhganga river passes through Kagal. Kagal is located at 16.58°N 74.32°E. It has an average elevation of 553 metres (1814 feet).

== Demographics ==
As of 2001 India census, Kagal had a population of 23,775. Males constitute 51% of the population and females 49%. Kagal has an average literacy rate of 71%, higher than the national average of 59.5%: male literacy is 78%, and female literacy is 64%. In Kagal, 12% of the population is under 6 years of age. Marathi is the predominant native language here, it is widely spoken.

== Notable people ==
- Vijayendra Ghatge, TV & Film actor & The Raja of Kagal Royal family
- Gopal Krishna Gokhale, did his primary education at Kagal.
- Shahu of Kolhapur, also known as Chhatrapati Shahu Maharaj.
- Hasan Mushrif, is a leader of the Nationalist Congress Party and a former minister in the government of Maharashtra. He is member of the Maharashtra Legislative Assembly from Kolhapur's Kagal Assembly seat.
- Anand Yadav, a Sahitya Academy Award winner was born in this city.

== The Kagal-Hatkanangale industrial area ==
The Kagal-Hatkanangale industrial area is situated 12 km from Kolhapur city and the airport.

The nearest railway station is at Kolhapur 13 km away from the industrial area. The industrial area is located 3 km from the National Highway 4 (Mumbai-Bangalore).

The Karnataka State boundary is just 3 km from this estate and Belagavi, a city just 70 km from the estate.

Nearest airport is Kolhapur (12 km) Ratnagiri port is 110 km and Panaji (Goa)and Dabolim airport 210 km. Two other major cities Pune and Mumbai are accessed via the National Highway and railways.

The other major industrial areas, Shiroli, Udyamnagar in Kolhapur and Gokul-shirgaon, are just 12 km, 15 km and 5 km from this area. 5-star MIDC is the main industry and other big companies are arriving.

== See also ==
- Belunki
