= Vinay Kore =

Indian politician (born 1971)

Vinay Vilasrao Kore

Member of Maharashtra Legislative Assembly
- Incumbent
- Assumed office (2009-2014), (2019-2024), (2024-Present)
- Preceded by: Satyajeet Patil Sarudkar
- Succeeded by: Satyajeet Patil Sarudkar
- Constituency: Shahuwadi
- In office (1999-2004), (2004 – 2009)
- Preceded by: Yeshwant Eknath Patil (DADA)
- Constituency: Panhala

Cabinet Minister, Government of Maharashtra
- In office 1 November 2004 – 1 December 2008
- Governor: Mohammed Fazal
- Chief Minister: Vilasrao Deshmukh
- Cabinet: Second Deshmukh ministry
- Ministry and Departments: Non-conventional Energy; Horticulture

Personal details
- Born: 10 April 1971 (age 55) kolhapur District, Maharashtra
- Party: Jan Surajya Shakti (2004-present)
- Other political affiliations: Nationalist Congress Party (1999-2004); Indian National Congress (before 1999)

Vinay Vilasrao Kore alias Savkar (born 1971) is an Indian politician from the state of Maharashtra. He is a three time member of the legislative assembly for Shahuwadi Assembly constituency of Shahuwadi, Kolhapur district, Maharashtra. He is a former state minister and the founder and president of the Jan Surajya Shakti party.

== Early life and education ==
Kore is from Sahuwadi, Kolhapur District, Maharashtra. He is the son of Vilasrao Vishwanath Kore. He passed Class 12 in 1990.

== Career ==
Kore won from Shahuwadi Assembly constituency representing Jan Surajya Shakti party in the 2019 Maharashtra Legislative Assembly elections. He polled votes and defeated his nearest rival, Satyajeet Babasaheb Patil of Shiv Sena by a margin of 27,863 votes. He was re-elected in 2024 supported by Maha Yuti by 36,053 votes, defeating SS(UBT) candidate.

Earlier in 1999, he won the Panhala Assembly constituency representing the Nationalist Congress Party. Later, he formed his own party, Jan Surajya Shakti, and won the Panhala seat again in 2004.

== Awards ==
- In 2023, he was awarded 'Lokmat Maharashtrian of the Year' in the business category.
