= Hasan Mushrif =

Indian politician

Cabinet Minister Government of Maharashtra
- Incumbent
- Assumed office 15 December 2024
- Minister: Medical Education
- Governor: C. P. Radhakrishnan; Acharya Devvrat additional charge
- Cabinet: Third Fadnavis ministry
- Chief Minister: Devendra Fadnavis
- Deputy CM: Eknath Shinde; Ajit Pawar (till his demise in 2026) Sunetra Pawar (from 2026)
- Guardian Minister: Washim
- Preceded by: Himself

Cabinet Minister Government of Maharashtra
- In office 14 July 2023 – 26 November 2024
- Minister: Medical Education; Special Assistance
- Governor: Ramesh Bais; C. P. Radhakrishnan
- Cabinet: Eknath Shinde ministry
- Chief Minister: Eknath Shinde
- Deputy CM: Devendra Fadnavis (First); Ajit Pawar (Second)
- Guardian Minister: Kolhapur district
- Preceded by: Girish Mahajan (Medical Education Ministry); Eknath Shinde CM (Special Assistance Ministry)
- Succeeded by: Himself

Cabinet Minister Government of Maharashtra
- In office 30 December 2019 – 29 June 2022
- Ministry and Departments: Rural Development
- Governor: Bhagat Singh Koshyari
- Chief Minister: Uddhav Thackeray
- Preceded by: Pankaja Munde
- Succeeded by: Girish Mahajan
- In office 5 April 2021 – 29 June 2022
- Ministry and Departments: Labour (Acting)
- Governor: Bhagat Singh Koshyari
- Chief Minister: Uddhav Thackeray
- Preceded by: Dilip Walse-Patil
- Succeeded by: Suresh Khade

Guardian minister of Ahmednagar District Government of Maharashtra
- In office 2020–2022
- Preceded by: Ram Shinde

Member of Maharashtra Legislative Assembly
- Incumbent
- Assumed office (1999-2004), (2004-2009), (2009-2014), (2014-2019), (2019-2024), (2024-Present)
- Preceded by: Sanjay Anandrao Ghatage
- Constituency: Kagal

Personal details
- Born: March 24, 1954 (age 72) Kagal, Kolhapur District
- Party: Nationalist Congress Party (1999-Present)
- Other political affiliations: Indian National Congress (Before 1999)
- Spouse: Sahira Mushrif
- Children: Sajid Mushrif, Navid Mushrif and grandson Sayhan Mushrif

Hasan Miyalal Mushrif is an Indian politician. He is leader of the Nationalist Congress Party and a cabinet minister in the Devendra Fadnavis Government of Maharashtra. He is a member of the Maharashtra Legislative Assembly from Kolhapur's Kagal assembly seat.

On 10 January 2017, Mushrif, along with NCP MP Dhananjay Mahadik, former NCP MP Nivedita Sambhajirao Mane, Kolhapur mayor Hasina Faras, and 400 others, were arrested for blocking traffic on the Pune-Bengaluru national highway as part of a protest against the effects of demonetisation.

== Political career ==
Mushrif has served as the Minister of Labour of the Government of Maharashtra.
