= Ministry of Public Health (Maharashtra) =

Government agency in Maharashtra, India

Ministry of Public Health and Family Welfare Government of Maharashtra
- मंत्रालय सार्वजनिक आरोग्य आणि कुटुंब कल्याण विभाग, महाराष्ट्र शासन
- Seal of the state of Maharashtra

- Building of Administrative Headquarters of Mumbai

Ministry overview
- Jurisdiction: (India) Maharashtra
- Headquarters: Mantralay, Mumbai
- Minister responsible: Prakashrao Abitkar, Cabinet Minister
- Deputy Minister responsible: Meghana Bordikar, Minister of State
- Parent department: Government of Maharashtra
- Website: arogya.maharashtra.gov.in/1035/Home

The Ministry of Public Health and Family Welfare is a ministry in the Government of Maharashtra. Ministry looks after health policy.

The Ministry is headed by a cabinet level Minister. Prakashrao Abitkar is current Minister of Public Health and Family Welfare.

== Head office ==
Minister of Public Health and Family Welfare मंत्री सार्वजनिक आरोग्य आणि कुटुंब कल्याण विभाग
- Emblem of India

- Flag of India
- Incumbent; Prakashrao Abitkar since 21 December 2024
- Ministry of Public Health and Family Welfare (Maharashtra)
- Style: The Honourable
- Abbreviation: Cabinet Minister
- Member of: State Cabinet
- Reports to: Chief Minister, Maharashtra Legislature
- Seat: Mantralaya, Mumbai
- Appointer: Governor on the advice of the Chief Minister
- Term length: 5 years
- Precursor: Devendra Fadnavis; (2019–2022)
- Inaugural holder: P. K. Sawant; (1960–1962)
- Formation: 1 May 1960
- Deputy: Meghana Bordikar

== Cabinet Ministers ==
No.	Portrait	Minister (Constituency)	Term of office			Political party	Ministry	Chief Minister
No.	Portrait	Minister (Constituency)	From	To	Period	Political party	Ministry	Chief Minister
Minister of Public Health
01		Homi J. H. Taleyarkhan (MLC for Elected by MLAs Constituency No. 22 - Mumbai Suburban District) (Legislative Council)	01 May 1960	07 March 1962	1 year, 310 days	Indian National Congress	Yashwantrao I	Yashwantrao Chavan
02		Parashuram Krishnaji Sawant (MLA for Chiplun Constituency No. 265- Ratnagiri District) (Legislative Assembly)	08 March 1962	19 November 1962	256 days	Indian National Congress	Yashwantrao II	Yashwantrao Chavan
03		Madhukar Dhanaji Chaudhari (MLA for Raver Constituency No. 11- Jalgaon District) (Legislative Assembly)	20 November 1962	24 November 1963	1 year, 4 days	Indian National Congress	Kannamwar l	Marotrao Kannamwar
04		Parashuram Krishnaji Sawant (MLA for Chiplun Constituency No. 265- Ratnagiri District) (Legislative Assembly) (Interim Chief Minister)	25 November 1962	04 December 1963	9 days	Indian National Congress	Sawant	Parashuram Krishnaji Sawant
05		Shantilal Shah (MLA for Vile Parle Constituency No. 177- Mumbai Suburban District (Legislative Assembly)	05 December 1963	01 March 1967	3 years, 86 days	Indian National Congress	Vasantrao I	Vasantrao Naik
06		Gopalrao Bajirao Khedkar (MLA for Akot Constituency No. 28- Akola District) (Legislative Assembly)	01 March 1967	27 October 1969	2 years, 240 days	Indian National Congress	Vasantrao II	Vasantrao Naik
07		Pratibha Patil (MLA for Jalgaon City Constituency No. 13- Jalgaon District) (Legislative Assembly)	27 October 1969	13 March 1972	2 years, 138 days	Indian National Congress	Vasantrao II	Vasantrao Naik
08		Rafique Zakaria (MLC for Elected by MLAs Constituency No. 16 - Mumbai Suburban District) (Legislative Council)	13 March 1972	04 April 1973	1 year, 32 days	Indian National Congress	Vasantrao III	Vasantrao Naik
09		Anant Namjoshi (MLA for Girgaon Constituency No. 185- Mumbai City District) (Legislative Assembly)	04 April 1973	17 Match; 1974	347 days	Indian National Congress	Vasantrao III	Vasantrao Naik
10		Abdul Rahman Antulay (MLA for Shrivardhan Constituency No. 193- Raigad District) (Legislative Assembly)	17 Match; 1974	21 February 1975	341 days	Indian National Congress	Vasantrao III	Vasantrao Naik
11		Pratibha Patil (MLA for Jalgaon City Constituency No. 13- Jalgaon District) (Legislative Assembly)	21 February 1975	16 April 1977	2 years, 54 days	Indian National Congress	Shankarrao I	Shankarrao Chavan
Minister of Public Health and Family Welfare
12		Govindrao Sarnayak (MLA for Balapur Constituency No. 29- Akola District) (Legislative Assembly)	17 April 1977	07 March 1978	1 year, 324 days	Indian National Congress	Vasantdada I	Vasantdada Patil
13		Shivajirao Patil Nilangekar (MLA for Nilanga Constituency No. 238- Latur District) (Legislative Assembly)	07 March 1978	18 July 1978	133 days	Indian National Congress (Indira)	Vasantdada II	Vasantdada Patil
14		Pramila Tople (MLA for Akola Constituency No. 15- Akola District (Legislative Assembly)	18 July 1978	19 November 1979	1 year, 124 days	Indian Congress (Socialist)	Pawar I	Sharad Pawar
15		Baliram Waman Hiray (MLA for Dabhadi Constituency No. 74- Nashik District) (Legislative Assembly)	09 June 1980	21 January 1982	1 year, 226 days	Indian National Congress	Antulay	Abdul Rahman Antulay
16		Baliram Waman Hiray (MLA for Dabhadi Constituency No. 74- Nashik District) (Legislative Assembly)	21 January 1982	02 February 1983	1 year, 12 days	Indian National Congress	Bhosale	Babasaheb Bhosale
17		Lalita Rao (MLA for Trombay Constituency No. 177- Mumbai Suburban District) (Legislative Assembly)	07 February 1983	05 March 1985	2 years, 26 days	Indian National Congress	Vasantdada III	Vasantdada Patil
18		Balachandra Bhai Sawant (MLC for Elected by MLAs Constituency No. 09 - Ratnagiri District) (Legislative Council)	12 March 1985	03 June 1985	83 days	Indian National Congress	Vasantdada IV	Vasantdada Patil
19		Balachandra Bhai Sawant (MLC for Elected by MLAs Constituency No. 09 - Ratnagiri District) (Legislative Council)	03 June 1985	12 March 1986	282 days	Indian National Congress	Nilangekar	Shivajirao Patil Nilangekar
20		Balachandra Bhai Sawant (MLC for Elected by MLAs Constituency No. 09 - Ratnagiri District) (Legislative Council)	12 March 1986	26 June 1988	2 years, 106 days	Indian National Congress	Shankarrao II	Shankarrao Chavan
21		Jawaharlal Darda (MLC for Elected by MLAs Constituency No. 19 - Yavatmal District) (Legislative Council)	26 June 1988	03 March 1990	1 year, 250 days	Indian National Congress	Pawar II	Sharad Pawar
22		Pushpatai Hirey (MLA for Dabhadi Constituency No. 74- Nashik District) (Legislative Assembly)	03 March 1990	25 June 1991	1 year, 114 days	Indian National Congress	Pawar III	Sharad Pawar
23		Pushpatai Hirey (MLA for Dabhadi Constituency No. 74- Nashik District) (Legislative Assembly)	25 June 1991	22 February 1993	1 year, 242 days	Indian National Congress	Sudhakarrao	Sudhakarrao Naik
24		Pushpatai Hirey (MLA for Dabhadi Constituency No. 74- Nashik District) (Legislative Assembly)	06 March 1993	18 November 1994	1 year, 257 days	Indian National Congress	Pawar IV	Sharad Pawar
25		Daulatrao Aher (MLC for Elected by MLAs Constituency No. 21 - Nashik District) (Legislative Council)	14 March 1995	01 February 1999	3 years, 324 days	Bharatiya Janata Party	Joshi	Manohar Joshi
26		Babanrao Gholap (MLA for Deolali Constituency No. 126- Pune District) (Legislative Assembly)	01 February 1999	11 May 1999	99 days	Shiv Sena	Rane	Narayan Rane
27		Daulatrao Aher (MLC for Elected by MLAs Constituency No. 21 - Nashik District) (Legislative Council)	11 May 1999	17 October 1999	159 days	Bharatiya Janata Party	Rane	Narayan Rane
28		Chhagan Bhujbal (MLC for Elected by MLAs Constituency No. 09 - Mumbai City District) (Legislative Council) (Deputy Chief Minister)	19 October 1999	27 October 1999	8 days	Nationalist Congress Party	Deshmukh I	Vilasrao Deshmukh
29		Digvijay Khanvilkar (MLA for Karvir Constituency No. 275- Kolhapur district) (Legislative Assembly)	27 October 1999	16 January 2003	3 years, 81 days	Nationalist Congress Party	Deshmukh I	Vilasrao Deshmukh
30		Ashok Chavan (MLA for Mudkhed Constituency No. 85- Nanded District) (Legislative Assembly)	18 January 2003	01 November 2004	1 year, 295 days	Indian National Congress	Sushilkumar	Sushilkumar Shinde
31		R. R. Patil (MLA for Tasgaon-Kavathe Mahankal Constituency No. 287- Sangli District) (Legislative Assembly) (Deputy Chief Minister)	01 November 2004	09 November 2004	8 days	Nationalist Congress Party	Deshmukh II	Vilasrao Deshmukh
32		Vimal Mundada (MLA for Kaij Constituency No. 232- Beed District) (Legislative Assembly)	09 November 2004	01 December 2008	4 years, 22 days	Nationalist Congress Party	Deshmukh II	Vilasrao Deshmukh
33		Rajendra Shingne (MLA for Sindkhed Raja Constituency No. 24- Buldhana District (Legislative Assembly)	08 December 2008	06 November 2009	333 days	Nationalist Congress Party	Ashok I	Ashok Chavan
34		Suresh Shetty (MLA for Andheri East Constituency No. 166- Mumbai Suburban district (Legislative Assembly)	07 November 2009	10 November 2010	1 year, 3 days	Indian National Congress	Ashok II	Ashok Chavan
35		Suresh Shetty (MLA for Andheri East Constituency No. 166- Mumbai Suburban district (Legislative Assembly)	11 November 2010	26 September 2014	3 years, 319 days	Indian National Congress	Prithviraj	Prithviraj Chavan
36		Pankaja Munde (MLA for Parli Constituency No. 233- Beed District) (Legislative Assembly)	31 October 2014	05 December 2014	35 days	Bharatiya Janata Party	Fadnavis I	Devendra Fadnavis
37		Deepak Sawant (MLC for Mumbai Graduate Constituency No. 02 - Mumbai City District) (Legislative Council)	05 December 2014	07 January 2019	4 years, 33 days	Shiv Sena	Fadnavis I	Devendra Fadnavis
38		Eknath Shinde (MLA for Kopri-Pachpakhadi Constituency No. 147- Thane District) (Legislative Assembly)	07 January 2019	12 November 2019	309 days	Shiv Sena	Fadnavis I	Devendra Fadnavis
39		Devendra Fadnavis (MLA for Nagpur South West Constituency No. 52- Nagpur District) (Legislative Assembly) (Chief_Minister); In Charge	23 November 2019	28 November 2019	5 days	Bharatiya Janata Party	Fadnavis II	Devendra Fadnavis
40		Jayant Patil (MLA for Islampur Constituency No. 283- Sangli District) (Legislative Assembly)	28 November 2019	30 December 2019	32 days	Nationalist Congress Party	Thackeray	Uddhav Thackeray
41		Rajesh Tope (MLA for Ghansawangi Constituency No. 100- Jalna District (Legislative Assembly)	30 December 2019	29 June 2022	2 years, 181 days	Nationalist Congress Party	Thackeray	Uddhav Thackeray
42		Eknath Shinde (MLA for Kopri-Pachpakhadi Constituency No. 147- Thane District) (Legislative Assembly) (Chief Minister); In Charge	30 June 2022	14 August 2022	45 days	Shiv Sena (2022–present)	Eknath	Eknath Shinde
43		Tanaji Sawant (MLA for Paranda Constituency No. 24- Dharashiv District Also Previously Known Osmanabad District (Legislative Assembly)	14 August 2022	26 November 2024	2 years, 135 days	Shiv Sena (2022–present)	Eknath	Eknath Shinde
44		Devendra Fadnavis (MLA for Nagpur South West Constituency No. 52- Nagpur District) (Legislative Assembly) (Chief_Minister); In Charge	05 December 2024	21 December 2024	16 days	Bharatiya Janata Party	Fadnavis III	Devendra Fadnavis
45		Prakashrao Abitkar (MLA for Radhanagari Constituency No. 272- Kolhapur District) (Legislative Assembly)	21 December 2024	Incumbent	1 year, 261 days	Shiv Sena (Shinde Group)	Fadnavis III	Devendra Fadnavis

== Ministers of State ==
No.	Portrait	Deputy Minister (Constituency)	Term of office			Political party	Ministry	Minister	Chief Minister
No.	Portrait	Deputy Minister (Constituency)	From	To	Period	Political party	Ministry	Minister	Chief Minister
Deputy Minister of Public Health and Family Welfare
Vacant			23 November 2019	28 November 2019	5 days	NA	Fadnavis II	Devendra Fadnavis	Devendra Fadnavis
01		Rajendra Patil Yadravkar (MLA for Shirol Constituency No. 280- Kolhapur District) (Legislative Assembly)	30 December 2019	27 June 2022	2 years, 179 days	Shiv Sena	Thackeray	Rajesh Tope	Uddhav Thackeray
02		Vishwajeet Kadam (MLA for Palus-Kadegaon Constituency No. 285- Sangli District) (Legislative Assembly); Additional_Charge	27 June 2022	29 June 2022	2 days	Indian National Congress	Thackeray	Rajesh Tope	Uddhav Thackeray
Vacant			30 June 2022	26 November 2024	2 years, 149 days	NA	Eknath	Eknath Shinde (2022 - 2022); Tanaji Sawant (2022 – 2024)	Eknath Shinde
03		Meghana Bordikar (MLA for Jintur Constituency No. 95- Parbhani District) (Legislative Assembly)	21 December 2024	incumbent	1 year, 261 days	Bharatiya Janata Party	Fadnavis III	Prakashrao Abitkar (2024 – Present)	Devendra Fadnavis

== Services ==
Ministry is responsible for providing free and affordable healthcare in Maharashtra.

=== Primary health services ===
Rural area in Maharashtra is covered by various health centers.

- 1,811 Primary Health Centres (PHC)
  1. One PHC for 30,000 populations in Non Tribal Area.
  2. One PHC for 20,000 populations in Tribal Area.
  3. One rural Hospital for every 4 to 5 Primary Health Centers.
- 10,580 Sub Centres
  1. One Sub Centre for 5,000 population in Non Tribal Area.
  2. One Sub Centre for 3,000 population in Tribal Area.
- 37 Ashramschool.

=== Secondary health services ===
Speciality services are provided at the district hospitals.

- ICU
- SNCU Ward (Special Newborn Care Unit)
- Burn Ward
- C.T. Scan
- Psychiatric ward
- Sonography Services
- Trauma Care unit

=== Tertiary health services ===
Super specialty services are offered in selected hospitals and medical colleges.

- Cardiology, Cardiovascular and cardiothoracic surgeries
- Nephrology & Urology
- Oncology and Chemotherapy Unit & Oncosurgeries
