= Ingoda =

Village in Maharashtra

- village
- Location in Maharashtra, India Ingoda (India)
- Coordinates: 18°25′15″N 75°24′19″E
- Country: India
- State: Maharashtra
- District: Osmanabad
- Tahsil: Paranda

Population (2011)
  - Total: 1,725

Languages
  - Official: Marathi
- Time zone: UTC+5:30 (IST)
- PIN: 413505
- Telephone code: 912477
- Vehicle registration: MH25
- Lok Sabha constituency: Osmanabad
- Vidhan Sabha constituency: Paranda

Ingoda is a village with a Gram panchayat in the Paranda Tehsil of Osmanabad district, Maharashtra state in India.

== Demographics ==
In the 2011 Indian census, Ingoda had population of 1725, with 906 (52.52%) males and 819 (47.47%) females, for a gender ratio of 904 females per thousand males.

== Transportation ==
Rail: The nearest railway station is Kurduvadi Junction on the Mumbai-Solapur route, 45 kilometers from Ingoda. Barshi, on the Kurduwadi-Latur route of the Central Railway, is another station near to Ingoda. The distance between Barshi and Ingoda is 47 kilometers.

Road: Ingoda, Paranda, Barshi, Kurduvadi, and Karmala are connected by state highways. The Maharashtra State Transport bus services are available to Ingoda from Barshi, Kurduwadi, Osmanabad, Bhoom, Karmala, Kharda, Pune and Pimpri-Chinchwad.

Air: Solapur, which is located 123 kilometers from Ingoda, is the nearest airport.

== See also ==
- Paranda (Vidhan Sabha constituency)
- Paranda
- Sina Kolegaon Dam
