= Paranda (disambiguation) =

Paranda is a town in the Indian state of Maharashtra.

Paranda may also refer to:

- Paranda Tahsil, tehsil in Maharashtra, India
- Paranda Fort, a fort in Maharashtra, India
- Punjabi paranda, a hair accessory worn by women in Punjab, India
- Paranda (music), a genre of Garifuna rhythmic music

== See also ==
- Parandi (disambiguation)
- Parinda, a 1989 Indian film by Vidhu Vinod Chopra
