= Parandi =

Parandi may refer to:

- Paranda (hair ornament), worn by women in Punjab, India
- Michel K. Parandi, film director

== See also ==
- Paranda (disambiguation)
