= Bori, Parbhani =

Village in Maharashtra

Bori
- Village
- Location in Maharashtra, India Bori (India)
- Coordinates: 19.4529701°N 76.751899°E
- Country: India
- State: Maharashtra
- District: Parbhani
- Founder: Kisannadu Anchintam ( Yerralu Dynasty)

Government
  - Type: Gram panchayat

Population (2011)
  - Total: 13,438
- Demonym: Borikar

Language
  - Official: Marathi
- Time zone: UTC+5:30 (IST)
- PIN: 431508
- Telephone code: 02457
- Vehicle registration: MH-22

Bori is a village in Jintur taluka of Parbhani district in Maharashtra state of India.

== Demography ==
Bori has total 2534 families residing. The Bori village has population of 13,438 of which 6,919 are males while 6,519 are females as per Population Census 2011. It is the largest gram panchayat of Parbhani district with 17 members.

Average Sex Ratio of Bori village is 942 which is higher than Maharashtra state average of 929.

Bori village has lower literacy rate compared to Maharashtra. In 2011, literacy rate of Bori village was 74.93% compared to 82.34% of Maharashtra. In Bori Male literacy stands at 83.35% while female literacy rate was 66.17%.

Schedule Caste (SC) constitutes 15.25% while Schedule Tribe (ST) were 0.83% of total population in Bori village.

== Transport ==
Bori is located 28 kilometres (17 mi) towards north from district headquarters Parbhani, and 14 kilometres (8.7 mi) towards south from Jintur. It is 479 kilometres (298 mi) from state capital Mumbai.

Bori is surrounded by Manwat taluka 44 kilometres (27 mi) towards west, Parbhani taluka towards south, Sailu taluka 20 kilometres (12 mi) towards west, Aundha Nagnath taluka towards east. It is on state highway and has easy connectivity to Parbhani, and Jintur.

Nearest railway stations to Bori include Parbhani 29 kilometres (18 mi), and sailu 20 kilometres (12 mi)

== Governance ==
Bori comes under Parbhani (Lok Sabha constituency) for Indian general elections and current member of Parliament representing this constituency is Sanjay Haribhau Jadhav of Uddhav Shiv Sena.

Bori comes under Jintur (Vidhan Sabha constituency) for assembly elections of Maharashtra. Current representative from this constituency in Maharashtra state assembly is Meghana Bordikar of Bhartiy Janta Party.

As per constitution of India and Panchyati Raaj Act, Bori village is administrated by Sarpanch (Head of Village) who is elected representative of a village. The current representative from this constituency is Mrs. Nirmalabai Shivajiroa Chaudhari of Nationalist Congress Party.

== Education ==
=== Colleges ===
- Dnyanopasak College of Arts, Commerce, Science, and Technology
- Shakuntalabai Bordikar Junior College
- Basaveshwar Junior College
- Saikrupa Junior College

=== Schools ===
- Z.P. High School
- Z.P. Kanya School
- Dyanopasak Vidyalay, Bori
- Shakuntala Bordikar Vidyalaya
- Saikrupa English School
- Saikrupa Primary and Secondary School
- New Era English School
- Turabul Haq Urdu H S Bori

== See also ==
- Zari
- Jintur
