= Zari (disambiguation) =

Zari is a thread made of fine gold or silver.

Zari may refer to:

== Places ==
- Zari District, a district in Balkh Province, Afghanistan
- Zari, Palghar, a village in Maharashtra India
- Zari, Parbhani, a village in Maharashtra, India
- Zari, Tibet, a village in Tibet
- Zari, Iran, a village in Iran

== People ==
- Israel Zari (born 1990), an Israeli politician
- Zari Hassan (born 1978), a Ugandan performing artist and businesswoman

== Music ==
- "Zari" (song), a 2024 song by Marina Satti, the Greek entry for the Eurovision Song Contest 2024

== Television ==
- Zari Tarazi, a character in the TV series Legends of Tomorrow
- Zari Tomaz, a character in the TV series Legends of Tomorrow
- "Zari" (Legends of Tomorrow episode)
- "Zari, Not Zari" (Legends of Tomorrow episode)

== Other uses ==
- Zari language, a Chadic language of Nigeria
