= Gadadgavhan =

Village in Maharashtra

Gadadgavhan is a small village located in Jintur of Parbhani district, Maharashtra.

== Demographics ==
There are a total of 395 families residing in Gadadgavhan. As of the 2011 Census, the village has population of 2108, of which 1059 are males and 1049 are females.

In Gadadgavhan village, the population of children aged 0-6 is 301, which makes up 14.28% of the total population. Average sex ratio of Gadadgavhan is 991, which is higher than Maharashtra's average of 929. The child sex ratio for the Gadadgavhan as of the 2011 census is 955, higher than Maharashtra's average of 894. Gadadgavhan village has low literacy rate compared to Maharashtra. In 2011, the literacy rate of Gadadgavhan village was 74.21%, compared to 82.34% of Maharashtra. In Gadadgavhan, male literacy stands at 84.09% while female literacy rate is 64.30%. As per the Constitution of India and the Panchyati Raaj Act, Gadadgavhan village is administered by a sarpanch, who is the elected representative of village.
