= Prakashrao Abitkar =

Indian politician

Prakash Abitkar

Cabinet Minister Government of Maharashtra
- Incumbent
- Assumed office 15 December 2024
- Minister: Public Health & Family Welfare
- Governor: C. P. Radhakrishnan; Acharya Devvrat additional charge
- Cabinet: Third Fadnavis ministry
- Chief Minister: Devendra Fadnavis
- Deputy CM: Eknath Shinde; Ajit Pawar (till his demise in 2026) Sunetra Pawar (from 2026)
- Guardian Minister: Kolhapur district
- Preceded by: Tanaji Sawant

Member of the Maharashtra Legislative Assembly
- Incumbent
- Assumed office 2014
- Preceded by: Krishnarao Patil alias K.P Patil
- Constituency: Radhanagari

Personal details
- Party: Shiv Sena
- Education: Shivaji University, Kolhapur

Prakash Abitkar is a Shiv Sena politician from Kolhapur district, Maharashtra. He has been serving as the Member of the Legislative Assembly for the Radhanagari Vidhan Sabha constituency of Kolhapur, Maharashtra, India since 2014.

== Early life ==
Prakash Abitkar was born on June 30, 1974 in Gargoti Bhudargad area of Kolhapur, Maharashtra. He was a laborer's son who rose through grass root politics. He completed his education from Shivaji University Kolhapur earning a BA honors degree in 1995.

== Political Career ==
Abitkar began his political career at a very young age when he was elected as an independent member of Gargoti Panchayat Samiti (Bhudargad) and served as its Deputy Chairperson (Upasabhapati) around 1997. From 2002 to 2007 he served as a member of the Kolhapur Zilla Parishad and its Standing Committee.

He joined Shiv Sena and contested the 2014 Maharashtra Legislative Assembly elections from Radhanagari constituency. He defeated the incumbent Krishnarao Patil with a massive margin of over 40,000 votes marking a strong debut.

In 2019 he was successfully reelected for a second term and then in 2024 achieved a historic hattrick by winning the Radhanagari seat for the third time becoming the first ever MLA from Radhanagari to do so.

In December 2024 following the formation of the government, he was appointed as Cabinet Minister for Public Health and Family Welfare in the Maharashtra government. This marked the first time the Radhanagari constituency received a cabinet minister position. He also serves as the Guardian Minister ( Palak Mantri ) for Kolhapur district.

== Positions held ==
- 2014: Elected to Maharashtra Legislative Assembly
- 2019: Elected to Maharashtra Legislative Assembly for second term
- 2024: Elected to Maharashtra Legislative Assembly for the third time
- 2024: Appointed as the Cabinet Minister for Public Health and Family Welfare
- 2025: Appointed as the Guardian Minister for Kolhapur District
