= Charthana =

Village in Maharashtra

- Village
- Location in Maharashtra, India Charthana (India)
- Coordinates: 19°37′36″N 76°32′23″E
- Country: India
- State: Maharashtra
- District: Parbhani
- Founder: Kisannadu Anchintam ( Yerralu Dynasty)

Government
  - Type: Gram panchayat

Population (2011)
  - Total: 7,795
- Demonym: Charthanakar

Languages
  - Official: Marathi
- Time zone: UTC+5:30 (IST)
- PIN: 431509
- Telephone code: 02457
- Vehicle registration: MH-22

Charthana is a major village in Jintur taluka of Parbhani district in Maharashtra state of India. It used to be known as Charukshetra Nagari in the name of king Charudatta. There are near about 360 temples of Mahadeva, some of which are under the ground. The Archaeological Survey of India (ASI) has acquired the remaining temples for conservation. Gokuleshwar mandir, Barav, Dwipmal, and Nartirtha are places of interest among many others.

== Demography ==
Charthana is a village with total 4120 families residing. Charthana village has population of 17000 of which 9000are males while 8000 are females as per Population Census 2011.

Average Sex Ratio of Charthana village is 970 which is higher than Maharashtra state average of 929.

Charthana village has lower literacy rate compared to Maharashtra. In 2011, literacy rate of Charthana village was 75.45% compared to 82.34% of Maharashtra. In Charthana Male literacy stands at 82.07% while female literacy rate was 68.81%.

Other backword class (OBC), Schedule Caste (SC) constitutes 7.75% while Schedule Tribe (ST) were 1.04% of total population in Charthana village.

== Transport ==
Charthana is located on Jintur-Mantha state highway 55 km (34 mi) towards north from district headquarters Parbhani. 18 km (11 mi) from Jintur. 459 km (285 mi) from State capital Mumbai.

Among major towns, Mantha is 18 km (11 mi) away, Sailu is 25 km (16 mi) and Manwath is 33 km (21 mi).

== Government and politics ==
Charthana is part of Parbhani (Lok Sabha constituency) for Indian general elections and current member of Parliament representing this constituency is Sanjay Haribhau Jadhav of Shiv Sena.

Charthana is part of Jintur (Vidhan Sabha constituency) for assembly elections of Maharashtra. Current representative from this constituency in Maharashtra state assembly is meghna sakore bordikar of bhartiya janta party. Current representative of this charthana circle (Zilla Parishad parbhani) (mrs.minatai nanasaheb raut), they are elected from last 15 years / 3 terms of hatrik.

=== Schools in Charthana ===
Late Jogwadkar Hs Ashram

Address : charthana, jintur, parbhani, Maharashtra . PIN- 431509, Post - Jintur

Turabul Haque Urdu High School

Address : Charthana, Tal. Jintur, Parbhani, Maharashtra . PIN- 431509, Post - Jintur

Sant Janardhan Vidyalaya

Address : charthana, jintur, parbhani, Maharashtra . PIN- 431509, Post - Jintur

Zilla Parishad High School

Address : charthana, jintur, parbhani, Maharashtra . PIN- 431509, Post - Jintur

Ashram School Charthana

Address : charthana, jintur, parbhani, Maharashtra . PIN- 431509, Post - Jintur
