= Dnyaneshwar Patil =

Indian politician (died 2024)

The Honorable Dnyaneshwar Patil

Member of Legislative Assembly of Maharashtra
- In office 1995–1999
- Constituency: Paranda

Member of Legislative Assembly of Maharashtra
- In office 1999–2004
- Constituency: Paranda

Personal details
- Died: 2 October 2024
- Party: Shiv Sena
- Occupation: Politician

Dnyaneshwar Raosaheb Patil (died 2 October 2024) was a Shiv Sena politician from Osmanabad district. He was Member of the Legislative Assembly from Paranda (Vidhan Sabha constituency) of Osmanabad District, Maharashtra, India as a member of Shiv Sena. He has been elected consecutively for two terms in the Maharashtra Legislative Assembly for 1995 and 1999.

Patil died on 2 October 2024.

== Positions held ==
- 1995: Elected to Maharashtra Legislative Assembly
- 1999: Re-Elected to Maharashtra Legislative Assembly
- 2010: Elected as Director of Osmanabad district central cooperative Bank
- 2015: Re-Elected as Director of Osmanabad district central cooperative Bank

== See also ==
- Sina Kolegaon Dam
- Paranda Fort
- Bhoom
- Washi
