= Tanaji Sawant =

Indian politician

Cabinet Minister Government of Maharashtra
- In office 14 August 2022 – 26 November 2024
- Minister: Public Health and Family Welfare
- Governor: Bhagat Singh Koshyari; Ramesh Bais; C. P. Radhakrishnan
- Chief Minister: Eknath Shinde
- Deputy CM: Devendra Fadnavis; Ajit Pawar
- Guardian Minister: Osmanabad District
- Preceded by: Rajesh Tope (Public Health and Family Welfare Ministry); Shankarrao Gadakh (Osmanabad District); Dhananjay Munde Additional Charge (Parbhani District)
- Succeeded by: Prakashrao Abitkar

Cabinet Minister Government of Maharashtra
- In office 06 June 2019 – 08 November 2019
- Minister: Soil and Water Conservation
- Governor: Bhagat Singh Koshyari
- Chief Minister: Devendra Fadnavis
- Guardian Minister: Osmanabad District
- Preceded by: Subhash Sureshchandra Deshmukh (Soil and Water Conservation Ministry); Deepak Sawant (Osmanabad District)
- Succeeded by: Eknath Shinde (Soil and Water Conservation Ministry): Shankarrao Gadakh (Osmanabad District)

Member of the Maharashtra Legislative Assembly
- Incumbent
- Assumed office October 2019
- Constituency: Paranda

Member of the Maharashtra Legislative Council
- In office December 2016 – October 2019
- Preceded by: Sandeep Bajoriya
- Succeeded by: Dushyant Chaturvedi
- Constituency: Yavatmal Local Authorities

Personal details
- Party: Shiv Sena
- Other political affiliations: Balasahebanchi Shiv Sena (2022-2023)

Tanaji Jaywant Sawant is a businessman, politician representing from the Shiv Sena and deputy leader from Solapur district, Maharashtra. He is current Member of Legislative Assembly from Bhoom / Paranda / Washi Vidhan Sabha constituency as a member of Shiv Sena. He was elected to legislative council with a record margin of 270 votes, securing 348 votes.

He came into prominence for his Water conservation project, part of Shiv Sena’s ‘Shiv Jal Kranti’ scheme in Dharashiv district in May 2016. He was accused by Rohit Pawar of NCP-SP to have been involved in a Rs 6500 Crore scam during his tenure as health minister and called for his resignation.

== Positions held ==
- 2016: Deputy Leader, Shiv Sena
- 2016: Elected to Maharashtra Legislative Council
- 2017: Appointed Shiv Sena Sampark Pramukh Osmanabad and Solapur District
- 2019: Minister of Water Conservation in Maharashtra State Government
- 2019: Elected to Maharashtra Legislative Assembly
- 2022: Took oath as Cabinet Minister.
