= Chandradip Narke =

Indian politician

Chandradeep Narake

Member of Legislative Assembly of the Maharashtra
- Incumbent
- Assumed office 23 November 2024
- Preceded by: P. N. Patil
- Constituency: Karvir
- In office 2009–2019
- Preceded by: Satej Patil
- Succeeded by: P. N. Patil

Personal details
- Born: 20 October 1967 (age 58)
- Party: Shiv Sena (2022-present)
- Education: B E
- Website: chandradeepnarake.com

Chandradeep Shashikant Narake is a Shiv Sena politician from Kolhapur district, Maharashtra. He is Member of Legislative Assembly from Karvir Vidhan Sabha constituency of Kolhapur, Maharashtra, India from the Shiv Sena. He has been elected for 2 consecutive terms in the Maharashtra Legislative Assembly for 2009, and 2014. He was defeated in 2019 but won the seat again in 2024.

== Positions held ==
- 2009: Elected to Maharashtra Legislative Assembly (1st term)
- 2014: Re-Elected to Maharashtra Legislative Assembly (2nd term)
- 2024: Re-Elected to Maharashtra Legislative Assembly (3rd term)
