= Nemgiri =

Religion
- Affiliation: Jainism
- Deity: Parshvanatha
- Festival: Mahavir Jayanti

Location
- Location: Jintur, Parbhani district, Maharashtra
- Interactive map of Nemgiri
- Coordinates: 19°36′31.3″N 76°41′04.7″E

Architecture
- Creator: Rashtrakuta dynasty
- Established: 8th-9th Century
- Temple: 2

Website
- http://www.nemgiri.org/

Nemgiri is a place in Jintur taluka of Parbhani district of Maharashtra state of India. Nemgiri is particularly known for its Jain temple which is protected by state government and Archaeological Survey of India.

== History ==
Nemgiri is named after twenty-second Jain tirthankara Neminatha. In Marathi language or originally in Sanskrit, Nemi is for Neminatha while giri means mountain. There is no specific historical knowledge about this particular fort with the name Nemgiri, which Rashtrakuta kings have ruled in Jintur. However, there is some historical knowledge available about the caves. In ancient times this area was known as Jainpur, in 9th century during the time of Emperor Amoghavarsha of Rashtrakut Family. Later, in the middle period of Indian History, this was destroyed by invaders, and its name changed to Jintur, which is its current name.

At that time, 300 Jain families and 14 Jain Temples were present. Out of them, only two temples currently remain.

== Temple ==
The holy site is situated in sub hills of Sahyadri Mountains, in the area of Parbhani district 3 kilometres (1.9 mi) away from Jintur. Two hills, named Nemgiri and Chandragiri, are known for their ancient, artistic, and miraculous Jain Cave Temples and Chaityalayas.

There are two temples and seven caves on the two hills. The hills are named as Nemgiri and chandragiri respectively.

On Nemgiri hill there are seven caves. The caves have tiny entrances but the idols inside are quiet large. Nemgiri caves are unique examples of engineering of that era.

== See also ==
- Jainism in Maharashtra
