= Sandeep Bajoriya =

Indian politician from Maharashtra

Member of the Maharashtra Legislative Council
- In office 6 December 2010 – 5 December 2016
- Preceded by: N. P. Hirani
- Succeeded by: Tanaji Sawant
- Constituency: Yavatmal

Personal details
- Born: 1973 (age 52–53) Yavatmal, Maharashtra, India
- Party: Nationalist Congress Party
- Children: 2
- Parent: Rameshchandra Madanlal Bajoriya (father)
- Education: Amolakchand Mahavidyalaya, Yavatmal
- Occupation: Businessman & Politician

Sandeep Rameshchandra Bajoriya (born 1973), also spelled Sandeep Bajoria, is an Indian politician from Yavatmal in the state of Maharashtra. A member of the Nationalist Congress Party (NCP), he represented Yavatmal in the Maharashtra Legislative Council from 2010 to 2016.

== Early life ==
Bajoriya was born in 1973 in Yavatmal, Maharashtra, to Rameshchandra Madanlal Bajoriya. He studied commerce at Amolakchand Mahavidyalaya in Yavatmal. In his election affidavits he has described his occupation as business and farming.

== Political career ==
Bajoriya was elected to the Maharashtra Legislative Council from Yavatmal on a Nationalist Congress Party ticket at the biennial election held in November 2010, one of two seats the party won at that round. He served a six-year term, from 6 December 2010 to 5 December 2016, and was the sitting Nationalist Congress Party member for the seat until the biennial election of November 2016.

In November 2017 Bajoriya was among the Nationalist Congress Party figures present at a press conference in Yavatmal, addressed by Supriya Sule, ahead of the party's Hallabol padyatra. The march, an agitation against the Fadnavis government, was launched from Yavatmal on 1 December 2017.

Following the split in the NCP in 2023, Bajoriya remained with the Sharad Pawar-led faction of the NCP. He had resigned from the party by November 2025.
