= P. N. Patil =

Leader of Indian National Congress (1953–2024)

P. N. Patil-Sadolikar

Member of Maharashtra Legislative Assembly
- In office 27 Oct 2019 – 23 May 2024
- Preceded by: Chandradip Narke
- Succeeded by: Chandradip Narke
- Constituency: Karvir
- In office 2004–2009
- Succeeded by: Abolished
- Constituency: Sangrul

Personal details
- Born: 6 January 1953 Sadoli Khalsa, Kolhapur district, Bombay State, India
- Died: 23 May 2024 (aged 71) Kolhapur, Maharashtra, India
- Party: Indian National Congress
- Occupation: Politician

P. N. Patil-Sadolikar (6 January 1953 – 23 May 2024) was an Indian politician who was a leader of the Indian National Congress and a member of the Maharashtra Legislative Assembly elected from Karvir Assembly constituency in Kolhapur city. In 2004 he was also elected from old Sangrul Assembly constituency in Kolhapur.

== Political career ==
P. N. Patil was active in district politics for the past 40 years. He was the President of Kolhapur District Congress for 20 years from 1999 to 2019. He also held position of Vice President of Maharashtra Pradesh Congress Committee.

At the age of 25 years he became Kolhapur District Congress general secretary and was Kolhapur District Congress general secretary from 1978 to 1985. In 1995, he contested for the first time in assembly election from Sangrul Assembly Constituency in Kolhapur.

Patil made significant contributions, notably as the founder of Rajivji Sahakari Soot Girni and Shripatrao Sahakari Bank. He also played roles as chairman for 5 years and director in the Kolhapur District Central Cooperative Bank for more than 35 years. He was also former chairman of Bhogavati Sugar Factory.

== Positions held ==
- 2004:Elected to Maharashtra Legislative Assembly.
- 2019: Elected to Maharashtra Legislative Assembly.

== Personal life and death ==
Patil died from a fall on 23 May 2024, at the age of 71.
