= Radhanagari Assembly constituency =

Constituency of the Maharashtra legislative assembly in India

Coordinates: 16.41°N 74.00°E

Radhanagari
- Constituency No. 272 for the Maharashtra Legislative Assembly

Constituency details
- Country: India
- Region: Western India
- State: Maharashtra
- District: Kolhapur
- Lok Sabha constituency: Kolhapur
- Established: 1952
- Total electors: 345,530
- Reservation: None

Member of Legislative Assembly
- 15th Maharashtra Legislative Assembly
- Incumbent Prakashrao Abitkar
- Party: SHS
- Alliance: NDA
- Elected year: 2024

Radhanagari Assembly constituency is one of the 288 Vidhan Sabha (legislative assembly) constituencies of Maharashtra state in western India.

== Overview ==
Radhanagari (constituency number 272) is one of the ten Vidhan Sabha constituencies located in the Kolhapur district. This constituency covers the entire Radhanagari tehsil and parts of Ajra and Bhudargad tehsils of this district.

Radhanagari is part of the Kolhapur Lok Sabha constituency along with five other Vidhan Sabha segments in this district, namely Chandgad, Kagal, Kolhapur South, Karvir and Kolhapur North.

== Members of the Legislative Assembly ==
Election	Member	Party
1952	Dnyandev Santaram Khandekar	Peasants and Workers Party of India
1957	Dnyandev Santaram Khandekar	Peasants and Workers Party of India
1962	Dnyandev Santaram Khandekar	Indian National Congress
1967	G. T. Kalikate	Peasants and Workers Party of India
1972	Krishnaji Gangaram More	Independent politician
1978	Dinkerrao Bhausaheb Jadhav	Indian National Congress
1980	Haribhau Ramchandra Kadav	Indian National Congress (I)
1985	Bajarang Anandrao Desai	Indian Congress (Socialist)
1990	Shankar Dhondi Patil	Janata Dal
1995	Namdevrao Shankar Bhoite	Independent politician
1999	Bajarang Anandrao Desai	Indian National Congress
2004	Krishnarao Parasharam Patil alias K.P. Patil	Independent politician
2009	Krishnarao Parasharam Patil alias K.P. Patil	Nationalist Congress Party
2014	Prakashrao Abitkar	Shiv Sena
2019	Prakashrao Abitkar	Shiv Sena
2024	Prakashrao Abitkar	Shiv Sena

== Election results ==
=== Assembly Election 2024 ===
2024 Maharashtra Legislative Assembly election : Radhanagari
Party	Candidate	Votes	%	±%
SS	Abitkar Prakash Anandrao	144,359	53.06%	▲9.91
SS(UBT)	Krishnarao Patil	106,100	39.00%	New
Independent	Anandrao Yashwant Alias A. Y. Patil	19,117	7.03%	New
NOTA	None of the above	996	0.37%	▼0.30
Margin of victory		38,259	14.06%	▲6.55
Turnout		273,061	79.03%	▲3.37
Total valid votes		272,065		
Registered electors		345,530		▲5.75
SS hold		Swing	▲9.91	

=== Assembly Election 2019 ===
2019 Maharashtra Legislative Assembly election : Radhanagari
Party	Candidate	Votes	%	±%
SS	Abitkar Prakash Anandrao	105,881	43.15%	▼13.10
NCP	Krishnarao Patil	87,451	35.64%	▼3.88
Independent	Arun Ganpatrao Dongale	15,414	6.28%	New
Independent	Rahul Bajarang Desai	12,895	5.26%	New
Independent	Chandrakantdada Baburao Patil	8,093	3.30%	New
VBA	Jivandada Pandurang Patil	7,832	3.19%	New
Independent	Satyajit Dinkarrao Jadhav	5,952	2.43%	New
NOTA	None of the above	1,656	0.67%	▲0.10
Margin of victory		18,430	7.51%	▼9.22
Turnout		247,214	75.66%	▼1.23
Total valid votes		245,378		
Registered electors		326,756		▲5.98
SS hold		Swing	▼13.10	

=== Assembly Election 2014 ===
2014 Maharashtra Legislative Assembly election : Radhanagari
Party	Candidate	Votes	%	±%
SS	Abitkar Prakash Anandrao	132,485	56.25%	New
NCP	Krishnarao Patil	93,077	39.52%	▼1.27
SWP	Patil Jalandar Ganapati	5,942	2.52%	▼9.13
NOTA	None of the above	1,343	0.57%	New
Margin of victory		39,408	16.73%	▼2.87
Turnout		237,051	76.89%	▲0.98
Total valid votes		235,514		
Registered electors		308,307		▲9.83
SS gain from NCP		Swing	▲15.46	

=== Assembly Election 2009 ===
2009 Maharashtra Legislative Assembly election : Radhanagari
Party	Candidate	Votes	%	±%
NCP	Krishnarao Patil	86,843	40.79%	New
Independent	Bajarang Anandrao Desai	45,121	21.19%	New
Independent	Prakashrao Abitkar	36,359	17.08%	New
SWP	Prof. Dr. Jalandar Ganapati Patil	24,802	11.65%	New
Independent	More Vijaysinh Krishnaji	15,597	7.33%	New
BSP	Taral Bhimrao Dattatray	2,558	1.20%	▲0.05
Independent	Patil Ananda Bhagoji	1,613	0.76%	New
Margin of victory		41,722	19.60%	▼15.70
Turnout		213,091	75.91%	▼3.02
Total valid votes		212,893		
Registered electors		280,707		▲41.29
NCP gain from Independent		Swing	▼19.95	

=== Assembly Election 2004 ===
2004 Maharashtra Legislative Assembly election : Radhanagari
Party	Candidate	Votes	%	±%
Independent	Krishnarao Patil	95,235	60.74%	New
INC	Bajarang Anandrao Desai	39,895	25.45%	▼20.52
SS	Sudhakar Maruti Salokhe	9,136	5.83%	▼2.75
BSP	Kambale Manu Santu	1,797	1.15%	New
Independent	Bhai P. T. Chougale	1,489	0.95%	New
Independent	Vitthal Nagoji Yelkar	1,365	0.87%	New
Independent	Prakash Prabhakar Sathe	1,147	0.73%	New
Margin of victory		55,340	35.30%	▲29.43
Turnout		156,815	78.93%	▲4.32
Total valid votes		156,786		
Registered electors		198,668		▲9.96
Independent gain from INC		Swing	▲14.77	

=== Assembly Election 1999 ===
1999 Maharashtra Legislative Assembly election : Radhanagari
Party	Candidate	Votes	%	±%
INC	Desai Bajarang Anandrao	59,938	45.97%	▲35.49
NCP	Krishnarao Patil	52,283	40.10%	New
SS	Sawant Pravin Vitthalrao	11,187	8.58%	▲4.73
Independent	Khorate Vitthalrao Shivajirao	6,340	4.86%	New
Margin of victory		7,655	5.87%	▲3.65
Turnout		134,792	74.61%	▼5.26
Total valid votes		130,388		
Registered electors		180,674		▲4.19
INC gain from Independent		Swing	▲14.25	

=== Assembly Election 1995 ===
1995 Maharashtra Legislative Assembly election : Radhanagari
Party	Candidate	Votes	%	±%
Independent	Bhoite Namdevrao Shankar	43,173	31.72%	New
Independent	Desai Bajarang Anandrao	40,158	29.51%	New
JD	Patil Shankarrao Dhondi	31,056	22.82%	▼27.93
INC	Patil Udaysinh Balaso	14,258	10.48%	▼33.62
SS	Sawant Raju Shivram	5,240	3.85%	▲1.35
Independent	Chougale Dadu Dattatraya	1,917	1.41%	New
Margin of victory		3,015	2.22%	▼4.44
Turnout		138,490	79.87%	▲4.34
Total valid votes		136,089		
Registered electors		173,400		▲11.77
Independent gain from JD		Swing	▼19.03	

=== Assembly Election 1990 ===
1990 Maharashtra Legislative Assembly election : Radhanagari
Party	Candidate	Votes	%	±%
JD	Patil Shankar Dhondi	58,803	50.75%	New
INC	Jadhav Dinkerrao Bhauso	51,090	44.10%	▲29.04
Independent	Chaugale Shripatrao Yashwant ( Awalikar)	3,077	2.66%	New
SS	Metal Shankarrao Narayan	2,892	2.50%	New
Margin of victory		7,713	6.66%	▲2.29
Turnout		117,188	75.53%	▲3.41
Total valid votes		115,862		
Registered electors		155,144		▲20.92
JD gain from IC(S)		Swing	▲10.09	

=== Assembly Election 1985 ===
1985 Maharashtra Legislative Assembly election : Radhanagari
Party	Candidate	Votes	%	±%
IC(S)	Desai Bajarang Anandrao	37,002	40.66%	New
Independent	Krishnarao Patil	33,026	36.29%	New
INC	Kadav Sarojani Haribhau	13,706	15.06%	New
CPI	Pansare Govind Pandharinath	4,023	4.42%	New
Independent	Kamble Vitthal Nana	1,907	2.10%	New
Independent	Patil Ajit Rajaram	980	1.08%	New
Margin of victory		3,976	4.37%	▼9.17
Turnout		92,528	72.12%	▼2.73
Total valid votes		91,010		
Registered electors		128,305		▲9.67
IC(S) gain from INC(I)		Swing	▼2.12	

=== Assembly Election 1980 ===
1980 Maharashtra Legislative Assembly election : Radhanagari
Party	Candidate	Votes	%	±%
INC(I)	Kadav Haribhau Ramchandra	36,820	42.78%	▲20.60
INC(U)	Patil Hindurao Balwant	25,165	29.24%	New
JP	Patil Shankar Dhondi	23,339	27.12%	New
Independent	Kamble Sharavana Bhiva (S. B. )	737	0.86%	New
Margin of victory		11,655	13.54%	▲11.30
Turnout		87,563	74.85%	▼7.49
Total valid votes		86,061		
Registered electors		116,990		▲7.63
INC(I) gain from INC		Swing	▲9.28	

=== Assembly Election 1978 ===
1978 Maharashtra Legislative Assembly election : Radhanagari
Party	Candidate	Votes	%	±%
INC	Jadhav Dinkerrao Bhauso	29,397	33.50%	▲9.38
JP	Patil Shankar Dhondi	27,435	31.27%	New
INC(I)	Kadav Haribhau Ramchandra	19,463	22.18%	New
CPI	Bhandigare Satapa Ramchandra	11,446	13.05%	▼6.57
Margin of victory		1,962	2.24%	▼9.62
Turnout		89,499	82.34%	▲7.29
Total valid votes		87,741		
Registered electors		108,698		▲13.89
INC gain from Independent		Swing	▼2.48	

=== Assembly Election 1972 ===
1972 Maharashtra Legislative Assembly election : Radhanagari
Party	Candidate	Votes	%	±%
Independent	Krishnaji Gangaram More	25,195	35.98%	New
INC	Baku Abai D. Khandekar	16,891	24.12%	▼11.84
CPI	Kakaso Gupalrao Desai	13,739	19.62%	New
PWPI	Govind Rao T. Kalikate	9,773	13.96%	▼50.08
RPI(K)	B. Dhondiram Thikpurle	4,420	6.31%	New
Margin of victory		8,304	11.86%	▼16.23
Turnout		71,623	75.05%	▼2.04
Total valid votes		70,018		
Registered electors		95,438		▲15.04
Independent gain from PWPI		Swing	▼28.06	

=== Assembly Election 1967 ===
1967 Maharashtra Legislative Assembly election : Radhanagari
Party	Candidate	Votes	%	±%
PWPI	G. T. Kalikate	39,122	64.04%	▲20.96
INC	B. K. Patil	21,965	35.96%	▼20.96
Margin of victory		17,157	28.09%	▲14.26
Turnout		63,953	77.09%	▲16.50
Total valid votes		61,087		
Registered electors		82,959		▲36.76
PWPI gain from INC		Swing	▲7.12	

=== Assembly Election 1962 ===
1962 Maharashtra Legislative Assembly election : Radhanagari
Party	Candidate	Votes	%	±%
INC	Dnyandev Santaram Khandekar	19,476	56.92%	▲26.13
PWPI	Dinkar Nathaji Nalavade	14,742	43.08%	▼26.13
Margin of victory		4,734	13.83%	▼24.60
Turnout		36,754	60.59%	▼0.10
Total valid votes		34,218		
Registered electors		60,661		▲10.97
INC gain from PWPI		Swing	▼12.29	

=== Assembly Election 1957 ===
1957 Bombay State Legislative Assembly election : Radhanagari
Party	Candidate	Votes	%	±%
PWPI	Dnyandev Santaram Khandekar	22,964	69.21%	▲28.31
INC	Sarnaik Narayan Tukaram	10,214	30.79%	▲5.04
Margin of victory		12,750	38.43%	▲23.28
Turnout		33,178	60.69%	▼3.15
Total valid votes		33,178		
Registered electors		54,664		▲14.64
PWPI hold		Swing	▲28.31	

=== Assembly Election 1952 ===
1952 Bombay State Legislative Assembly election : Radhanagari
Party	Candidate	Votes	%	±%
PWPI	Dnyandev Santaram Khandekar	12,451	40.90%	New
INC	Patil Balasaheb Krishnarao	7,839	25.75%	New
Socialist	Patil Chandrakant Ramchandra	6,367	20.92%	New
Independent	Mudhale Dasherat Ramchandra	3,782	12.42%	New
Margin of victory		4,612	15.15%	
Turnout		30,439	63.84%	
Total valid votes		30,439		
Registered electors		47,683		
PWPI win (new seat)				

== See also ==
- Radhanagari
- Kolhapur District
- List of constituencies of Maharashtra Vidhan Sabha
