= Krishnarao Patil =

Indian politician

Krishnarao Parasharam Patil

Member of Legislative Assembly of Maharashtra
- In office 2004–2014
- Constituency: Radhanagari

Personal details
- Party: Nationalist Congress Party
- Other political affiliations: Shiv Sena (UBT)
- Education: Shivaji University

Krishnarao Parasharam Patil alias K.P. Patil is a Nationalist Congress Party politician from Mudal, Bhudargad Tehsil, Kolhapur district, Maharashtra. He was first elected as a Member of the Legislative Assembly in 2004 as an independent candidate against Bajarang Desai, from the Indian National Congress Party former member of Legislative Assembly. He continued in the Legislative Assembly till 2009 for 10 years as the first elected member in the Radhanagari Constituency.

He is chairman of Dudhganga Vedganga Cooperative Sugar Factory Ltd., Bidri, Kagal. He upgraded the factory with a production plant of 20 MW capacity of electricity.

He was defeated in 2014, 2019 and 2024 as a candidate for Legislative Assembly from Radhanagari Vidhan Sabha constituency of Kolhapur, Maharashtra, as a member of Nationalist Congress Party by Shivsena candidate Prakash Aabitkar.
