= Paranda taluka =

Paranda Tahsil
- tehsil
- Location in Maharashtra, India
- Coordinates: 18°18′N 075°29′E
- Country: India
- State: Maharashtra
- District: Osmanabad

Population (2011)
  - Total: 140,436

Language
  - Official: Marathi
- Time zone: UTC+5:30 (IST)
- PIN: 413502
- Lok Sabha constituency: Osmanabad
- Vidhan Sabha constituency: Paranda

Paranda Tahsil is a tahsil (subdistrict) in Osmanabad district, Marathwada region in Maharashtra on Deccan Plateau of India. The town of Paranda is the administrative headquarters of the tahsil. There are seventy-two panchayat villages in Paranda Tahsil.

== Demographics ==
In the 2001 Indian census, Paranda Tahsil had a population of 125,136, with 64,707 (51.7%) males and 60,429 (48.3%) females, for a gender ratio of 934 females per thousand males.

In the 2011 census, Paranda Tahsil had 140,436 inhabitants and a gender ratio of 898 females per thousand males. The tahsil was 86.6% rural. The literacy rate in 2011 was 72.25% overall in Paranda Tahsil, with a rate of 81.32% for males and 62.29% for females. In 2011 in Paranda Tahsil, 11.8% of the population was 0 to 6 years of age.

== Monuments and attractions in the Tahsil ==
- Sina Kolegaon (Kalyan Sagar) Dam is located near the village of Domgaom on the Sina River (Seena River). Migratory birds can also be found in the reservoir. The nearby temple of Kalyan Swami, one of the followers of Ramdas Swami, is now surrounded by water on three sides. The backwater of the dam extends to the village of Sonari, a family weekend resort.

== Villages ==
- Ingoda
