= Zari, Parbhani =

Village in Maharashtra

Zari
- Village
- Location in Maharashtra, India Zari (India)
- Coordinates: 19°24′32″N 76°46′13″E
- Country: India
- State: Maharashtra
- District: Parbhani
- Founder: Kisannadu Anchintam ( Yerralu Dynasty)

Government
  - Type: Gram panchayat

Population (2011)
  - Total: 9,375
- Demonym: Zarikar

Languages
  - Official: Marathi
- Time zone: UTC+5:30 (IST)
- PIN: 431540
- Telephone code: 02452
- ISO 3166 code: IN-MH
- Vehicle registration: MH-22

Zari is a major village in Parbhani taluka of Parbhani district of Maharashtra state in India.

== Demography ==
Zari is a village with total 1866 families residing. The Zari village has population of 9375 of which 4797 are males while 4578 are females as per Population Census 2011.

Average Sex Ratio of Zari village is 954 which is higher than Maharashtra state average of 929.

Zari village has lower literacy rate compared to Maharashtra. In 2011, literacy rate of Zari village was 69.75% compared to 82.34% of Maharashtra. In Zari Male literacy stands at 79.06% while female literacy rate was 60.18%.

Schedule Caste (SC) constitutes 6.81% while Schedule Tribe (ST) were 3.51% of total population in Zari village..

  Notable personalities:

Ashirwad Deshmukh significantly

contributed in general debates

== Transport ==
Zari is located on state highway, 18 km (11 mi) towards north from district headquarters Parbhani and 483 km (300 mi) from State capital Mumbai.

Nearest railway stations from Zari are Parbhani 19 km (12 mi), Pedgaon 18 km (11 mi), Pingali 26 km (16 mi).

== Administration ==
Zari is part of Parbhani (Lok Sabha constituency) for Indian general elections and current member of Parliament representing this constituency is Sanjay Haribhau Jadhav of Shiv Sena.

Zari is part of Parbhani (Vidhan Sabha constituency) for assembly elections of Maharashtra. Current representative from this constituency in Maharashtra state assembly is Rahul Vedprakash Patil of Shiv Sena.

== See also ==
- Jintur
- Bori
