= Sina Kolegaon Dam =

- Location within Maharashtra Location within India
- Official name: Sina Kolegaon Dam D03028
- Location: (Rosa village) Paranda
- Coordinates: 18.3187786°N 75.3957528°E
- Opening date: 2007
- Owners: Government of Maharashtra, India

Dam and spillways
- Impounds: Sina river
- Height: 36.6 m (120 ft)
- Dam volume: 234 km^{3} (56 cu mi)

Reservoir
- Total capacity: 89,340 km^{3} (21,430 cu mi)
- Surface area: 1,529 km^{2} (590 sq mi)

Sina Kolegaon Dam is a dam on Sina river near Paranda, Dharashiv District in the state of Maharashtra in India.

== Specifications ==
The height of the dam above lowest foundation is 36.6 m (120 ft). The volume content is 234 km^{3} (56 cu mi) and gross storage capacity is 150,490.00 km^{3} (36,104.47 cu mi).

== See also ==
- Dams in Maharashtra
- List of reservoirs and dams in India
