= Mudal =

Village in Maharashtra

Mudal मुदाळ
- village
- Location in Maharashtra, India
- Coordinates: 16°24′05″N 74°08′47″E
- Country: India
- State: Maharashtra
- District: Kolhapur
- Taluka: Bhudargad

Government
  - Body: Grampanchayat

Population (2011)
  - Total: 3,487

Languages
  - Official: Marathi
- Time zone: UTC+5:30 (IST)
- PIN: 416208
- Telephone code: 02599
- Vehicle registration: MH-09
- Website: http://www.mudal.mahapanchayat.gov.in/

Mudal is a village in Bhudargad taluka of Kolhapur district in the Indian state of Maharashtra.Near in Adampur

== Demographics ==
As per 2011 census, population of Mudal village is 3487 of which 1806 are male and 1681 are female. Literacy of village is 69.88% against total population.

== Transport ==
Mudal is connected to Kolhapur, Radhanagari and Nipani by highways.
