= Meghana Bordikar =

Indian politician

Meghana Sakore-Bordikar

Minister of state Government of Maharashtra
- Incumbent
- Assumed office 15 December 2024
- Chief Minister: Devendra Fadnavis
- Department: Public Works (Public Undertakings); Energy; Health; Woman & Child Development; Water Supply & Sanitation
- Guardian minister: Parbhani district

Member of Maharashtra Legislative Assembly
- Incumbent
- Assumed office 2019
- Preceded by: Vijay Manikrao Bhamale
- Constituency: Jintur

Personal details
- Born: 10 April 1980 (age 46) Parbhani, Maharashtra
- Party: Bharatiya Janata Party
- Spouse: Deepak Sakore
- Children: 2
- Parents: Ramprasad Kadam Bordikar (father); Minatai Kadam Bordikar (mother)
- Profession: Politician
- Website: www.meghnabordikar.com

Meghana Deepak Sakore-Bordikar is an Indian politician and member of the Bharatiya Janata Party. She was elected to the Maharashtra Legislative Assembly in 2019, winning Jintur assembly constituency in Parbhani. She defeated Vijay Manikrao Bhamale of the Nationalist Congress Party.

== Early life and background ==
Meghna Deepak Sakore-Bordikar, commonly known as Meghna Didi, hails from a prominent political family in Marathwada, Maharashtra. She is the daughter of Ramprasad Kadam Bordikar, a five-term Member of the Legislative Assembly. Although her initial career aspirations did not include politics, her commitment to public service and her understanding of political dynamics led her to enter the political arena. Bordikar began her political journey by contesting local body elections, where she was elected as the group leader of the Zilla Parishad. She is married to Deepak Sakore, an IPS officer, and they have two children.

== Political career ==
Meghna Sakore-Bordikar was elected to the Maharashtra Legislative Assembly in the 2019 elections, representing the Jintur constituency in Parbhani. She won the seat by a margin of 3,717 votes, establishing herself as one of the strongest women politicians in the region.

As a member of the Parbhani Zilla Parishad, she implemented various initiatives aimed at supporting local farmers, including subsidized loans and maintaining fertilizer reserves. Her focus on agricultural development has led to significant improvements in the water sector, sustainable irrigation practices, and the distribution of fertilizers and seeds.

== Major Contributions & Work ==
None
