= Jintur =

Jintur Jainpur
- city
- Location in Maharashtra, India
- Coordinates: 19.62°N 76.7°E
- Country: India
- State: Maharashtra
- District: Parbhani
- Elevation: 455 m (1,493 ft)

Population (2011)
  - Total: 44,291

Language
  - Official: Marathi
- Time zone: UTC+5:30 (IST)
- PIN: 431509

Jintur city is a municipal council in the Parbhani district of Maharashtra, India.

== Geography ==
Jintur is located at 19.62°N 76.7°E. It has an average elevation of 455 metres (1492 feet).

== Demographics ==
As population of 2011 India census, Jintur has population of 44,291 of which 22,616 are males while 21,675 are females. Jintur has female sex ratio is of 958 higher than Maharashtra state average of 929.

Literacy rate of Jintur city is 78.26% lower than state average of 82.34%. In Jintur, Male literacy is around 83.45% while female literacy rate is 72.90%. In Jintur, 14.83% of the population is under 6 years of age.

Schedule Caste (SC) constitutes 8.91% while Schedule Tribe (ST) were 1.80% of total population in Jintur.

== Historical Places ==
=== Shri Digamber Jain Atishya Kshetra Nemgiri Samsthan Jintur ===
An ancient Jain Temple of Shri Digamber Jain is situated in sub hills of Sahyadri Mountains 3 kilometers (2 mi) north of Jintur in Parabhani District of Maharashtra. There are two hills Nemgiri and Chandragiri famous for their ancient artistic and miraculous Jain Cave Temples and Chaityalayas.

=== Nemgiri Hill ===
There are seven caves and Idols of Bhagvan Mahaveer, Bhagvan Adinath, Bhagvan Shantinath, Bhagvan Neminath, Bhagvan Parshwanath, Nandishwara Dweep and Bhagvan Bahubali. In first cave of Nemgiri, an attractive idol of Lord Mahaveer in cross legged seating posture is installed, 3.5 feet in height. This was installed in V.S. 1676. Ancient feet images of Acharya Bhadrabahu also attract pilgrims. In second cave there is an ancient idol of Lord Adinath in state of meditation & penance. In third cave there a 6-foot idol of Lord Shantinath with symbol of deer is seen. Few years ago, black marble has been installed underneath. In a fourth cave 7.5-foot-high beautiful idol of Baghwan Neminath in cross legged seating posture is seen. Bhagvan Neminath idol is the largest Padmasanastha idol and in Cave Number 5 a miraculous idol of Lord Antariksha Parshwanath is staying in the space 3 inches high from surface. This idol is about 6 feet (1.8 m) tall. The tiny sixth cave has 4.5-foot Nandishwar. However it is considered as a Manastambha for Mulnayak Neminath bhagwaan with four heads in four directions. The last one, the seventh cave has an idol standing 5.5 feet high of Lord Bahubali. These temples are at least 400 years old. They were created by King Sanghavi and his family, and currently maintained by the Digamber Jain samaj Jintur. Two more Digamber Jain temples are situated in city, one is Shree Parshvanath Digamber Jain Mandir, with glass work, and another one is Shree Mahaveer Digamber Jain Mandir.

=== Chandragiri Hill ===
A Choubeesee includes standing idols of Lord Shantinath, Kunthunath & Arahnath. These were installed in V.S. 1665.

=== Charthana ===
Name of this village came from the King Charudatta who ruled this area. Charthana has 365 hemadpanthi temples around this area. Apart from it ~40 temples are visible, which include a Barav, and temples built in the 11th century.

== Other Hindu temples ==
1. Shree 1008 Bhagavan Mahaveer Digambar Jain Mandir जिंतूर

2.Shree Chintamani Parasnath Digmbar Jain mandir जिंतूर

3. Shri Nrusimha Temple Varud

4.Sidheshwar temple जिंतूर

5. मैनापुरी संस्थान, जिंतूर

5.अंबा देवी मंदिर, भोगाव

6. जागृत जगदंबा देवी मंदिर,रिडज

7.जागृत हनुमान मंदिर (दस्तापुर), रिडज

8. Sai Baba Mandir

9. Balaji Mandir

10. Gajanan Mandir

11. Gajanan Maharaj Mandir, Halvira

12. Pachalegaon temple

13. Nathuram Maharaj temple

14. Shri Ram mandir

15. Motha Maroti mandir

16. Shri Ramban devi mandir

17. Shree Ishwarshing maharaj Amargad

18. Jay sevalal maharaj Mandir, Amaragad

19. Shree Nagreshwar Mandir

20.Mhasoba Temple Itoli

21.Jagrut Hanuman Mandir Ghagara

22.Bhavani Aai Mandir, Limbala

23.Bharati Math Sansthan, Limbala

24.shri devanand baba ashram dabha

25.Sant Khajebaba Mandir, Kawtha Badnapur

== Education ==
There are many good institutions around the town, like Government Polytechnic Institute, Government Industrial Training Institute, Dyaneshwar Vidyalaya, Bordikar English school New Era English School, Jawahar Vidyalaya, Vilasrao Deshmukh Urdu High School And Junior College‚ Eklavya Balvidya Mandir (primary & secondary), DSM college, Spartan Institute of Education and Research, Jintur, Podar Jumbo Kids, Krantisinh Nana Patil Vastigruh, Shivaji Nagar, Jintur, Dr. Zakair Husain primary and High school jintur, Navoday Gurukul, Dnyanankur Coaching classes.

== Transport ==
City has good connectivity to Parbhani, Hingoli, Nanded, ch shambhaji nagar by road, National Highway 752-k and 752-I goes through jintur route and jintur is major junction for Breakfast, Lunch, dinner for travellers .Nearest Railway Station is Parbhani at 43 km (27 mi). Nearest operational airport are at Nanded 98 km (61 mi) and Aurangabad 160 km (99 mi). There are many buses to Jintur from Parbhani, Nanded and Aurangbad on daily basis.

== See also ==
- Zari
- Bori
- Charthana
- Brahmangaon
- Nemgiri
