= Zari, Palghar =

Village in Maharashtra

Zari
- Town
- Location in Maharashtra, India Zari (India)
- Coordinates: 20.1373991°N 72.8692711°E
- Country: India
- State: Maharashtra
- District: Palghar
- Taluka: Talasari
- Elevation: 56 m (184 ft)

Population (2011)
  - Total: 4,602
- Time zone: UTC+5:30 (IST)
- 2011 census code: 551554

Zari is a town in the Palghar district of Maharashtra, India. It is located in the Talasari taluka.

== Demographics ==
According to the 2011 census of India, Zari has 806 households. The effective literacy rate (i.e. the literacy rate of population excluding children aged 6 and below) is 49.18%.

Demographics (2011 Census)
	Total	Male	Female
Population	4602	2207	2395
Children aged below 6 years	836	411	425
Scheduled caste	8	2	6
Scheduled tribe	4541	2183	2358
Literates	1852	1085	767
Workers (all)	1649	925	724
Main workers (total)	944	579	365
Main workers: Cultivators	540	317	223
Main workers: Agricultural labourers	99	50	49
Main workers: Household industry workers	6	4	2
Main workers: Other	299	208	91
Marginal workers (total)	705	346	359
Marginal workers: Cultivators	221	109	112
Marginal workers: Agricultural labourers	322	118	204
Marginal workers: Household industry workers	3	3	0
Marginal workers: Others	159	116	43
Non-workers	2953	1282	1671
