= Vijay Manikrao Bhamale =

Indian politician

Maharashtra Legislative Assembly
- In office 2014–2019
- Preceded by: Kadam Ramprasad Wamanrao Bordikar
- Succeeded by: Meghana Bordikar
- Constituency: Jintur

Personal details
- Party: Nationalist Congress Party
- Occupation: Politician
- Website: ncp.org.in

Vijay Manikrao Bhambale is an Indian politician and ex-member of the Maharashtra Legislative Assembly.

== Constituency ==
Bhambale represents the Jintur (Vidhan Sabha constituency) of Maharashtra.

== Political party ==
Bhambale is from the Nationalist Congress Party. Also he is district president of NCP from 2009 to 2016.
