= Brahmangaon =

- Location in Bangladesh
- Coordinates: 23°3′N 90°13′E
- Country: Bangladesh
- Division: Barisal Division
- District: Bikrampur District(Now Munshiganj)
- Time zone: UTC+6 (Bangladesh Time)

Brahmangaon is a village situated in Kanaksar village in Lowhajanj Upozila of Bikrampur, now Munshiganj district in the central Bangladesh.
