= Jintur Assembly constituency =

Constituency of the Maharashtra legislative assembly in India

Coordinates: 19.61°N 76.69°E

Jintur
- Constituency No. 95 for the Maharashtra Legislative Assembly

Constituency details
- Country: India
- Region: Western India
- State: Maharashtra
- District: Parbhani
- Lok Sabha constituency: Parbhani
- Established: 1952
- Total electors: 388,388
- Reservation: None

Member of Legislative Assembly
- 15th Maharashtra Legislative Assembly
- Incumbent Meghana Bordikar
- Party: Bhartiya Janata Party
- Elected year: 2024

Jintur Assembly constituency is one of 288 assembly constituencies of the Maharashtra state of India. It comes under Parbhani (Lok Sabha constituency) for the Indian general elections.

This constituency includes Jintur and Sailu tehsils.

The current member of the legislative assembly (MLA) from this constituency is Meghana Bordikar of the Bhartiya Janata Party who defeated Vijay Bhamble of the Nationalist Congress Party by vote margin of 3,717. The first MLA was Sushantdada Jadhav.

== Members of the Legislative Assembly ==
Election	Member	Party
1952	Bhujang Rao	Peasants and Workers Party of India
1957	Wamanrao Anandrao	Indian National Congress
1962	Wamanrao Anandrao	Indian National Congress
1967	S. W. Kalamkar	Indian National Congress
1972	Sheshrao Deshmukh	Peasants and Workers Party of India
1978	Gulabchand Nandlaji Rathi	Peasants and Workers Party of India
1980	Keshavrao Bhamble	Indian National Congress (I)
1985	Ganeshrao Dudhgaonkar	Indian National Congress
1990	Ramprasad Kadam Bordikar	Indian National Congress
1995	Ramprasad Kadam Bordikar	Indian National Congress
1999	Kundlikrao Nagre	Indian National Congress
2004	Ramprasad Kadam Bordikar	Independent politician
2009	Ramprasad Kadam Bordikar	Indian National Congress
2014	Vijay Manikrao Bhamale	Nationalist Congress Party
2019	Meghana Sakore-Bordikar	Bharatiya Janata Party
2024	Meghana Sakore-Bordikar	Bharatiya Janata Party

== Election results ==
=== Assembly Election 2024 ===
2024 Maharashtra Legislative Assembly election : Jintur
Party	Candidate	Votes	%	±%
BJP	Meghana Bordikar	113,432	38.70%	▼7.02
NCP-SP	Vijay Manikrao Bhamale	108,916	37.16%	New
VBA	Suresh Nagre	56,474	19.27%	▲14.12
Independent	Vinod Dattatray Bhavale	7,430	2.53%	New
NOTA	None of the above	1,335	0.46%	▼0.11
Margin of victory		4,516	1.54%	▲0.09
Turnout		294,442	75.81%	▲2.52
Total valid votes		293,107		
Registered electors		388,388		▲10.68
BJP hold		Swing	▼7.02	

=== Assembly Election 2019 ===
2019 Maharashtra Legislative Assembly election : Jintur
Party	Candidate	Votes	%	±%
BJP	Meghana Bordikar	116,913	45.72%	▲32.96
NCP	Vijay Manikrao Bhamale	113,196	44.27%	▼0.74
VBA	Manohar Wakle	13,172	5.15%	New
Independent	Kharabe Ram patil	4,727	1.85%	New
CPI	Ankush Rathod	1,792	0.70%	▼0.26
NOTA	None of the above	1,460	0.57%	▼0.30
Margin of victory		3,717	1.45%	▼10.07
Turnout		257,203	73.29%	▼0.67
Total valid votes		255,697		
Registered electors		350,923		▲8.27
BJP gain from NCP		Swing	▲0.71	

=== Assembly Election 2014 ===
2014 Maharashtra Legislative Assembly election : Jintur
Party	Candidate	Votes	%	±%
NCP	Vijay Manikrao Bhamale	106,912	45.01%	New
INC	Ramprasad Kadam Bordikar	79,554	33.49%	▼5.64
BJP	Sanjay Sadegaonkar	30,310	12.76%	New
SS	Kharabe Ram Patil	6,962	2.93%	▼12.73
CPI	Comrade Rajan Kshirsagar	2,291	0.96%	New
BSP	Bhagwan Prabhuappa Gunjkar	2,179	0.92%	▼0.05
NOTA	None of the above	2,070	0.87%	New
Independent	Ad. Laxmanrao Punjaji Bansode	1,626	0.68%	New
Margin of victory		27,358	11.52%	▲10.89
Turnout		239,715	73.96%	▲5.38
Total valid votes		237,549		
Registered electors		324,115		▲13.78
NCP gain from INC		Swing	▲5.88	

=== Assembly Election 2009 ===
2009 Maharashtra Legislative Assembly election : Jintur
Party	Candidate	Votes	%	±%
INC	Ramprasad Kadam Bordikar	76,427	39.13%	▲18.88
Independent	Vijay Manikrao Bhamale	75,202	38.50%	New
SS	Lahane Haribhau	30,576	15.66%	▲2.94
Independent	Salve Sudhakar	3,333	1.71%	New
RSPS	Sheikh Salim Pahelwan	2,477	1.27%	New
BSP	Waghmare Yogiraj Savlaram	1,894	0.97%	▼13.35
Independent	Sayyed Anwar Sayyed Isa	1,495	0.77%	New
Independent	Sayyed Dilawar Sayyed Jamal	1,429	0.73%	New
Margin of victory		1,225	0.63%	▼24.11
Turnout		195,370	68.58%	▼3.86
Total valid votes		195,305		
Registered electors		284,870		▲41.82
INC gain from Independent		Swing	▼5.86	

=== Assembly Election 2004 ===
2004 Maharashtra Legislative Assembly election : Jintur
Party	Candidate	Votes	%	±%
Independent	Kadam Ramprasad Wamanrao Bordikar	65,451	44.99%	New
INC	Kundlikrao Bhagwanrao Nagre	29,458	20.25%	▼20.70
BSP	Vijay Manikrao Bhamale	20,830	14.32%	New
SS	Adv. Dudhgaonkar Ganeshrao Nagorao	18,507	12.72%	▼7.78
Independent	More Shivajirao Daulatrao	2,818	1.94%	New
Independent	Shendre Anil Dhuraji	2,519	1.73%	New
Independent	Photographer Dnyaneshwar Maroti Kukde	2,283	1.57%	New
Independent	Kishanrao Janardanrao Deshmukh	1,226	0.84%	New
Margin of victory		35,993	24.74%	▲21.84
Turnout		145,502	72.44%	▲1.29
Total valid votes		145,472		
Registered electors		200,869		▲18.15
Independent gain from INC		Swing	▲4.04	

=== Assembly Election 1999 ===
1999 Maharashtra Legislative Assembly election : Jintur
Party	Candidate	Votes	%	±%
INC	Kundlikrao Bhagwanrao Nagre	46,285	40.95%	▲0.06
NCP	Kadam Ramprasadji Wamanrao	43,004	38.05%	New
SS	Bangar Pratap Ganpatrao	23,172	20.50%	▲12.78
Margin of victory		3,281	2.90%	▼3.99
Turnout		120,960	71.15%	▼6.05
Total valid votes		113,016		
Registered electors		170,008		▲4.56
INC hold		Swing	▲0.06	

=== Assembly Election 1995 ===
1995 Maharashtra Legislative Assembly election : Jintur
Party	Candidate	Votes	%	±%
INC	Kadam Ramprasadji Wamanrao	49,690	40.89%	▼1.44
JD	Bangar Pratap Ganpatrao	41,314	33.99%	New
SS	Magar Shankarrao Jijaram	9,381	7.72%	▼25.59
Independent	More Shivajirao Daulatrao	6,247	5.14%	New
Independent	Thite Ramkishan Kashiramji	4,915	4.04%	New
Independent	Dudhgaonkar Raut Ashok Limbajirao	2,572	2.12%	New
BBM	Chawan Sheshekalabai Kamalsingh	1,510	1.24%	New
Independent	Bakan Dashrath Marotrao	1,120	0.92%	New
Margin of victory		8,376	6.89%	▼2.12
Turnout		125,521	77.20%	▲12.48
Total valid votes		121,532		
Registered electors		162,586		▲2.94
INC hold		Swing	▼1.44	

=== Assembly Election 1990 ===
1990 Maharashtra Legislative Assembly election : Jintur
Party	Candidate	Votes	%	±%
INC	Kadam Ramprasadji Wamanrao	42,149	42.33%	▼3.14
SS	Bhamble Ramprasad Wamanrao	33,175	33.31%	New
PWPI	Gangadhar Keshevrao Ghuge	18,318	18.39%	▼15.98
Independent	Harishchandra Somaji Rathod	2,481	2.49%	New
Independent	Pathan Sharifkhan Jumma Khan	1,490	1.50%	New
Margin of victory		8,974	9.01%	▼2.09
Turnout		102,221	64.72%	▲2.44
Total valid votes		99,583		
Registered electors		157,942		▲28.55
INC hold		Swing	▼3.14	

=== Assembly Election 1985 ===
1985 Maharashtra Legislative Assembly election : Jintur
Party	Candidate	Votes	%	±%
INC	Ganeshrao Dudhgaonkar	33,833	45.47%	New
PWPI	Deshmukh Seshrao Apparao	25,574	34.37%	▲11.72
Independent	Bangar Pratap Ganpatrao	11,118	14.94%	New
Independent	Neetnawre Sakharam Ganoji	1,980	2.66%	New
Independent	Rathod Madhukar Dharma	775	1.04%	New
Independent	Bhalerao Sakharam Laxman	578	0.78%	New
Independent	Yadve Ramsamud Bhorhu	542	0.73%	New
Margin of victory		8,259	11.10%	▼2.46
Turnout		76,520	62.28%	▲7.38
Total valid votes		74,400		
Registered electors		122,865		▲9.52
INC gain from INC(I)		Swing	▲5.60	

=== Assembly Election 1980 ===
1980 Maharashtra Legislative Assembly election : Jintur
Party	Candidate	Votes	%	±%
INC(I)	Bhamble Manikrao Keshavrao	23,862	39.87%	▲9.39
INC(U)	Chavan Sunderrao Kishanrao	15,747	26.31%	New
PWPI	Nagre Nagorao Suryabhanji	13,553	22.65%	▼8.97
Independent	Bansode Laxman Punjaji	4,004	6.69%	New
Independent	Deshmukh Rahesr Warrao Balaji	2,071	3.46%	New
Independent	Magar Subhashrao Sakharam	610	1.02%	New
Margin of victory		8,115	13.56%	▲12.41
Turnout		61,586	54.90%	▲1.14
Total valid votes		59,847		
Registered electors		112,183		▲6.72
INC(I) gain from PWPI		Swing	▲8.25	

=== Assembly Election 1978 ===
1978 Maharashtra Legislative Assembly election : Jintur
Party	Candidate	Votes	%	±%
PWPI	Rathi Gulabchand Nandlaji	17,247	31.62%	▼30.47
INC(I)	Bhamble Manikrao Keshavrao	16,621	30.48%	New
INC	Ghuge Khushalrao Madhavrao	13,149	24.11%	▼0.81
JP	Thite Bhagwanrao Ramchandra	3,989	7.31%	New
Independent	Pawar Sakharam Kondji	3,532	6.48%	New
Margin of victory		626	1.15%	▼36.02
Turnout		56,509	53.76%	▲6.79
Total valid votes		54,538		
Registered electors		105,119		▲12.11
PWPI hold		Swing	▼30.47	

=== Assembly Election 1972 ===
1972 Maharashtra Legislative Assembly election : Jintur
Party	Candidate	Votes	%	±%
PWPI	Sheshrao Deshmukh	26,306	62.09%	▲18.88
INC	Anandrao Deshmukh	10,559	24.92%	▼25.80
Independent	Shinde Ramrao Khanderao	3,727	8.80%	New
RPI	Pawar Sakharam Kondji	1,775	4.19%	New
Margin of victory		15,747	37.17%	▲29.66
Turnout		44,041	46.97%	▼9.68
Total valid votes		42,367		
Registered electors		93,767		▲11.72
PWPI gain from INC		Swing	▲11.37	

=== Assembly Election 1967 ===
1967 Maharashtra Legislative Assembly election : Tintur
Party	Candidate	Votes	%	±%
INC	S. W. Kalamkar	22,334	50.72%	▲2.32
PWPI	S. A. Deshmukh	19,026	43.21%	▲12.93
ABJS	N. D. Kotheker	2,671	6.07%	New
Margin of victory		3,308	7.51%	▼10.62
Turnout		47,545	56.65%	▲20.21
Total valid votes		44,031		
Registered electors		83,928		▼0.48
INC hold		Swing	▲2.32	

=== Assembly Election 1962 ===
1962 Maharashtra Legislative Assembly election : Jintur
Party	Candidate	Votes	%	±%
INC	Wamanrao Anandrao	14,097	48.40%	▼5.83
PWPI	Hariharrao Anandrao	8,818	30.28%	▲8.95
PSP	Nandlal Laxminarayan	3,947	13.55%	New
Independent	Sitaram Malhari	2,263	7.77%	New
Margin of victory		5,279	18.13%	▼11.67
Turnout		30,734	36.44%	▲9.49
Total valid votes		29,125		
Registered electors		84,335		▲21.19
INC hold		Swing	▼5.83	

=== Assembly Election 1957 ===
1957 Bombay State Legislative Assembly election : Jintur
Party	Candidate	Votes	%	±%
INC	Wamanrao Anandrao	10,170	54.23%	▲32.39
Independent	Nandlal Laxminarayan	4,582	24.43%	New
PWPI	Mohammed Pasha S/o Abdul Kadar	4,000	21.33%	▼47.87
Margin of victory		5,588	29.80%	▼17.56
Turnout		18,752	26.95%	▼6.96
Total valid votes		18,752		
Registered electors		69,588		▲31.79
INC gain from PWPI		Swing	▼14.97	

=== Assembly Election 1952 ===
1952 Hyderabad State Legislative Assembly election : Jintur
Party	Candidate	Votes	%	±%
PWPI	Bhujang Rao	12,393	69.20%	New
INC	Sundrarlal Vardhasa	3,911	21.84%	New
PDF	Vinayak Rao	1,604	8.96%	New
Margin of victory		8,482	47.36%	
Turnout		17,908	33.91%	
Total valid votes		17,908		
Registered electors		52,803		
PWPI win (new seat)				
