= Karvir Assembly constituency =

Constituency of the Maharashtra legislative assembly in India

Coordinates: 16.70°N 74.22°E

Karvir
- Constituency No. 275 for the Maharashtra Legislative Assembly

Constituency details
- Country: India
- Region: Western India
- State: Maharashtra
- District: Kolhapur
- Lok Sabha constituency: Kolhapur
- Established: 1952
- Total electors: 325,842
- Reservation: None

Member of Legislative Assembly
- 15th Maharashtra Legislative Assembly
- Incumbent Chandradip Narke
- Party: SHS
- Alliance: NDA
- Elected year: 2024

Karvir Assembly constituency is one of the 288 Vidhan Sabha (legislative assembly) constituencies of Maharashtra state, western India. This constituency is located in Kolhapur district.

== Geographical scope ==
The constituency comprises Gagan Bavda taluka, Bajar Bhogaon and Kale revenue circles of Panhala taluka, Kuditre, Nigave, Dumala, Haladi, Beed and Sangrul revenue circles of Karvir taluka.

== Members of the Legislative Assembly ==
Election	Member	Party
1952	Sarnaik Narayan Tukaram	Independent politician
1962	Dinkarrao Vithalrao Mudrale	Indian National Congress
1967	Shripatrao S. Bondre	Indian National Congress
1972	Shripatrao S. Bondre	Indian National Congress
1978	Patil Rajaram Babaji	Indian National Congress
1980	Digvijay Bhauso Khanvilkar	Indian National Congress
1985	Digvijay Bhauso Khanvilkar	Indian National Congress
1990	Digvijay Bhauso Khanvilkar	Indian National Congress
1995	Digvijay Bhauso Khanvilkar	Indian National Congress
1999	Digvijay Bhauso Khanvilkar	Nationalist Congress Party
2004	Satej Patil	Independent politician
2009	Chandradeep Shashikant Narake	Shiv Sena
2014	Chandradeep Shashikant Narake	Shiv Sena
2019	P. N. Patil-Sadolikar	Indian National Congress
2024	Chandradeep Shashikant Narake	Shiv Sena

== Election results ==
=== Assembly Election 2024 ===
2024 Maharashtra Legislative Assembly election : Karvir
Party	Candidate	Votes	%	±%
SS	Chandradeep Shashikant Narake	134,528	48.37	▲4.07
INC	Rahul Patil Sadolikar	132,552	47.66	▼5.52
JSS	Santaji F. Ghorpade	7,931	2.85	New
NOTA	None of the above	688	0.25	▼0.25
Margin of victory		1,976	0.71	▼8.17
Turnout		278,799	85.56	▲1.15
Total valid votes		278,111		
Registered electors		325,842		▲7.17
SS gain from INC		Swing	▼4.81	

=== Assembly Election 2019 ===
2019 Maharashtra Legislative Assembly election : Karvir
Party	Candidate	Votes	%	±%
INC	P. N. Patil-Sadolikar	135,675	53.18	▲9.08
SS	Chandradeep Shashikant Narake	113,014	44.30	▼0.09
VBA	Dr. Ananda Dadu Gurav	4,412	1.73	New
NOTA	None of the above	1,284	0.50	▲0.18
Margin of victory		22,661	8.88	▲8.59
Turnout		256,640	84.41	▲0.05
Total valid votes		255,129		
Registered electors		304,044		▲5.03
INC gain from SS		Swing	▲8.79	

=== Assembly Election 2014 ===
2014 Maharashtra Legislative Assembly election : Karvir
Party	Candidate	Votes	%	±%
SS	Chandradeep Shashikant Narake	107,998	44.39	▼0.06
INC	P. N. Patil-Sadolikar	107,288	44.10	▲2.25
JSS	Raju Suryawanshi (Bhau)	18,964	7.80	New
BJP	Chougale Kerba Shripati (K. S. Aanna)	5,258	2.16	New
NOTA	None of the above	789	0.32	New
Margin of victory		710	0.29	▼2.31
Turnout		244,223	84.36	▲0.54
Total valid votes		243,283		
Registered electors		289,489		▲12.04
SS hold		Swing	▼0.06	

=== Assembly Election 2009 ===
2009 Maharashtra Legislative Assembly election : Karvir
Party	Candidate	Votes	%	±%
SS	Chandradeep Shashikant Narake	96,232	44.45	New
INC	P. N. Patil-Sadolikar	90,608	41.85	New
PWPI	Pawar Patil Sampatrao Shamrao	23,190	10.71	New
BSP	Kurane Sanjay Sudam	2,223	1.03	▼0.06
Independent	Patil Pandurang Nivrutti	1,993	0.92	New
Independent	Pai. Bajrang Krishana Patil	1,299	0.60	New
Margin of victory		5,624	2.60	▼19.30
Turnout		216,579	83.82	▲8.46
Total valid votes		216,494		
Registered electors		258,387		▲0.08
SS gain from Independent		Swing	▼15.65	

=== Assembly Election 2004 ===
2004 Maharashtra Legislative Assembly election : Karvir
Party	Candidate	Votes	%	±%
Independent	Satej Patil	116,909	60.10	New
NCP	Digvijay Bhauso Khanvilkar	74,305	38.20	▼10.14
BSP	Mohite Dilip Jamal	2,112	1.09	New
Independent	Kamble Sadashiv Lala	1,199	0.62	New
Margin of victory		42,604	21.90	▲9.38
Turnout		194,572	75.36	▲14.24
Total valid votes		194,525		
Registered electors		258,178		▲13.35
Independent gain from NCP		Swing	▲11.76	

=== Assembly Election 1999 ===
1999 Maharashtra Legislative Assembly election : Karvir
Party	Candidate	Votes	%	±%
NCP	Digvijay Bhauso Khanvilkar	64,526	48.34	New
INC	Bondre Subhash Alias Chandrakant Shripatrao	47,816	35.82	▼13.60
BJP	Sangramsingh Jaysingrao Gaikwad	21,144	15.84	▲8.52
Margin of victory		16,710	12.52	▼6.95
Turnout		139,205	61.12	▼14.48
Total valid votes		133,486		
Registered electors		227,775		▲4.50
NCP gain from INC		Swing	▼1.08	

=== Assembly Election 1995 ===
1995 Maharashtra Legislative Assembly election : Karvir
Party	Candidate	Votes	%	±%
INC	Digvijay Bhauso Khanvilkar	80,033	49.42	▼5.74
Independent	Mahadik Mahadeorao Ramchandra	48,501	29.95	New
Independent	B. R. Patil	13,878	8.57	New
BJP	Vijay @ Baba Desai	11,848	7.32	New
JD	Manohar Vasantrao Mane	3,944	2.44	New
Margin of victory		31,532	19.47	▼4.40
Turnout		164,785	75.60	▲11.70
Total valid votes		161,957		
Registered electors		217,957		▲21.34
INC hold		Swing	▼5.74	

=== Assembly Election 1990 ===
1990 Maharashtra Legislative Assembly election : Karvir
Party	Candidate	Votes	%	±%
INC	Digvijay Bhauso Khanvilkar	62,417	55.16	▲0.78
Independent	S. R. Patil	35,404	31.29	New
Independent	Dilip Bhivate	7,689	6.80	New
PWPI	H. K. Salokhe	3,382	2.99	New
Independent	K. J. Rupeja	2,967	2.62	New
Margin of victory		27,013	23.87	▲5.44
Turnout		114,787	63.90	▲2.59
Total valid votes		113,151		
Registered electors		179,626		▲27.20
INC hold		Swing	▲0.78	

=== Assembly Election 1985 ===
1985 Maharashtra Legislative Assembly election : Karvir
Party	Candidate	Votes	%	±%
INC	Digvijay Bhauso Khanvilkar	46,531	54.38	New
IC(S)	Patil H. D. (Baba)	30,759	35.95	New
Independent	Pandurang Dnyandeo Patil	7,461	8.72	New
Independent	M. D. Nalawade	613	0.72	New
Margin of victory		15,772	18.43	▲14.22
Turnout		86,582	61.31	▲2.14
Total valid votes		85,561		
Registered electors		141,217		▲15.45
INC gain from INC(I)		Swing	▲7.58	

=== Assembly Election 1980 ===
1980 Maharashtra Legislative Assembly election : Karvir
Party	Candidate	Votes	%	±%
INC(I)	Digvijay Bhauso Khanvilkar	33,346	46.80	▲31.27
INC(U)	Patil S. R. Alias Shamrao Ramaji	30,347	42.59	New
Independent	Patil Shankarrao Datatraya (Singanapurkar)	4,473	6.28	New
PWPI	Salokhe Balwant Hanmant	1,522	2.14	▼18.00
Independent	Ulepe Laxmanrao Sakharam	949	1.33	New
JP	Patil P. G. Alias Pandurang Ganpatrao	612	0.86	New
Margin of victory		2,999	4.21	▼1.34
Turnout		72,371	59.17	▼14.33
Total valid votes		71,249		
Registered electors		122,318		▲9.99
INC(I) gain from INC		Swing	▲12.78	

=== Assembly Election 1978 ===
1978 Maharashtra Legislative Assembly election : Karvir
Party	Candidate	Votes	%	±%
INC	Patil Rajaram Babaji	27,329	34.02	▼40.41
JP	Patil Dayandeo Yashwant	22,874	28.47	New
PWPI	Patil Babasaheb Dayanu	16,181	20.14	▼5.43
INC(I)	Digvijay Bhauso Khanvilkar	12,479	15.53	New
Independent	Jagtap Dadasaheb Dnyandeo	1,130	1.41	New
Margin of victory		4,455	5.55	▼43.31
Turnout		81,743	73.50	▼1.99
Total valid votes		80,341		
Registered electors		111,210		▲11.51
INC hold		Swing	▼40.41	

=== Assembly Election 1972 ===
1972 Maharashtra Legislative Assembly election : Karvir
Party	Candidate	Votes	%	±%
INC	Shripatrao S. Bondre	54,424	74.43	▲20.21
PWPI	Hindurao K. Salokhe	18,698	25.57	New
Margin of victory		35,726	48.86	▲38.88
Turnout		75,287	75.49	▼0.02
Total valid votes		73,122		
Registered electors		99,735		▲21.90
INC hold		Swing	▲20.21	

=== Assembly Election 1967 ===
1967 Maharashtra Legislative Assembly election : Karvir
Party	Candidate	Votes	%	±%
INC	Shripatrao S. Bondre	31,060	54.22	▼19.25
SSP	R. R. Sabnis	25,343	44.24	New
Independent	B. B. Patil	879	1.53	New
Margin of victory		5,717	9.98	▼38.83
Turnout		61,779	75.51	▲11.02
Total valid votes		57,282		
Registered electors		81,820		▲10.32
INC hold		Swing	▼19.25	

=== Assembly Election 1962 ===
1962 Maharashtra Legislative Assembly election : Karvir
Party	Candidate	Votes	%	±%
INC	Dinkarrao Vithalrao Mudrale	33,363	73.47	▲51.52
Independent	Ramchandr Ravaji Yadav	11,198	24.66	New
Independent	Yeshwant Appaji Ghatage	851	1.87	New
Margin of victory		22,165	48.81	▲38.74
Turnout		47,831	64.49	▲19.70
Total valid votes		45,412		
Registered electors		74,163		▲51.88
INC gain from Independent		Swing	▲41.44	

=== Assembly Election 1952 ===
1952 Bombay State Legislative Assembly election : Karvir
Party	Candidate	Votes	%	±%
Independent	Sarnaik Narayan Tukaram	7,004	32.03	New
INC	Indulkar Ganpatrao Shankarroa	4,801	21.95	New
PWPI	Haladkar Pandurang Hari	4,733	21.64	New
SCF	Dige Shankar Khanderao	4,223	19.31	New
Independent	Deshpande Yeshwant Narayan	1,108	5.07	New
Margin of victory		2,203	10.07	
Turnout		21,869	44.79	
Total valid votes		21,869		
Registered electors		48,830		
Independent win (new seat)				
