= Paranda Assembly constituency =

Constituency of the Maharashtra legislative assembly in India

Coordinates: 18°16′02.48″N 75°26′25.46″E

Paranda
- Constituency No. 243 for the Maharashtra Legislative Assembly

Constituency details
- Country: India
- Region: Western India
- State: Maharashtra
- District: Dharashiv
- Lok Sabha constituency: Osmanabad
- Established: 1951
- Total electors: 331,546
- Reservation: None

Member of Legislative Assembly
- 15th Maharashtra Legislative Assembly
- Incumbent Tanaji Sawant
- Party: SHS
- Alliance: NDA
- Elected year: 2019

Paranda Assembly constituency is one of the 288 Vidhan Sabha (legislative assembly) constituencies of Maharashtra state in western India.

== Overview ==
Paranda (constituency number 243) is one of the four Vidhan Sabha constituencies located in Osmanabad district. It covers the entire Paranda, Bhum and Washi tehsils. The number of electors in 2009 was 268,195 (male 142,381, female 125,814).

Paranda is part of Osmanabad Lok Sabha constituency along with five other Vidhan Sabha constituencies, namely Umarga, Tuljapur and Osmanabad in Osmanabad district, Barshi in Solapur district and Ausa in Latur district.

== Members of the Legislative Assembly ==
Election	Member	Party
1952	Vishwas Rao	Peasants and Workers Party of India
1962	Krishnaji Bajirao	Peasants and Workers Party of India
1967	K. H. Patil	Indian National Congress
1972	Vasudeo Anandrao Deshmukh	Republican Party of India
1978	Vasudeo Anandrao Deshmukh	Janata Party
1980	Chandansingh Baban Singh Saddiwal	Indian National Congress
1985	Anandrao Maharudra Mote	Indian Congress
1990	Anandrao Maharudra Mote	Indian National Congress
1995	Dnyaneshwar Patil	Shiv Sena
1999	Dnyaneshwar Patil	Shiv Sena
2004	Rahul Maharudra Mote	Nationalist Congress Party
2009	Rahul Maharudra Mote	Nationalist Congress Party
2014	Rahul Maharudra Mote	Nationalist Congress Party
2019	Dr. Tanaji Jayawant Sawant	Shiv Sena
2024	Dr. Tanaji Jayawant Sawant	Shiv Sena

== Election results ==
=== Assembly Election 2024 ===
2024 Maharashtra Legislative Assembly election : Paranda
Party	Candidate	Votes	%	±%
SS	Dr. Tanaji Jayawant Sawant	103,254	44.31%	▼5.76
NCP-SP	Rahul Maharudra Mote	101,745	43.66%	New
VBA	Pravin Parmeshwar Ranbagul	12,698	5.45%	▼7.66
Independent	Jameelkha Mahebub Pathan	4,446	1.91%	New
RSPS	Dr. Rahul Bhimrao Ghule	2,170	0.93%	New
NOTA	None of the above	688	0.30%	▼0.59
Margin of victory		1,509	0.65%	▼14.79
Turnout		233,715	70.49%	▲2.18
Total valid votes		233,027		
Registered electors		331,546		▲5.35
SS hold		Swing	▼5.76	

=== Assembly Election 2019 ===
2019 Maharashtra Legislative Assembly election : Paranda
Party	Candidate	Votes	%	±%
SS	Dr. Tanaji Jayawant Sawant	106,674	50.07%	▲16.31
NCP	Rahul Maharudra Mote	73,772	34.62%	▼5.46
VBA	Suryakant (Suresh Bhau) Chandrakant Kamble	27,939	13.11%	New
NOTA	None of the above	1,902	0.89%	▲0.30
Margin of victory		32,902	15.44%	▲9.12
Turnout		214,975	68.31%	▲1.47
Total valid votes		213,064		
Registered electors		314,711		▲6.68
SS gain from NCP		Swing	▲9.99	

=== Assembly Election 2014 ===
2014 Maharashtra Legislative Assembly election : Paranda
Party	Candidate	Votes	%	±%
NCP	Rahul Maharudra Mote	78,548	40.08%	▼6.36
SS	Dnyaneshwar Raosaheb Patil	66,159	33.76%	▼9.34
RSPS	Balasaheb Bhagwantrao Patil	37,324	19.05%	▲14.29
INC	Choudhari Nuroddin M. Yunus M. Idris	7,760	3.96%	New
MNS	Ganesh Dattatray Shendge	2,426	1.24%	New
BSP	Agwane Sangeeta Balaji	1,256	0.64%	▼0.32
NOTA	None of the above	1,151	0.59%	New
Margin of victory		12,389	6.32%	▲2.98
Turnout		197,191	66.84%	▼0.17
Total valid votes		195,957		
Registered electors		294,998		▲9.99
NCP hold		Swing	▼6.36	

=== Assembly Election 2009 ===
2009 Maharashtra Legislative Assembly election : Paranda
Party	Candidate	Votes	%	±%
NCP	Rahul Maharudra Mote	83,425	46.44%	▲6.39
SS	Shankar Ambrushi Borkar	77,423	43.10%	▲19.77
RSPS	Suresh (Bhau) Alias Suryakant Chandrakant Kamble	8,546	4.76%	▼27.11
BBM	Bansode Tanaji Bhima	1,866	1.04%	New
BSP	Rajguru Trimbakrao Kukade	1,718	0.96%	▼0.15
Independent	Saraswati Suresh Waghmode	1,513	0.84%	New
Margin of victory		6,002	3.34%	▼4.85
Turnout		179,716	67.01%	▼6.01
Total valid votes		179,656		
Registered electors		268,195		▲39.51
NCP hold		Swing	▲6.39	

=== Assembly Election 2004 ===
2004 Maharashtra Legislative Assembly election : Paranda
Party	Candidate	Votes	%	±%
NCP	Rahul Maharudra Mote	56,225	40.05%	▲23.65
RSPS	Balasaheb Bhagwantrao Patil	44,734	31.87%	New
SS	Dnyaneshwar Raosaheb Patil	32,754	23.33%	▼0.27
IJP	Kulkarni Vijaykumar Raosaheb	2,075	1.48%	New
BSP	Kagade Jayram Haridas	1,557	1.11%	New
Margin of victory		11,491	8.19%	▲0.99
Turnout		140,380	73.02%	▼1.01
Total valid votes		140,370		
Registered electors		192,246		▲17.00
NCP gain from SS		Swing	▲16.45	

=== Assembly Election 1999 ===
1999 Maharashtra Legislative Assembly election : Paranda
Party	Candidate	Votes	%	±%
SS	Dnyaneshwar Raosaheb Patil	26,818	23.60%	▼8.11
NCP	Tatyasaheb Tulsiram Gore	18,633	16.40%	New
Independent	Balasaheb Bhagwantrao Patil	17,124	15.07%	New
Independent	Annasaheb Sambhajirao Deshmukh	16,851	14.83%	New
Independent	Andhare Mahadeo Abhiman	10,018	8.82%	New
INC	Sul Rohidas Dagdu	9,058	7.97%	▼19.08
Independent	Thorat Dhanjirao Amarsinh	8,196	7.21%	New
Independent	Gaikwad Kundlik Anna	2,650	2.33%	New
Margin of victory		8,185	7.20%	▲2.58
Turnout		121,642	74.03%	▲2.17
Total valid votes		113,624		
Registered electors		164,312		▼7.49
SS hold		Swing	▼8.11	

=== Assembly Election 1995 ===
1995 Maharashtra Legislative Assembly election : Paranda
Party	Candidate	Votes	%	±%
SS	Dnyaneshwar Patil	39,424	31.71%	▲18.09
Independent	Vijaysinh Amarsinh Thorat	33,682	27.09%	New
INC	Anandrao Maharudra Mote	33,623	27.05%	▼28.96
Independent	Ranjitsinh Sadashivrao Patil	7,150	5.75%	New
PWPI	Chede Panditrao Ganpatrao	3,445	2.77%	▼23.79
Independent	Vishwekar Basling Shantling	3,185	2.56%	New
Independent	Patil Hanumant Baburao	1,136	0.91%	New
Doordarshi Party	Patil Ishwar Kisan	999	0.80%	▲0.45
Margin of victory		5,742	4.62%	▼24.82
Turnout		127,637	71.86%	▲5.64
Total valid votes		124,318		
Registered electors		177,616		▲9.36
SS gain from INC		Swing	▼24.30	

=== Assembly Election 1990 ===
1990 Maharashtra Legislative Assembly election : Paranda
Party	Candidate	Votes	%	±%
INC	Anandrao Maharudra Mote	58,912	56.01%	▲25.34
PWPI	Chede Panditrao Ganpatrao	27,941	26.56%	New
SS	Gaikwad Kundlik Anna	14,322	13.62%	New
Independent	Patil Hanmanirao Baburao	2,390	2.27%	New
Margin of victory		30,971	29.44%	▲14.50
Turnout		107,543	66.22%	▼2.00
Total valid votes		105,183		
Registered electors		162,411		▲24.63
INC gain from IC(S)		Swing	▲10.40	

=== Assembly Election 1985 ===
1985 Maharashtra Legislative Assembly election : Paranda
Party	Candidate	Votes	%	±%
IC(S)	Anandrao Maharudra Mote	39,755	45.61%	New
INC	Shankarrao Bhagwantrao Talekar	26,737	30.67%	New
Independent	Deshmukh Vasudeo Alias Nanasaheb	11,303	12.97%	New
Independent	Bhaskarrao Bhaurao Markad	8,967	10.29%	New
Margin of victory		13,018	14.94%	▲8.67
Turnout		88,905	68.22%	▲6.80
Total valid votes		87,163		
Registered electors		130,313		▲10.39
IC(S) gain from INC(I)		Swing	▲8.73	

=== Assembly Election 1980 ===
1980 Maharashtra Legislative Assembly election : Paranda
Party	Candidate	Votes	%	±%
INC(I)	Chandansingh Baban Singh Saddiwal	25,950	36.88%	New
INC(U)	Shinde Sadashiv Yashwantrao	21,539	30.61%	New
JP	Deshmukh Vasudeo Anandrao	20,769	29.51%	New
Independent	Nikalje Arjun Trimbak	1,336	1.90%	New
Independent	Baban Pandurang Rambhau	777	1.10%	New
Margin of victory		4,411	6.27%	▲3.96
Turnout		72,505	61.42%	▼0.97
Total valid votes		70,371		
Registered electors		118,043		▲7.94
INC(I) gain from JP		Swing	▲2.05	

=== Assembly Election 1978 ===
1978 Maharashtra Legislative Assembly election : Paranda
Party	Candidate	Votes	%	±%
JP	Deshmukh Vasudeo Anandrao	22,947	34.83%	New
INC	Patil Subrao Mohanrao	21,428	32.52%	▲0.35
PWPI	Dhage Vasantrao Sahebrao	17,443	26.48%	▲1.85
Independent	Bansode Maruti Shankar	4,064	6.17%	New
Margin of victory		1,519	2.31%	▼1.87
Turnout		68,237	62.39%	▲0.42
Total valid votes		65,882		
Registered electors		109,363		▲5.52
JP gain from RPI		Swing	▼1.52	

=== Assembly Election 1972 ===
1972 Maharashtra Legislative Assembly election : Paranda
Party	Candidate	Votes	%	±%
RPI	Deshmukh Vasudeo Anandrao	22,341	36.35%	New
INC	Arunojirao Deshmukh	19,771	32.17%	▼14.28
PWPI	Patil Udhavrao Sahebrao	15,138	24.63%	▼17.67
Independent	Borade Sopan Nirwarti	2,205	3.59%	New
Independent	Andhare Parsu Rangnath	2,010	3.27%	New
Margin of victory		2,570	4.18%	▲0.02
Turnout		64,222	61.97%	▲2.11
Total valid votes		61,465		
Registered electors		103,640		▲10.76
RPI gain from INC		Swing	▼10.10	

=== Assembly Election 1967 ===
1967 Maharashtra Legislative Assembly election : Paranda
Party	Candidate	Votes	%	±%
INC	K. H. Patil	23,396	46.45%	▲9.13
PWPI	B. N. Deshmukh	21,303	42.30%	▼0.01
Independent	M. S. Bansode	3,841	7.63%	New
ABJS	Y. R. Mahajan	1,823	3.62%	New
Margin of victory		2,093	4.16%	▼0.83
Turnout		56,006	59.86%	▲5.82
Total valid votes		50,363		
Registered electors		93,568		▲22.92
INC gain from PWPI		Swing	▲4.14	

=== Assembly Election 1962 ===
1962 Maharashtra Legislative Assembly election : Paranda
Party	Candidate	Votes	%	±%
PWPI	Krishnaji Bajirao	16,085	42.31%	▼24.34
INC	Tarabai Mansinghrao	14,188	37.32%	▲10.61
Independent	Vasudeo Anandrao	7,748	20.38%	New
Margin of victory		1,897	4.99%	▼34.95
Turnout		41,131	54.04%	▲15.00
Total valid votes		38,021		
Registered electors		76,118		▲20.12
PWPI hold		Swing	▼24.34	

=== Assembly Election 1952 ===
1952 Hyderabad State Legislative Assembly election : Paranda
Party	Candidate	Votes	%	±%
PWPI	Vishwas Rao	16,487	66.65%	New
INC	Maqabul Ahmed	6,608	26.71%	New
Independent	Rangnathrao Saheb	1,641	6.63%	New
Margin of victory		9,879	39.94%	
Turnout		24,736	39.04%	
Total valid votes		24,736		
Registered electors		63,366		
PWPI win (new seat)				

== See also ==
- Constituencies of the Maharashtra Vidhan Sabha
- Paranda
