= Paranda (hair ornament) =

Hair accessory worn by women in Punjab

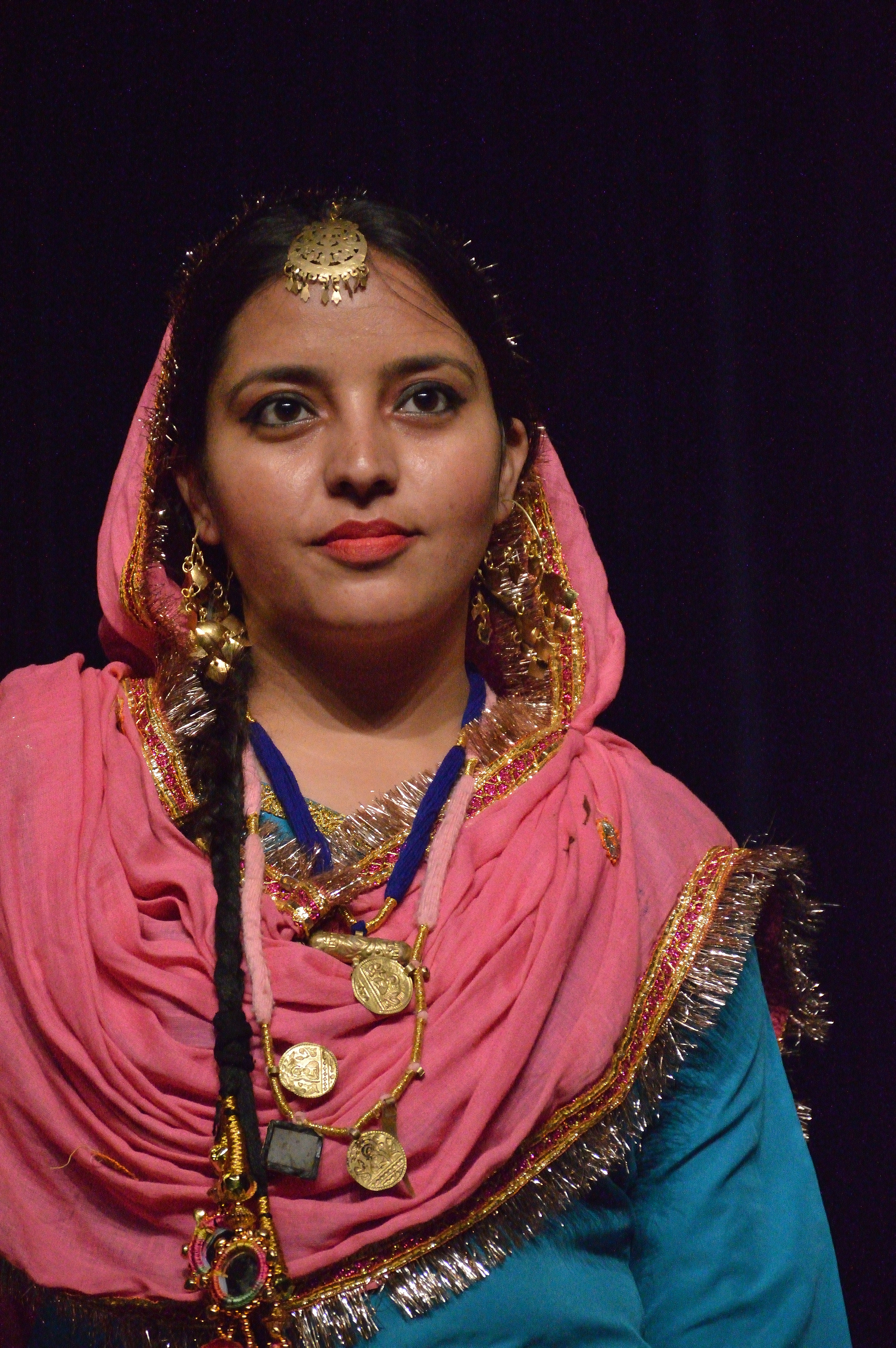
Punjabi girl wearing Paranda in her hair

A Punjabi paranda, also known as a parandi, is a women's hair ornament made of multicolored silk thread and decorated with floral (bunches) designs and ornamental tassels. The Paranda is a part of traditional ethnic Punjabi clothing and a folk accessory of Punjabi culture. Patiala is famous for its salwars and parandas

== Material ==
Parandas are made by interweaving silk threads of different contrast colors. The practice of making parandas was started by women in Punjab, who began making them as a hobby, art, and craft.

== Style ==
The paranda is braided into the hair, with ornate tassels usually hanging from the end of the braid. It is often made to match the clothing of the wearer, and is worn commonly during performances of folk dances such as the Giddha. Young girls and women may adorn themselves with it on special occasions like marriages and folk festivals such as Lohri, Vaisakhi, Teej, etc. However, the paranda is worn less frequently in modern day.

== See also ==
- Jutti
- Phulkari

== Gallery ==
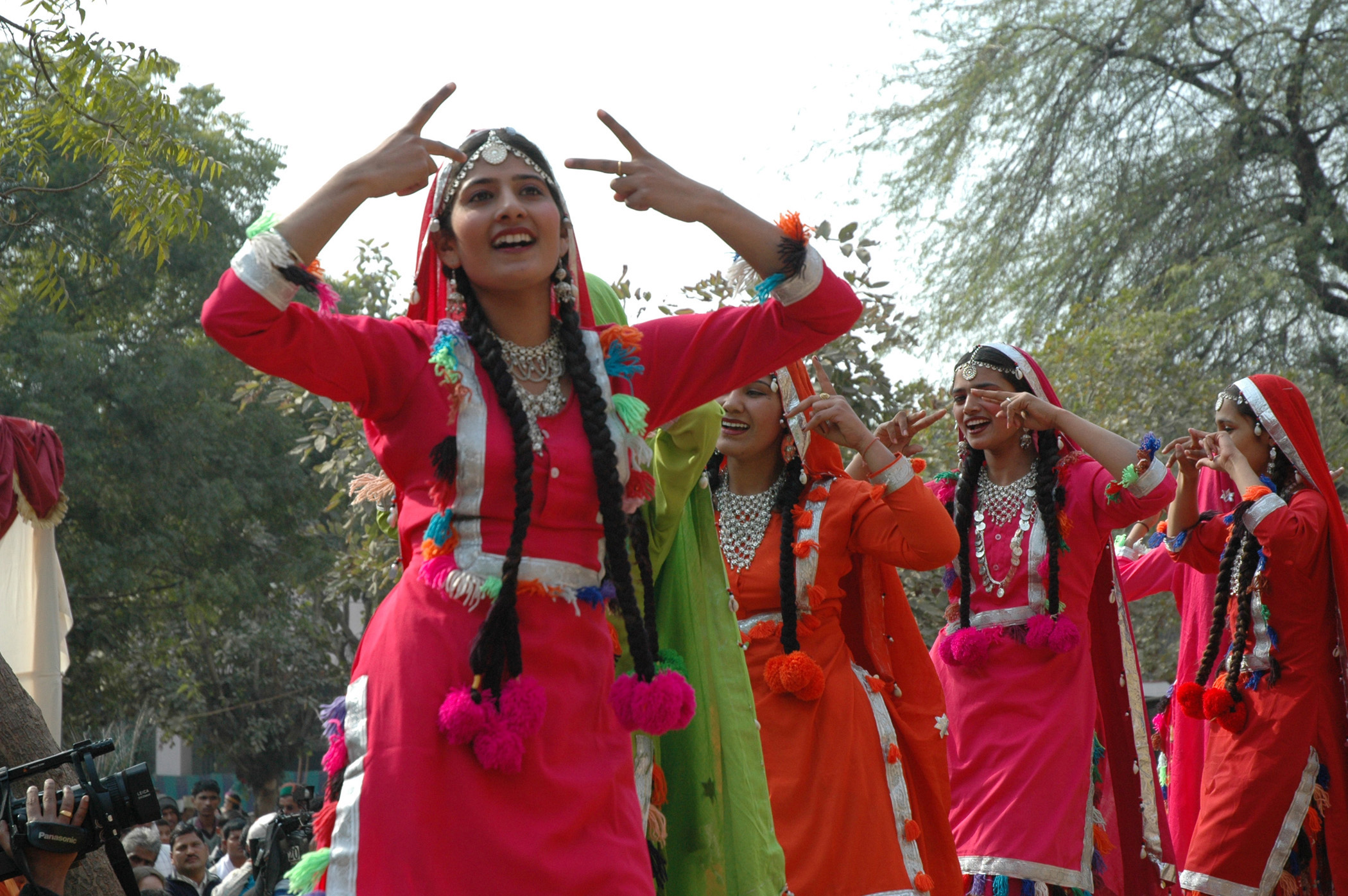
Folk dancers from Punjab performing at six-day Folk Dance Festival ‘Lok Tarang, in New Delhi on January 19, 2007

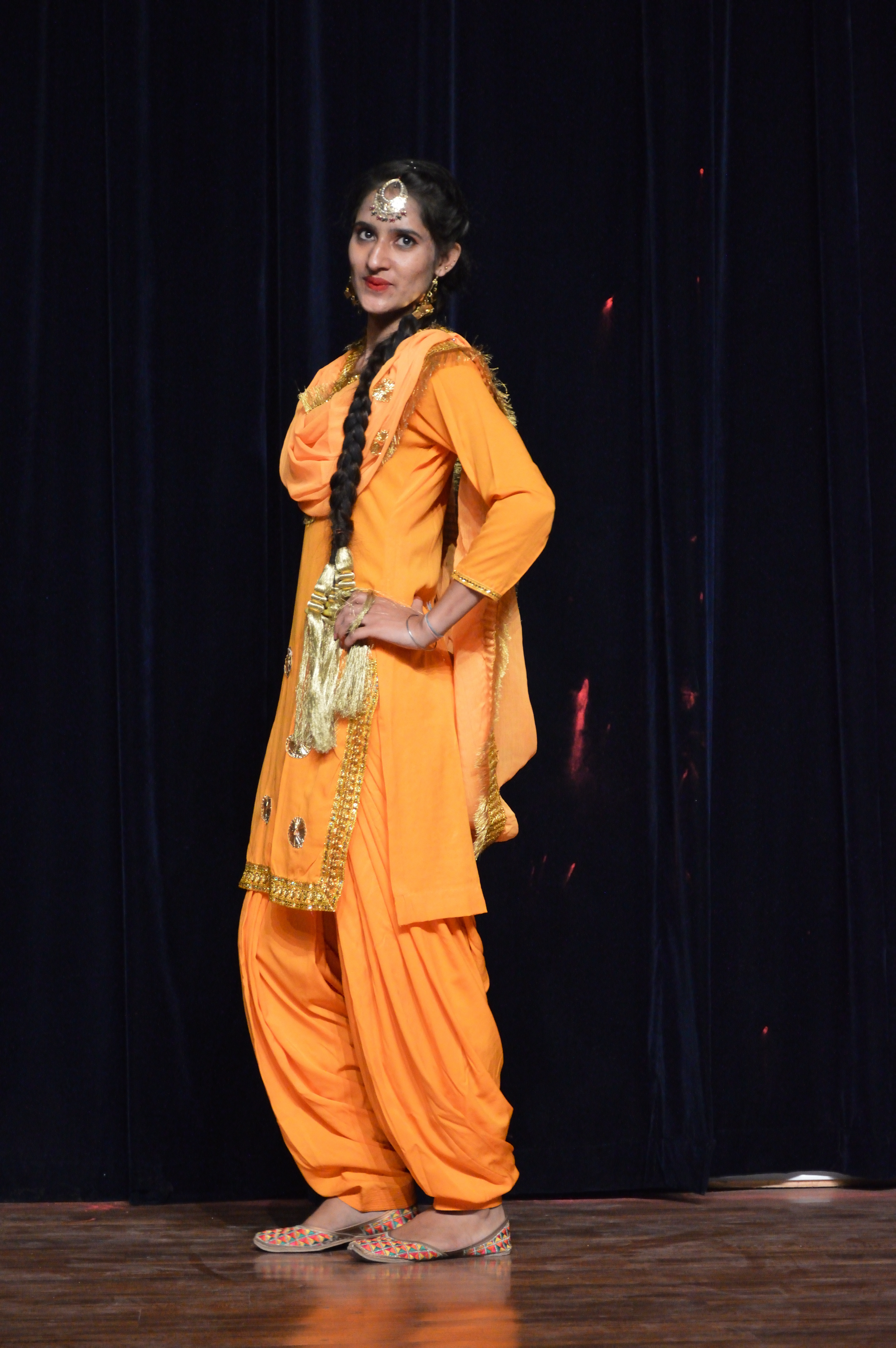
Punjabi girl wearing a Paranda with tassels
