= Paranda =

- Town
- Location in Maharashtra, India
- Coordinates: 18°16′12″N 75°27′12″E
- Country: India
- State: Maharashtra
- District: Dharashiv
- Tahsil: Paranda

Area
  - Total: 19 km^{2} (7.3 sq mi)

Population (2011)
  - Total: 16,879
  - Density: 1,258/km^{2} (3,260/sq mi)

Languages
  - Official: Marathi
- Time zone: UTC+5:30 (IST)
- PIN: 413502
- Telephone code: 2477
- Vehicle registration: MH25
- Lok Sabha constituency: Dharashiv
- Vidhan Sabha constituency: Paranda

Paranda is a town with a municipal council in the Dharashiv district of the Indian state of Maharashtra. It is the headquarters town for the Paranda Tehsil.

== History ==
The city is located around an ancient Paranda Fort and is also an area of mosques and temples. Paranda, historically known as Parinda, was the capital for nearly four thousand villages. Today, there are ninety-seven villages in the Paranda taluka (subdistrict). The Paranda municipal council was founded in the year 1941 and is the oldest municipal council in the Osmanabad district. The river Sina is a source of fine quality sand.

== Origin of local names ==
According to tradition, there once lived a demon (rakshas in Sanskrit and Marathi) named Prachandasur (a huge giant) who ruled the area with his brother demons Suvarnasur, Bhuamasur, and Kandasur, hence the place names for the nearby villages in which they lived (Sonari, Bhoom and Kandari, respectively). The Lord of Destruction, Kal Bhairav, killed all these demons.

== Demographics ==
According to India's 2001 census, Paranda had a population of 16,987, of whom 52% were male, 48% female, and 14% under the age of six. The average literacy rate in Paranda was 64%, higher than the national average of 59.5%. The literacy rate was 72% for males and 57% for females. In the 2011 census, the population of Paranda increased to 18,758.

== Transportation ==
Rail: The nearest railway station is Kurduwadi Junction on the Mumbai-Chennai route, 22 kilometres from Paranda. Barshi, on the Kurduwadi-Latur route of the Central Railway, is another station near Paranda. The distance between Barshi and Paranda is 30 kilometres.

Road: Paranda, Barshi, Kurduwadi, and Karmalais are connected by state highways. State transport bus services are available to Paranda from Barshi, Kurduwadi, Osmanabad, Nanded, Latur, Pune, and Pimpri-Chinchwad. The Maharashtra State Transport Corporation operates bus services to Paranda from Mumbai and Pune.

Air: Solapur, Osmanabad, Latur which is far away.

== Local landmarks ==
Paranda Fort: There is a large fort over 1000 years old in the town, surrounded by a trench. The fort which never saw battle and was used as a munitions depot. Even today, one can see remnants of weapons lying about. Sadly, this site of great antiquity has not been maintained and the trench is overgrown with weeds. Today there is a mosque inside the fort.

Dargah of Sufi Saint Khwaja Badruddin Chisti Shaheed: is a famous dargah (Sufi shrine) at the grave of Sufi saint Khwaja Badruddin Chisti Shaheed. It is roughly 800 years old and lies in a large kabristan (cemetery) in Paranda. Near the dargah are also tombs of the saint's disciples and companions. Each year a grand celebration called the Urs Mubarak (death anniversary of the Blessed One) takes place in the 8th rajab of the Islamic calendar to mark the anniversary of the saint's death. Throngs of people from all across Maharashtra, representing all religions, take part in the celebration. This dargah is a unique place of Muslim-Hindu unity. At the other end of the city there is a dargah of another Sufi saint, Khwaja Khaas Khalil.

Bhairavnath Nath Mandir

- Marathi and Hindi actor.

- Maharshi Guruvarya R. G. Shinde - Socialist and Educationalist, ShikshanMaharshi

== Educational Institutions ==
Paranda is enriched with educational facilities for local people. Following educational institutions are providing educational facilities;

- Shikshan Maharshi Guruvarya R.G. Shinde Mahavidyalaya, Paranda, established in the year 1986.
- Sant Gadagebaba Mahavidyalaya, Paranda established in 1970.
- Mahatma Gandhi Vidyalaya, Paranda established in 1983

== See also ==
- Paranda (Vidhan Sabha constituency)
