= George V. Mann =

American medical researcher and physician

- Born: September 15, 1917; Fort Dodge, Iowa
- Died: July 17, 2013 (aged 95); McMinnville, Tennessee
- Occupations: Medical researcher, physician, academic, and author

Academic background
- Education: D.Sc., Biochemistry; M.D.
- Alma mater: Cornell College; Johns Hopkins University

George V. Mann was an American medical researcher, physician, academic, and author known for his research on cholesterol's impact on cardiovascular health. He served as an assistant professor at Harvard University early in his career and as a professor and researcher of medicine and biochemistry at Vanderbilt University until his retirement.

Mann's authored works encompass over 200 articles published in medical journals, including the New England Journal of Medicine and the American Journal of Epidemiology, along with books for the general public that include The Care and Feeding of Athletes and Coronary Heart Disease: The Dietary Sense and Nonsense.

== Early life and education ==
Mann was born in 1917 in Fort Dodge, a town in north-central Iowa, and grew up on various farms in the region where his father worked as a sharecropper. He graduated in 1939 with a BS degree in chemistry from Cornell College in Mount Vernon, Iowa. Subsequently, he earned a Doctor of Science degree in biochemistry and an MD from Johns Hopkins School of Medicine in 1945.

== Career ==
Mann started his medical career at the Osler Service of Johns Hopkins University between 1945 and 1946. He then completed his residency at Peter Bent Brigham Hospital in Boston from 1946 to 1947 and spent a year working with the Joslin Diabetes Service at New England Deaconess Hospital also in Boston. In 1949, he was appointed Assistant Professor of Nutrition at Harvard University and served as an Investigator for the American Heart Association. In 1955, he was appointed associate director of the Framingham Heart Study, an ongoing cardiovascular study on 5209 residents of the town of Framingham, Massachusetts that began in 1948, was led from 1949 to 1966 by Thomas Dawber and continues as of 2025. In 1958, he became Professor of Medicine and Biochemistry at Vanderbilt University where he held a Career Investigator appointment with the National Institutes of Health until his retirement from Vanderbilt in 1987.

== Research ==
In response to the perceived epidemic of coronary heart disease, in 1957, Ancel Keys, a physiology professor at the University of Minnesota, proposed the "lipid hypothesis", also known as the "diet-heart hypothesis," suggesting a causal link between saturated fat intake and coronary heart disease risk. Keys' formulated the lipid hypothesis during his post-WWII travels in Italy, Sardinia, and Spain, where he observed that less wealthy individuals with lower saturated fat diets from meat and dairy experienced fewer heart attacks. For the next three decades, Mann became a leading critic of the lipid hypothesis who clashed with both Keys and Key's mentee and successor in his research group at the University of Minnesota, Henry Blackburn–as Mann and others in the lab-based biomedical research community could not find any direct evidence from their lab-based studies for the link between diet and heart disease.

In 1957, Ancel Keys launched the Seven Countries Study, tracking 12,770 men across 16 locations in the US, Europe, and Japan to test the lipid hypothesis. Critics argued that the selected countries reflected his preferred diets and excluded nations like France and Germany, where high milk and meat consumption coincided with low coronary heart disease rates. Within the same year, in response, Yerushalmy and Hilleboe analyzed data from 22 countries worldwide and found no significant link between dietary fat and coronary heart disease.

The first in a series of disagreements over the origin of cardiovascular disease that would span both of the lengthy careers of Keys and Mann occurred from 1955 until 1956, when Mann—then an assistant professor of nutrition at the Harvard School of Public Health—published an article entitled "Lack of Effect of a High Fat Intake on Serum Lipid Levels." In the article, based on feeding two human subjects a high-saturated-fat diet and measuring their cholesterol levels, Mann found no link between increased fat intake and elevated blood cholesterol. In 1956, Keys responded with a critique of Mann's small sample size, his misuse of statistics, and his interpretation, which Keys re-cast as more supportive of his lipid hypothesis. He concluded that Mann's paper was "an interesting case of statistical fallacy applied to inadequate evidence."

In 1957, public support for the lipid hypothesis increased as Keys informed the personal physician of then-President Eisenhower that saturated fat in the president's diet might have contributed to his heart attacks. However, the growing number of epidemiological studies, including the Seven Countries study, remained observational and failed to establish a cause-and-effect relationship between high saturated fat intake and increased cardiovascular disease.

Mann, in his role as associate director of the Framingham Heart Program from 1955 until 1959, analyzed the links between diets and cardiovascular disease, and by 1960 had concluded that saturated fat was not an overt cause of heart disease based on their survey group, although these results remained obscure until years after the study was completed. Mann concluded that "epidemiology is apt not to be a decisive method for resolution of these problems. At best, the method may supply a few clues and enough encouragement to gifted people who will find the answer in the laboratory." Decades later in 1992, William P. Castelli who led the Framingham project from 1979 to 1995 observed that the more saturated fat the survey group ate, the lower their serum cholesterol became.

Despite these criticisms of his lipid hypothesis, Keys was undeterred and responded by writing several books for the public that espoused low-fat diets. In recognition of these popular books, Time magazine featured Keys, referred to as "Mr. Cholesterol," as the cover subject for their January 13, 1961, issue. By 1961, the American Heart Association concluded that it accepted the lipid hypothesis and suggested that the public replace saturated fats with polyunsaturated vegetable oils as protection against heart disease.

During the late 1950s, Mann expanded his research from lab-based cholesterol analyses in animals to field-based, epidemiological studies involving a statistically significant number of human subjects from Indigenous groups with high-saturated fat diets. These groups included populations in the US and Central America, the Pygmies of central Africa, the Eskimos of northern Alaska, and the Maasai of east Africa. Despite consuming high-cholesterol diets that included whale blubber, beef, wild game, cow's blood, and very high-fat cow's milk, all these diverse and widely separated groups exhibited low blood cholesterol levels. Mann interpreted this as evidence against the lipid-heart hypothesis, instead proposing the exercise-heart hypothesis, which suggested that their high physical fitness protected all of these groups from heart disease.

Keys countered Mann's conclusions on the low cholesterol levels of the Masai with three alternative explanations: previous studies had identified other nomadic Kenyan tribes who subsisted on large amounts of very high-fat camel's milk and, unlike the Masai, exhibited high cholesterol levels; the low rate of heart disease in the Masai reflected their state of being "chronically underfed and frequently half-starved"; and Mann's proposal that sour milk in the Masai's diet acted to keep blood cholesterol levels low was, in fact, an affirmation of Keys' lipid hypothesis linking diet and cholesterol levels.

Following the conclusion of his work with the Masai in the late 1960s, Mann's research focused on developing the exercise-heart hypothesis as a major control on cholesterol levels and coronary heart disease. Using groups of volunteer human subjects, including local firemen in the Nashville area, he developed programs for exercise over weeks to months that monitored the effects of exercise on their cholesterol levels and cardiovascular health. He showed that as little as thirty minutes of vigorous exercise per week could be beneficial, leading to further trials, and by 1977, he concluded that exercise was more essential than diet in heart disease prevention. Based on these studies, he published an exercise guide in 1970 entitled Over 30: An Exercise Program for Adults, which provided calisthenics-based routines designed to promote fitness, flexibility, and overall health maintenance. Laurence M. Hursh commented, "It is by far the best guide I have ever seen. If you are over 30, have a medical checkup and get Dr. Mann's book". During this period, he was an invited technical observer to the 1976 summer Olympics in Montreal, Canada, and in 1980 published a book: The Care and Feeding of Athletes.

By 1977, Mann established his role as the chief critic of the lipid hypothesis through two events: first, the publication of his review article in the New England Journal of Medicine, titled "Diet-Heart: End of an Era," which summarized three decades of research and controversy over the hypothesis; and second, his profile in People Magazine, titled "Dr. George Mann Says Low Cholesterol Diets are Useless, the ‘Heart Mafia’ Disagrees." In his review article, he recounted observations from decades of lab-based and epidemiological studies. Based on this review of the data, he concluded that the diet-heart or lipid hypothesis remained an unproven hypothesis that was not supported by scientific observations. The journal published a full-length rebuttal by the panel of the American Health Association advisory group that was charged with developing dietary guidelines that espoused the lipid hypothesis.

Olszewski in 2014 highlighted the discussions surrounding the lipid hypothesis, which explored the role of epidemiology in clinical medicine. Advocates of epidemiology embraced it as a powerful tool for answering complex questions, while critics like Mann viewed epidemiology as an imperfect science that could not definitively explain human biology. The debate became irrelevant as US policymakers had already adopted the lipid hypothesis starting in the early 1960s. During his retirement years, Mann persisted in his criticism of the lipid hypothesis with a book for the public that summarized all of his observations on diet and health entitled: Coronary Heart Disease: The Dietary Sense and Nonsense. Julian Tudor Hart commended the book's critique of the diet-heart hypothesis, calling it an essential resource on coronary health.

In the years between Mann's retirement in 1987 and death in 2013, criticism of the lipid hypothesis passed to journalists starting with Gary Taubes who published an article in the journal Science and an article in the New York Times that compiled the arguments by Mann and others on why saturated fats were not detrimental to cardiac health. Journalist and nutritionist Nina Teicholz continued this discussion in her 2014 book that questioned the emphasis on avoiding saturated fat and referred to the work of Mann and other researchers on this topic. Detailed accounts of the career of Mann, his impact on diet research, and his multi-decadal debates with Keys and other advocates of the lipid hypothesis were published in academic journals by Olszewski, J. Elliott (2014), and Teicholz.

== Personal life ==
Mann was married to Jean Ebersbach Mann from 1946 until her death in 1994. She was a nursing graduate from Johns Hopkins School of Nursing in 1943 and became the Director of Nursing at Nashville General Hospital during the 1970s and early 1980s. He is survived by five children and four grandchildren.

== Bibliography ==
=== Books ===
- Over 30: An Exercise Program for Adults (1970) ISBN 9780876950098
- The Care and Feeding of Athletes (1980) ISBN 9780937716007
- Coronary Heart Disease: The Dietary Sense and Nonsense (1993) ISBN 9781857560725

=== Selected articles ===
==== Nutrition and trans-fatty acids' impact ====
- Mann, G. V., Geyer, R. P., Watkin, D. M., & Stare, F. J. (1949). Parenteral nutrition. 9 Fat emulsions for intravenous nutrition in man. Journal of Laboratory and Clinical Medicine, 34:699.
- Mann, G. V., & Stare, F. J. (1950). Nutritional needs in illness and disease. Journal of the American Medical Association, 142(6), 409–419.
- Mann, G. V. (1994). Metabolic consequences of dietary trans-fatty acids. The Lancet, 343(8908), 1268–1271.

==== Framingham long-term study ====
- Mann, G. V. (1957). The epidemiology of coronary heart disease. The American Journal of Medicine, 23(3), 463–480.
- Mann, G. V., Pearson, G., Gordon, T., & Dawber, T. R. (1962). Diet and cardiovascular disease in the Framingham study. I. Measurement of dietary intake. The American journal of clinical nutrition, 11, 200–225.
- Dawber, T. R., Moore, F. E., & Mann, G. V. (2015). II. Coronary heart disease in the Framingham study. International Journal of Epidemiology, 44(6), 1767–1780.

==== Lipid hypothesis: diet, weight, and stress studies ====
- Mann, G. V. (1954). The interpretation of serum lipoprotein measurements. Bulletin. New England Medical Center Hospital, 16(4), 152–158.
- Mann, G. V. (1955). Lack of effect of a high fat intake on serum lipid levels. The American Journal of Clinical Nutrition, 3(3), 230–233.

==== Lipid hypothesis: field studies on indigenous groups ====
- Mann, G.V., Munoz, J.A., and Scrimshaw, N.S., 1955, The serum lipoprotein and cholesterol concentrations of Central and North Americans with different dietary habits: The American Journal of Medicine: 19(1), 25–32.
- Mann, G. V., Roels, O. A., Price, D. L., & Merrill, J. M. (1962). Cardiovascular disease in African Pygmies: a survey of the health status, serum lipids and diet of Pygmies in Congo. Journal of Chronic Diseases, 15(4), 341–371.
- Mann, G. V., Scott, E. M., Hursh, L. M., Heller, C. A., Youmans, J. B., Consolazio, C. F., ... & Murphy, R. J. (1962). The health and nutritional status of Alaskan Eskimos: A survey of the Interdepartmental Committee on Nutrition for National Defense—1958. The American journal of Clinical Nutrition, 11(1), 31–76.
- Mann, G. V., Shaffer, R. D., Anderson, R. S., Sandstead, H. H., Prendergast, H., Mann, J. C., ... & Dicks, K. (1964). Cardiovascular disease in the Masai. Journal of Atherosclerosis Research, 4(4), 289–312.
- Mann, G. V., Spoerry, A., Gary, M., & Jarashow, D. (1972). Atherosclerosis in the Masai. American journal of Epidemiology, 95(1), 26–37.

==== Lipid or diet-heart hypothesis ====
- Mann, G. V. (1949). Dietary aspects of cholesterol metabolism and disease. Journal of the American Dietetic Association, 25(5), 389–391.
- Mann, G. V., Teel, K., Hayes, O., McNally, A., & Bruno, D. (1955). Exercise in the disposition of dietary calories: regulation of serum lipoprotein and cholesterol levels in human subjects. New England Journal of Medicine, 253(9), 349–355.
- Mann, G. V. (1974). The influence of obesity on health. New England Journal of Medicine, 291(4), 178–185.
