= Robert DuBroff =

American cardiologist

Robert J. DuBroff is an American cardiologist who works in Albuquerque, New Mexico. He has challenged the lipid hypothesis and has disputed the efficiency of statin therapy. Dubroff also disputes the current saturated fat guidelines.

DuBroff obtained his medical degree from the Pritzker School of Medicine. He taught at the University of New Mexico. He has argued that evidence supporting statins has not been validated. In 2016, he co-authored a review paper with Aseem Malhotra which cast doubt on the efficacy of cholesterol-lowering therapies on cardiovascular events. The review was criticized for making a "flawed analysis of published data".

DuBroff has stated that cholesterol is only a partial picture of heart disease and other factors may be responsible such as inflammation and insulin resistance.

== See also ==
- Maryanne Demasi
