= Maryanne Demasi =

Australian investigative journalist

- Occupations: Journalist, presenter

Maryanne Demasi is an Australian investigative journalist and presenter best known for her work with the Australian Broadcasting Corporation (ABC) Catalyst television program. In 2013 Demasi presented a report for Catalyst that challenged the scientific consensus on cholesterol, saturated fat and statins. She argued that high-blood cholesterol and high saturated fat consumption do not cause or increase risk of cardiovascular disease and that cholesterol-reducing drugs such as statins are ineffective. These claims were criticized by medical experts as dangerous and misleading.

Demasi became nationally prominent for television stories that resulted in controversy, contributing to rumours in 2017 of the axing of Catalyst followed by an announcement of its planned restructuring and possible redeployment of staff.

== Background ==
Demasi completed a doctorate in rheumatology at the University of Adelaide and worked for a decade at the Royal Adelaide Hospital as a research scientist. She also worked as an advisor to the South Australian Government's Minister for Science and Information Economy.

In 2003, Demasi co-authored a paper in the Journal of Biological Chemistry, on the "Effects of hypoxia on monocyte inflammatory mediator production" which was based on her PhD dissertation for the University of Adelaide. In 2017, an expression of concern was published to "inform readers that credible concerns have been raised regarding some of the data and conclusions". The paper was retracted in 2018 after an investigation by the Journal determined that data had been duplicated. An administrative tribunal hearing on the matter, conducted by the University of Adelaide, did not substantiate the allegations. "In response to three allegations, the 'duplication' represented the 'baseline' value for time course experiments and they were intended to indicate there is only one baseline for both the normoxia and hypoxia treatments. The expert witnesses at the hearing, and the panel agreed this was acceptable practice at the time, circa 2002, and did not constitute a breach in any code." The panel ruled that it could not substantiate any of the allegations made by the complainant.

In 2017 Demasi wrote an opinion piece advocating low-carbohydrate diets. In 2017, Demasi wrote an article with Robert H. Lustig and Aseem Malhotra arguing that the cholesterol hypothesis is "dead". In 2021, Demasi co-authored a paper with Robert DuBroff challenging statin therapy. As of 2022, Demasi is a writer for the Brownstone Institute, an organization that has been criticized by medical experts for spreading misinformation against vaccines.

== Catalyst controversies ==
=== Statin report ===
Demasi produced and presented two controversial episodes on the science program Catalyst, called "The Heart of the Matter", in October 2013, which questioned the link between cholesterol, cholesterol-reducing medication and ill-health. A large number of individuals and professional organisations within the medical community responded to the show negatively, stating that its claims were misleading and ignored the scientific consensus. The National Heart Foundation of Australia published an eight-page rebuttal of the claims presented in the program.

Demasi was accused of bias by ABC's MediaWatch program and received criticism from health specialists for incomplete and biased coverage of life-threatening health issues. In response to these allegations, Demasi said that participants in the program had been presented with her material and agreed with her interpretation. The National Heart Foundation responded, saying that Demasi had not presented the research, ignored and misinterpreted the information provided and selectively edited quotes to invert their meaning. In May 2014 the ABC removed the two episodes from its website. after an internal review found that both programs met the ABC editorial standards for factual accuracy, though a section in the second episode breached standards of impartiality. The report also found that the programs were not found to cause any undue harm to the public and took adequate steps to ensure people did not cease their medications without consulting their doctor. Despite the finding of the ABC's report, the Medical Journal of Australia (MJA) claimed that there was a temporary increase in discontinuation of statins and a sustained decrease in the dispensing of statins immediately following the broadcast of the program.

=== "Wi-Fried" episode ===
Demasi produced a report in a February 2016 episode of Catalyst called "Wi-Fried" on Wi-Fi and cellphone safety. In her report she detailed the scientific debate about health effects from low level exposures and she raised questions about the long term effects of low level microwave exposures in schools. Her report shows a school where the Wi-Fi routers are turned off when not in use to reduce microwave radiation exposure. Her report was described as unbalanced by Media Watch, criticised by the Australian Radiation Protection and Nuclear Safety Agency (ARPANSA) and in the media by groups and scientists who have long believed it is impossible for microwave radiation to have effects at low levels. Demasi defended her report in an article in The Guardian and responded to specific criticism in the Huffington Post. Catalyst also defended the episode in a letter to Media Watch. Demasi was stood down as a reporter and the program was placed under review. A public on-air apology statement was broadcast on the ABC on 5 July 2016, and the episode was withdrawn from the ABC's website.

== Awards ==
Demasi has been awarded National Press Club of Australia prizes in 2008, 2009 and 2011 for "Excellence in Health Journalism". In 2014 she was a finalist in the Association of International Broadcasting Awards for her Catalyst episode "Toxic Sugar", subsequently won by David Attenborough.
