= Copenhagen General Population Study =

Population-based health survey in Denmark

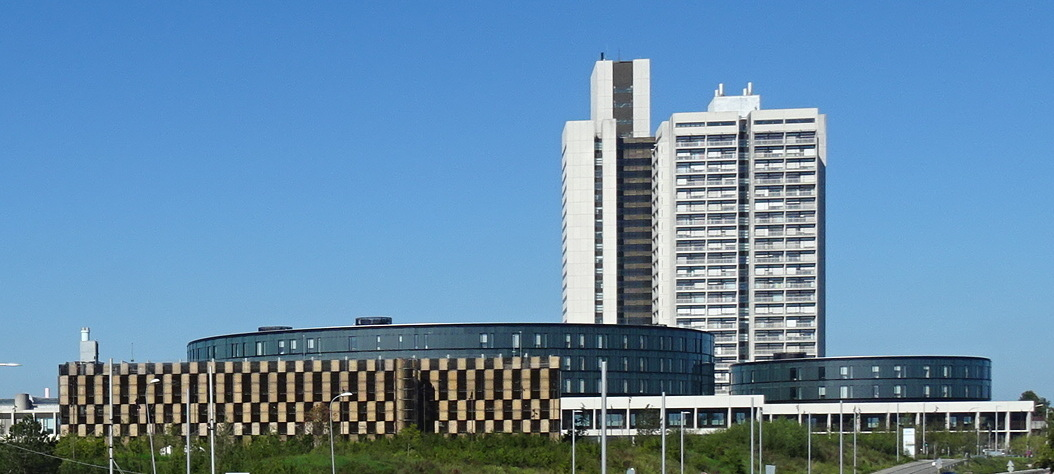
Herlev Hospital (2023), where the population survey takes place and is headquartered.

The Copenhagen General Population Study (CGPS; Danish: Herlev/Østerbroundersøgelsen) is an ongoing Danish longitudinal cohort study, that investigates the epidemiology of a wide range of diseases, in particular cardiovascular disease, respiratory disease, cancer, infections and other multifactorial diseases, in a representative sample of the Danish population. Headquartered at the Department of Clinical Biochemistry at Herlev Hospital, it was established in 2003 with professor Børge Nordestgaard as principal investigator, and it is the world's largest population study that follows the long-term health development of a healthy population over time, currently collecting data on over 170,000 enrolled participants.

Expanding upon the earlier and less extensive sister study, the Copenhagen City Heart Study (CCHS; Danish: Østerbroundersøgelsen), the population survey has been conducted in several phases since 1976, incipiently involving a representative sample of people in the Østerbro neighbourhood of Copenhagen. In 2003, the CGPS was established to expand the study to cover an increasingly large area in the Copenhagen metropolitan area. A second phase is currently in progress for the study, whereas a sixth is underway under the auspices of CCHS. All participants are recalled for follow-up examinations, and are followed in the Danish Civil Registration System and medical records. The survey includes a comprehensive physical examination, preceded by a questionnaire on lifestyle factors. The examination covers heart and lung function, measurements of height, weight, blood pressure, ankle-brachial pressure index, extensive blood sample analysis and other clinical examinations.

Since 1976, the study and its precursor have produced over 1,330 scientific articles in the medical press, including significant research in general and genetic epidemiology. Notable findings include the positive impact of regular physical activity on lifespan, the health benefits of moderate red wine consumption, and the role of triglycerides and genetic predisposition in developing various diseases.

As of 2023, 27 doctoral theses and 96 PhD dissertations have been based on the study's data, with around 20 PhD students and hundreds of other researchers currently working with the data.

== History ==
=== Precursor ===
The Copenhagen General Population Study is an offshoot of the Copenhagen City Heart Study (CCHS), known in Danish as Østerbroundersøgelsen. The CCHS was launched in 1976 by Professor Anders Tybjærg Hansen and cardiologists Dr. Peter Schnohr, Dr. Gorm Jensen and statistician Jørgen Nyboe, and began as a large cardiovascular-focused study.

The study was launched in response to a sharp post World War II increase in mortality from acute myocardial infarction (AMI) in Denmark, particularly in the capital region. From the 1950s onwards, cardiovascular disease emerged as a leading cause of death, yet knowledge about its causes and risk factors remained limited. Inspired by large-scale epidemiological initiatives such as the Framingham Heart Study (US), the Seven Countries Study (Keys), and the Whitehall Study (UK), Danish Professor Tybjærg Hansen initiated the national cohort study. It incipiently received funding from the Danish Heart Foundation and support from municipal health authorities.

Although designed with a large emphasis on cardiovascular disease, specifically coronary heart disease, hypertension and stroke, it quickly expanded to include a wide array of health conditions, such as pulmonary diseases, heart failure, arrhythmia, dementia, and various genetic and psychosocial factors. The initial study population of the Copenhagen City Heart Study consisted of a random sample of nearly 20,000 men and women, aged 20 to 93, selected from approximately 90,000 residents aged 20 and older in ten wards around Rigshospitalet in Copenhagen, encompassing all of Østerbro and one-third of Nørrebro, districts of Copenhagen Municipality.

=== Establishment of the study ===
The Copenhagen General Population Study (CGPS) was established on 26 November 2003 at Herlev Hospital under the leadership of Professor Børge Nordestgaard. Designed as an expansion of this precursor study, it broadened the scope to include a larger and more diverse cohort from the Copenhagen metropolitan area. Initially, the study recruited over 100,000 participants aged 20 to 100, who contributed through questionnaires, biological samples, and physical examinations. In 2010, ethical approval enabled the integration of cardiac CT imaging, providing insights into cardiovascular biomarkers. The cohort has since expanded to include over 170,000 enrolled participants.

A key feature of the CGPS and its predecessor studies is the integration with Denmark’s comprehensive national registries. These registries provide detailed and updated information on participants, including hospital discharge diagnoses, cancer records, causes of death, prescription use, and demographic data such as education and income. This infrastructure ensures nearly 100% follow-up, eliminating a common source of bias in longitudinal studies. The registries also enable cost-effective management of large cohorts and allow disease-free participants to serve as controls for case-control studies.

== Scientific impact and findings ==
=== Scientific findings ===
Numerous highly cited scientific articles have been published on the results of the studies, for example that 65–79 year olds who start exercising about 4 hours a week will increase their lifespan by an average of 4 years.

One highly publicized result showed that moderate red wine consumption was associated with a significantly reduced risk of myocardial infarction and lower all-cause mortality. The finding was cited by U.S. President Bill Clinton and featured on CBS’s 60 Minutes, sparking global interest.

Other findings from the studies include the clinical implication of elevated triglyceride levels for the development of cardiovascular disease and the importance of genetic predisposition for the development of cardiovascular disease, lung disease and cancer, among others.

For example, in cardiovascular health, its findings established that elevated nonfasting triglyceride levels correlate with a heightened risk of myocardial infarction, ischaemic heart disease, and mortality in both men and women. Additionally, the study revealed nuanced effects of alcohol consumption on blood pressure, showing that different types of alcoholic beverages may influence blood pressure differently.

In the field of genetic research, CGPS researchers has employed Mendelian randomization to uncover the causal links between long-term alcohol consumption and coronary heart disease risk factors. In respiratory health, CGPS provided pivotal data on early identification of chronic obstructive pulmonary disease (COPD), emphasizing the roles of age and smoking exposure in disease progression and associated risks.

The study's findings in metabolic health revealed that increased triglyceride metabolism, characterized by elevated levels of plasma glycerol and β-hydroxybutyrate, is strongly linked to higher risks of all-cause mortality, including deaths from cardiovascular diseases and cancer. These discoveries underscore the CGPS's broad impact on understanding the interplay of lifestyle, genetics, and metabolic factors in health outcomes.

== See also ==
- Original publications, 2007-2020.
- Other publications, 2007-2020.
- Theses 2007-2020.
