= Aseem Malhotra =

British cardiologist and writer

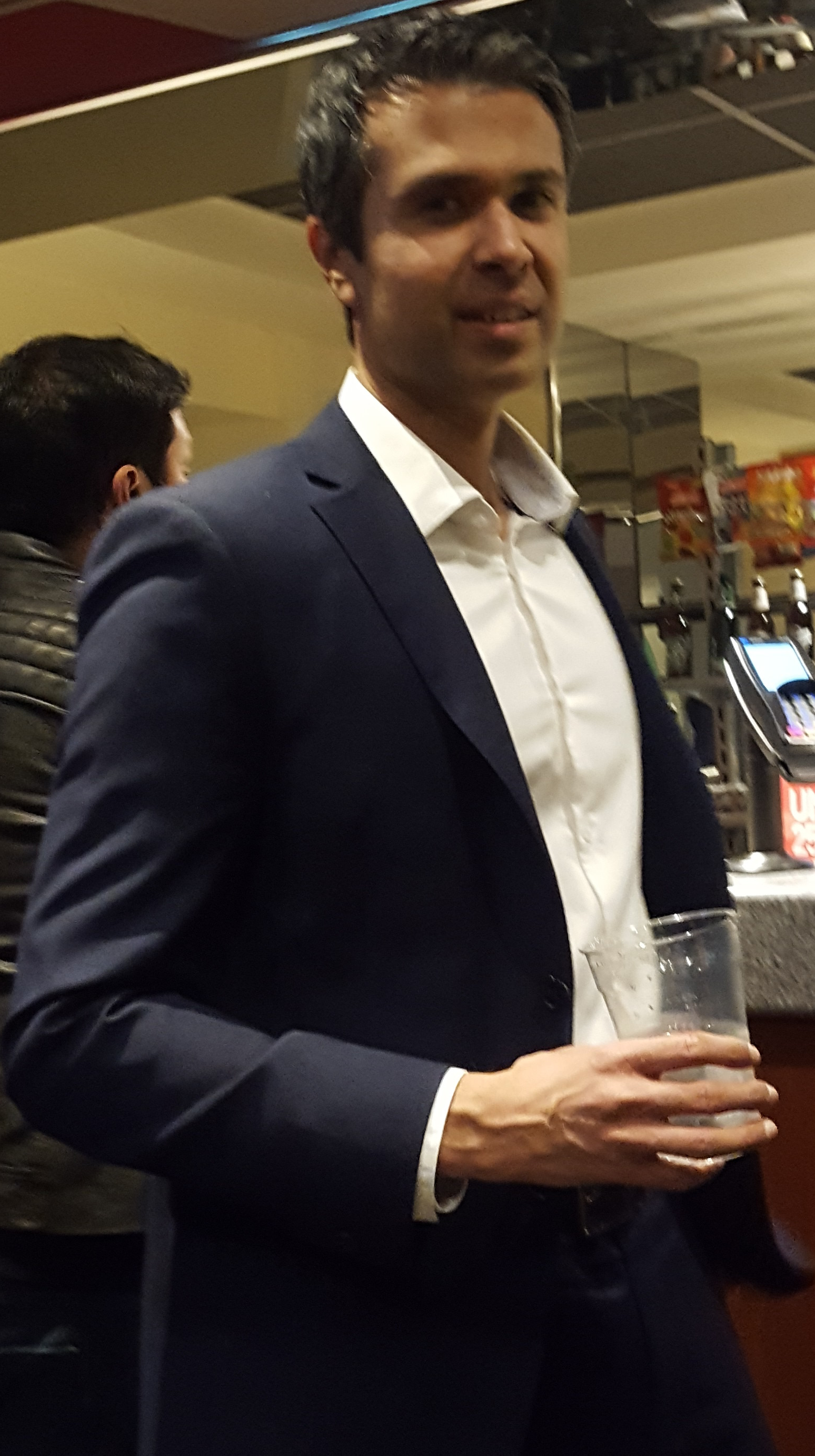
- Malhotra in 2016
- Born: 1977 (age 48–49); New Delhi, India
- Education: Manchester Grammar School, University of Edinburgh
- Occupations: Cardiologist, writer
- Website: doctoraseem.com

Aseem Malhotra is a British cardiologist and author, whose COVID-19 vaccine and anti-statin views have been criticised as misinformation by experts. He contends that people should reduce sugar in their diet, adopt a low-carb and high-fat diet, and reduce their use of prescription drugs. He was the first science director of Action on Sugar in 2014, was listed as one of The Sunday Times 500 most influential people in 2016, and was twice recognized as one of the top fifty black and minority ethnic community member pioneers in the UK's National Health Service by the Health Service Journal. Malhotra is co-author of a book called The Pioppi Diet.

Malhotra's views on diet and health have been criticized by the British Heart Foundation as "misleading and wrong", and his public questioning of the need to ever use statins has been condemned as a danger to public health. His "Pioppi diet" was named by the British Dietetic Association as one of the "top 5 worst celeb diets to avoid in 2018".

During the COVID-19 pandemic, Malhotra published a book called The 21-Day Immunity Plan, which claimed, without the backing of evidence from medical research, that following the diet can quickly help people reduce their risk from the virus. Despite initially campaigning for the COVID vaccine, he later campaigned against the use of COVID mRNA vaccines contrary to the available evidence. On June 3, 2026, Dr. Malhotra testified in front of a US Senate concerning the potential harms of COVID-19 mRNA vaccines.

== Biography ==
=== Early influences ===
Malhotra was born in New Delhi in India in October 1977. He was the younger son of two doctors: Kailash Chand and Anisha Malhotra. The family moved to Britain in 1978 when his father had a clinical attachment at Alder Hey Hospital and was studying for a Diploma in Tropical Medicine at Liverpool University. Both parents became General Practitioners in Ashton-under-Lyne, Greater Manchester. In 1988 Malhotra's brother Amit, who was two years older than Malhotra and had been born with Down's syndrome, died of heart failure aged thirteen. This inspired Malhotra with the ambition to become a cardiologist. Malhotra was privately educated at Manchester Grammar School.

Malhotra's father went on to become the first Asian to be elected as honorary vice-president and deputy chair of the council of the British Medical Association and was appointed Order of the British Empire (OBE) for long-standing service to the NHS. Malhotra's mother's religious faith was important to her and Malhotra observed that she fasted weekly by only consuming one meal on a fast day. He was quoted later as claiming his mother's vegetarian diet contributed to her 'premature and painful death' and said he hoped "we can learn that much of these ills are preventable."

=== Career ===
Malhotra studied medicine at the University of Edinburgh and graduated in 2001. He spent his foundation years as a doctor in Scotland, at Wishaw General Hospital then at the Royal Infirmary of Edinburgh and finally at Liberton Hospital which specialises in care of the elderly. He completed his post-graduate medical diploma during two years working at the Manchester Royal Infirmary. He held specialist registrar positions at St James's University Hospital in Leeds and Blackpool Victoria Hospital.

Malhotra has held cardiology posts with the UK National Health Service as a cardiology specialist registrar at Harefield Hospital, at the Royal Free Hospital in Hampstead and as an Honorary Consultant Cardiologist at Frimley Park Hospital. and Lister Hospital in Stevenage. When Action on Sugar was founded in 2014, he became its first Science Director. He is a former Consultant Clinical Associate to the Academy of Medical Royal Colleges. In 2018 he was a visiting professor at Bahiana School of Medicine and Public Health, Salvador, Brazil. In 2015 he was appointed as a trustee of the King's Fund and was reappointed for a further three years in 2018. In 2021, Malhotra was appointed chair of the scientific advisory committee of the small UK charity The Public Health Collaboration. On 20 Feb 2023, the Public Health Collaboration announced that Malhotra was no longer part of the organisation.

In January 2023, a group of doctors, including some General Practitioners, called on the General Medical Council to investigate Aseem Malhotra's fitness to practice due to what they claim is his 'high-profile promotion of misinformation about Covid-19 mRNA vaccines'. On 2 June 2023, the doctors took the first formal step in legal proceedings against the GMC by sending them the formal pre-action protocol letter. This stated 'we are bringing this legal action because we believe that the GMC, as the official regulator of doctors' professional standards, has a duty to act in this case.' On 15 February 2024 the GMC stated that it had identified an error in its decision making.

In August 2023, Malhotra announced he had been appointed co-chair of the London division of the British Association of Physicians of Indian Origin (BAPIO). Later the same day the announcement was removed from BAPIO's website.

== Public health campaigns and misinformation ==
=== Reducing the consumption of sugar and junk foods ===
Malhotra campaigns about reducing the consumption of sugar and junk foods, particularly for children. Malhotra argues that it is unrealistic to expect individuals to avoid cheap, unhealthy, heavily marketed foods and that changes to regulation are needed. He draws analogies to the regulations on tobacco needed to reduce smoking. He believes that hospital vending machines which sell sweets or junk food sends the wrong message. At the time of the London Olympics in 2012, he criticized the choice of sponsors: writing that "In the context of an obesity epidemic I find it obscene that the Olympics chooses to associate itself with fast food, sugary drinks, chocolate and alcohol."

His campaigns on these topics have brought him recognition and accolades including as a children's food hero in 2013, one of the top 50 BME pioneers in the NHS in 2013, one of London's brightest stars working in Science and Technology in 2014, and one of the Times Top 500 most influential people in the UK in 2016.

=== Pioppi diet and low carb diet advocacy ===
In 2017, Malhotra co-authored the low-carb book The Pioppi Diet, which provides a 21-day eating plan. Dietitians have described the Pioppi Diet as a low-carbohydrate fad diet.

The book recommends the daily consumption of two to four table spoons of extra-virgin olive oil, a small handful of tree nuts, five to seven portions of fibrous vegetables, and low sugar fruits and oily fish at least three times a week. It also advises people to avoid all added sugars, fruit juice, honey, syrups, refined carbohydrates, anything flour based (including all bread, pastries, cakes, biscuits, muesli bars, packaged noodles, pasta, couscous, and rice), and seed oils. Very dark chocolate, butter, coconut oil, cheese, and yoghurt are allowed. The moderate consumption of alcohol is allowed but only within the limits set by the NHS, and a maximum of 500g of red meat per week is recommended in line with the recommendations of the World Cancer Research Fund. It promotes a higher fat intake with fewer carbs than the NHS reference intakes. The diet is called Pioppi after the Italian village recognized as the home of the Mediterranean diet. The authors use the lifestyles of residents of the town to explain the principles of a healthier lifestyle and the book also explains how policy changes are needed to change the obesogenic environment.

The Pioppi diet book has endorsements from then Member of Parliament (MP) Andy Burnham and Dame Sue Bailey, Chair of the Academy of Medical Royal Colleges. Keith Vaz, who was the chair of the all-party parliamentary group on diabetes, promoted it to fellow MPs and then MP and Labour Deputy Leader, Tom Watson.

The British Nutrition Foundation's response to the Pioppi diet explained that there is no single definition of the Mediterranean diet. However, they identified that the advice in the Pioppi diet to cut out starchy carbohydrates is not consistent with an actual Mediterranean diet, which would include bread, pasta and rice. In addition, Mediterranean diets are normally low in saturated fat, which is contrary to the advice in the book that people can eat as much saturated fat as they like. Rosemary Stanton also says that in most traditional Mediterranean diets, bread would be a part of every meal.

The Pioppi diet was listed as one of the "top 5 worst celeb diets to avoid in 2018" by the British Dietetic Association. According to the BDA and others, it is a new spin on a low-carb high-fat diet that "hijacked" the term Mediterranean diet (e.g. substituting cauliflower for rice or pizza base and cooking with coconut oil are not parts of the traditional diet of the villagers of Pioppi).

=== Saturated fat, cholesterol and statins ===
The UK National Health Service website states that: "Too much fat in your diet, especially saturated fats, can raise your cholesterol, which increases the risk of heart disease". This advice is part of the scientific consensus on saturated fat shared with the World Health Organization and the health authorities of many other nations.

Current guidelines for doctors from the National Institute for Health and Care Excellence for reducing the risk of cardiovascular disease include giving advice on lifestyle changes before prescribing statins. Such advice includes: eating a healthy diet, exercising, stopping smoking, limiting alcohol and maintaining a healthy weight. The Director of the Centre for Guidelines at NICE, stated that the use of statins in people with established heart disease was not controversial and was but based on robust evidence.

Malhotra however, believes that a saturated fat in larger quantities is key to a healthy diet: he is known to put a tablespoon of butter and coconut oil into his coffee. He has attacked the standard advice on saturated fat consumption to reduce the risk of cardiovascular disease. In 2017 Malhotra wrote an opinion piece for the British Journal of Sports Medicine which made the claim that saturated fat did "not clog the arteries" and that heart disease can be cured with a daily walk and "eating real food". The British Heart Foundation criticised these "misleading and wrong" claims and several researchers took issue with the methodology of the report on which Malhotra based his claims. Prof Louis Levy, the head of nutrition science at Public Health England says "There is good evidence that a high intake of saturated fat increases your risk of heart disease".

Malhotra denounces what he calls the government's "obsession" with levels of total cholesterol, which, he says, has led to the overmedication of millions of people with statins, and has diverted attention from the "more egregious" risk factor of atherogenic dyslipidaemia. He has questioned the value of statins, and campaigned against their use. Rory Collins, an Oxford medical professor, has also sharply criticised Malhotra, and accused him of endangering lives. Collins has been quoted as saying that scare stories about statins could be as dangerous to public health as Andrew Wakefield's bogus claims about vaccination and autism.

With Robert H. Lustig and Maryanne Demasi, Malhotra authored a 2017 article in The Pharmaceutical Journal which disputes the Lipid hypothesis, the link between blood cholesterol levels and occurrence of heart disease. The article was criticized, for being based on cherry-picked science and for creating the impression that most doctors don't believe that diet and exercise are as important as drugs, and that drugs and lifestyle changes are an either/or paradigm. Cardiologist Tim Chico commented that "high cholesterol has been proven beyond all doubt to contribute to coronary artery disease and heart attack ... to say the cholesterol hypothesis is dead is simply incorrect".

=== Too Much Medicine campaign ===
In 2015, as a member of the Academy of Medical Royal Colleges' Choosing Wisely Steering Group, Aseem Malhotra launched and coordinated a "US initiative to get doctors to stop using interventions with no benefit" - the Too Much Medicine campaign - a partnership with the BMJ and the Academy of Medical Royal Colleges. The aims of the project were to reduce unnecessary treatment and overuse, and introduce an option to patients of "doing nothing". At the campaign's launch, Malhotra stated that over-diagnosis and over-treatment is "the greatest threat to our healthcare system". He also held that in the UK at least £2bn is wasted each year on unnecessary tests and treatment. His claims were supported by Sir Richard Thompson, a past president of the Royal College of Physicians.

=== COVID-19 ===
==== COVID-19 and diet ====
In 2020 during the COVID-19 pandemic and before there were any approved vaccines for COVID-19, Malhotra published a book claiming that following his dietary advice could grant "metabolic optimization" which would, in 21 days, decrease the risk of viral infection. David Gorski criticized the book noting that the biggest single risk factor for COVID-19 infection is age, which people cannot change. Gorski said that while Malhotra had a germ of a good point and that it was undeniable that losing weight for someone who is obese would reduce their risk of complications, the claims about the book were massively exaggerated and there was no specific evidence for the impact of lifestyle recommendations on the risk of COVID-19 or that Malhotra's version of a healthy diet was better or worse than any other healthy lifestyle recommendation. Gorski was also concerned that telling people that they should be in control of their susceptibility to disease may have an element of victim blaming because that shifts responsibility for disease onto individuals, many of whom are unable to follow the kind of diet Malhotra advocates.

==== COVID-19 vaccine controversy ====
Malhotra initially campaigned in favour of taking the COVID vaccine. Later however, he campaigned against the use of COVID mRNA vaccines contrary to the available evidence. In November 2021, Malhotra appeared on GB News to discuss an abstract for an academic poster published by Steven Gundry and which the American Heart Association had warned may contain "potential errors". Malhotra claimed that the abstract supported "a significantly increased risk from 11% at five years, the risk of heart attack, to 25%." after taking mRNA vaccines against COVID-19. Full Fact warned that "Serious concerns have been raised as to the quality of the research".

In September 2022, Malhotra publicly campaigned against the use of COVID mRNA vaccines. An AFP factcheck warned of his claims: "This is false; experts say his research misleads on the risks of vaccination by cherry-picking evidence and relying on flawed studies, and public health authorities agree the benefits of the shots outweigh the risks."

The Editor of The Lancet, Richard Horton, reported on a presentation by Malhotra 7 November 2022 at a public meeting organised by the Association of Naturopathic Practitioners at Friends House, London.

'Malhotra's method of argument deserves scrutiny to understand why it persuades some people. Frame one's view as the reluctant endpoint of a personal journey. Quote respected scientists. Stand up to corporates. Place oneself firmly on the side of patients. Emphasise well described concerns about the presentation of research evidence. Allude to correlations. Make the call for access to raw data an issue of trust and transparency.

After the meeting descended into chaos, Horton observed that 'this descent into unreason is what happens when you inflame public anxieties. It needs to stop.' Frank Han, a paediatric cardiologist, reviewed Malhotra's 20 claims in the presentation and concluded the majority were unsupported by scientific evidence.

In January 2023, during a BBC interview on the prescription of statins, Malhotra made unprompted claims about excess cardiac deaths and COVID vaccines. The BBC apologised that these claims were not challenged at the time. The British Heart Foundation and scientific experts including noted immunologist Peter Openshaw subsequently refuted the claims.

In September 2025, Malhotra appeared at the Reform UK conference, where he claimed that COVID vaccines were responsible for cancers in members of the Royal Family. Malhotra's speech was introduced by Reform chairman David Bull, who stated that Malhotra had helped to write Reform's health policy. The speech was condemned by health secretary Wes Streeting who said "When we are seeing falling numbers of parents getting their children vaccinated, and a resurgence of disease we had previously eradicated, it is shockingly irresponsible for Nigel Farage to give a platform to these poisonous lies". Streeting demanded Farage apologise and sever ties with Malhotras' views. A spokesperson for Cancer Research UK said "There is no good evidence of a link between the Covid-19 vaccine and cancer risk. The vaccine is a safe and effective way to protect against the infection and prevent serious symptoms." Buckingham Palace did not comment.

== Awards and honours ==
In addition to his work as a cardiologist, Malhotra has been described as a "highly regarded public health campaigner" and an anti-obesity expert who is "passionate about tackling the companies and policies responsible for creating ... an obesogenic environment". He explains that his professional work has motivated his public health campaigning: "...having seen the unspeakable suffering caused by diet-related diseases, I would much rather these patients did not develop them in the first place."

In 2013 Malhotra was recognized in the inaugural list of the top 50 BME Pioneers in the NHS Health Service Journal, for his research into sugar-rich diets, obesity and cardio-vascular disease, as well as his public health campaigns, including profit-making of big corporations at the expense of public health, unhealthy hospital meals, and the sale of junk food in hospitals. The judges commented that "Yes. He challenges people". At the end of 2013, Malhotra was named a "Food Hero" for the Children's Food Campaign for campaigning against junk food being marketed to children, and sugar-filled vending machines in hospitals.

In 2014 Malhotra was recognized for a second year running in the Health Services Journal top 50 BME Pioneers: described by the judges as "An upcoming star", the entry recognized that he had ignited a debate about over-investigation, over-diagnosis and overmedication and brought media attention to the BMJ's "Too much medicine" campaign. Also in 2014, his campaigning on sugar led to his being featured in the Evening Standard as being one of ten of London's brightest stars working in science and technology. In 2018 the Guardian's health correspondent, Sarah Boseley, labelled Malhotra as a "dissident scientist", "statin critic" and "cholesterol sceptic".

At an informal dinner in July 2022 organised by the International Medical Graduates Group during the British Medical Association's Annual Representative meeting, Malhotra was given an award. A photograph and tweets by the IMG and Malhotra implied this was an official BMA award. BMA president Chaand Nagpaul apologised to conference attendees and clarified that "this was not a formal BMA award and neither I nor the BMA endorse the views held by Aseem Malhotra."

In September 2023, Malhotra received the Rusty Razor Award, a prize given to "the year's worst promoters of pseudoscience".

== Selected bibliography ==
=== Books ===
- The Pioppi Diet: A 21-Day Lifestyle Plan (with Donal O'Neill), Penguin Books, 2017 ISBN 9781405932639
- The 21-Day Immunity Plan, Yellow Kite, 2020 ISBN 9781529349672
- A Statin-Free Life: A revolutionary life plan for tackling heart disease - without the use of statins, Hodder & Stoughton, 2021 ISBN 9781529354102
