= William P. Castelli =

American physician and epidemiologist (1931–2025)

- Born: 21 November 1931; New York City, U.S.
- Died: 19 January 2025 (aged 93); Marlboro, Massachusetts, U.S.
- Occupation: Physician

William Peter Castelli (November 21, 1931 – January 19, 2025) was an American physician, epidemiologist and director of the Framingham Heart Study.

== Early life and career ==
Castelli was born at New York City on November 21, 1931. He graduated B.S. in zoology from Yale College in 1953 and received his MD from Université catholique de Louvain in 1959.

Castelli completed his internship at Kings County Hospital Center in 1959 and completed a residency in medicine at Lemuel Shattuck Hospital. He did his post-doctoral fellowship with David Rutstein at the Department of Preventive Medicine at Harvard Medical School. He joined the Framingham Heart Study in 1965. He was the director of the Framingham Heart Study 1979–1995. He has credited data from the Framingham Heart Study to lower cholesterol levels as saving his own life.

He established the Framingham Cardiovascular Institute for which he was medical director. Castelli taught epidemiology and prevention of atherosclerotic cardiovascular disease at Harvard Medical School, Boston University School of Medicine and University of Massachusetts Medical School. He advocated a diet low in saturated fat to reduce heart disease risk.

== Personal life and death ==
Castelli married Marjorie Irene Fish; they had several children. Castelli died in Marlboro, Massachusetts on January 19, 2025, at the age of 93.

== Selected publications ==
- Incidence of Coronary Heart Disease and Lipoprotein Cholesterol Levels: The Framingham Study (1986)
- Cholesterol and Mortality: 30 Years of Follow-up From the Framingham Study (1987)
- How to Lower Your Cholesterol & Beat the Odds of a Heart Attack (1989)
- Lipids and risk of coronary heart disease: The Framingham Study (1992)
- Epidemiology of triglycerides: A view from Framingham (1992)
- Lipids, risk factors and ischaemic heart disease (1996)
- The New Good Fat Bad Fat: Lower Your Cholesterol and Reduce Your Odds of a Heart Attack (1997)
- Cholesterol Cures: More Than 325 Natural Ways to Lower Cholesterol and Live Longer from Almonds and Chocolate to Garlic and Wine (2002)
