= Elsworth R. Buskirk =

Elsworth R. Buskirk (August 11, 1925 – March 28, 2010) was a leading environmental and exercise physiologist.

== Early life, education, and career ==
Born in Beloit, Wisconsin, Buskirk attended Beloit High School and the University of Wisconsin before serving in the United States Army in the European theatre of World War II, from 1943 to 1946. After the war, he received a B.A. from St. Olaf College in 1950, followed by a M.A. from the University of Minnesota. He entered the Physiological Hygiene Ph.D. Program, where he worked with Dr. Ancel Keys, graduating in 1954.

After receiving his Ph.D., Buskirk joined the United States Army Quartermaster Research and Development Center (later the United States Army Research Institute of Environmental Medicine under the Combat Capabilities Development Command Soldier Center) in Natick, Massachusetts, where he became Chief of the Environmental Physiology Section, remaining until 1957. In the late 1950s, Buskirk coauthored two papers with Henry L. Taylor "describing the criteria for measuring maximal oxygen uptake and establishing that measure as the 'gold standard' for cardiorespiratory fitness". He then worked for the National Institute of Arthritis and Metabolic Diseases under the National Institutes of Health, in Bethesda, Maryland.

== Penn State University ==
In 1963, Buskirk was hired by the Pennsylvania State University where he spent the remaining three decades of his academic career.

The team of McCoy and Lawther made the first major move to greater academic and research respectability in 1963 when they hired Elsworth Buskirk, with a Ph.D. in physiology from the University of Minnesota. Buskirk was the first of a number of faculty members hired in the 1960s and 1970s, many of whom came to the School of Physical Education with degrees in specific academic disciplines outside physical education, such as physiology, anatomy, engineering, psychology, history, and philosophy. Buskirk, a research physiologist hired out of the National Institute of Health, gave academic status to the school. For research, he almost immediately created a Human Performance Laboratory (later Noll Laboratory) in the abandoned team room complex under the bleachers of the football stadium, after the stadium was moved from central campus to the periphery of campus in 1959.

At Penn State, Buskirk "founded an intercollege graduate program focusing on applied physiology (1966) and constructed The Laboratory for Human Performance Research (1974)". Over the course of his career, Buskirk was associated with over 250 publications, chapters, and review articles, as well as several textbooks, also serving as a reviewer or editorial board member for over a dozen scientific journals.

== Personal life and death ==
In 1948, Buskirk married Mable Heen, whom he had met at St. Olaf College. They were married for 62 years, until his death, and had two daughters.

A Fellow of the American Physiological Society, in 2009, the organization selected Buskirk to be profiled by their Living History Project, recognizing "senior members who have made extraordinary contributions during their career to the advancement of the discipline and profession of physiology". Buskirk kept up with developments in exercise physiology for many years after his retirement, and died at the Village at Penn State retirement community at the age of 84. In 1971, Buskirk was inducted as an Associate Fellow in the prestigious National Academy of Kinesiology (formerly American Academy of Physical Education; American Academy of Kinesiology and Physical Education).
