= Seven Countries Study =

American epidemiological longitudinal study

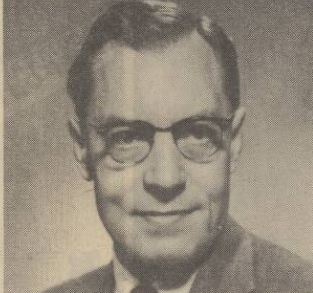
Ancel Keys

The Seven Countries Study is an epidemiological longitudinal study directed by Ancel Keys at what is today the University of Minnesota Laboratory of Physiological Hygiene & Exercise Science (LPHES). Begun in 1956 with a yearly grant of US$200,000 from the U.S. Public Health Service, the study was first published in 1978 and then followed up on its subjects every five years thereafter.

As the world's first multicountry epidemiological study, it systematically examined the relationships between lifestyle, diet, coronary heart disease and stroke in different populations from different regions of the world. It directed attention to the causes of coronary heart disease and stroke, but also showed that an individual’s risk can be changed.

Writing in 1975, project officer Henry Blackburn identified two "strikingly polar attitudes", characterising them as persisting "academic" and "pragmatic" views with "much talk from each and little listening between."

== History ==
In the 1940s, a University of Minnesota researcher, Ancel Keys, postulated that the apparent epidemic of heart attacks in middle-aged American men was related to their mode of life and possibly modifiable physical characteristics. He first explored this idea in a group of Minnesota business and professional men (executives aged 45 to 55) that he recruited into a prospective study in 1947, the first of many cohort studies eventually mounted internationally. The U.S. Public Health Service agreed to fund the study (and then set up and proceeded to fund the Framingham Heart Study on a larger scale). The Minnesota men were followed through 1981 and the first major report appeared in 1963 after the fifteen-year follow-up study.

The study contributed much to survey methods and confirmed larger studies that reported earlier on the predictive value for heart attack of several characteristics, the now-traditional risk factors of blood pressure and blood cholesterol level and cigarette smoking. Keys traveled widely with his wife Margaret who tested people's serum cholesterol. They sent their samples back to Minnesota for analysis. In 1952, Keys's hypothesis that coronary heart disease could be related to diet was first published in Voeding in The Netherlands. His work in post-wartime Naples led him to seek organization and funding for studies of different populations, as did his subsequent work in Uganda; Cape Town, South Africa; Sardinia; Bologna; and Ilomantsi, Finland; and with Japanese men living in Hawaii and in Japan. He decided to concentrate on men living in villages, rather than those in cities where the population moved around frequently.

In the mid-1950s, with improved methods and design, Keys recruited collaborating researchers in seven countries to mount the first cross-cultural comparison of heart attack risk in populations of men engaged in traditional occupations in cultures contrasting in diet, especially in the proportion of fat calories of different composition, the Seven Countries Study still under observation today.

The Seven Countries Study was formally started in fall 1958 in Yugoslavia. In total, 12,763 males, 40–59 years of age, were enrolled as 16 cohorts, in seven countries, in four regions of the world (United States, Northern Europe, Southern Europe, Japan). One cohort is in the United States, two cohorts in Finland, one in the Netherlands, three in Italy, five in Yugoslavia (two in Croatia, and three in Serbia), two in Greece, and two in Japan. The entry examinations were performed between 1958 and 1964 with an average participation rate of 90%, lowest in the US, with 75% and highest in one of the Japanese cohorts, with 100%. The study has continued for more than 50 years.

== Major findings ==
The Seven Countries Study suggested that the risk and rates of heart attack and stroke (CVR), both at the population level and at the individual level, correlated directly and independently to the level of total serum cholesterol, in seven sampled out countries. It demonstrated that the correlation between blood cholesterol level and coronary heart disease (CHD) risk from 5 to 40 years follow-up is found consistently across different specially selected cultures in these seven countries. Cholesterol and obesity correlated with increased mortality from cancer. The Seven Countries Study suggested that elevated blood pressure (hypertension) was correlated with risk of coronary heart disease and stroke. It showed that the mortality rate after a coronary heart disease event or stroke was associated with the level of hypertension. In several cohorts of the study, stroke deaths exceeded deaths from coronary heart disease. It hinted that differences in overall mortality between the different regions of the seven countries are largely associated with variation in cardiovascular mortality. Coronary deaths in the United States and Northern Europe greatly exceeded those in Southern Europe, even when controlled for age, cholesterol, blood pressure, smoking, physical activity, and weight.

The Seven Countries Study was investigated further in regard to an eating pattern loosely characterized as the Mediterranean Diet. What exactly is meant by "Mediterranean Diet" today, was detailed by Antonia Trichopoulou (wife of Dimitrios Trichopoulos), and Anna Ferro-Luzzi. The diet was publicized and popularized by Greg Drescher of the Oldways Preservation and Exchange Trust and by Walter Willett of the Harvard School of Public Health.

The Seven Countries Study also showed that the slowly changing habits of a population in the Mediterranean region, from a healthy, active lifestyle and diet, to a less active lifestyle and a diet influenced by the Western pattern diet, significantly correlated with increased risk of heart disease. Meanwhile, it has been confirmed by other researchers that there is an inverse association between adherence to the Mediterranean Diet and the incidence of fatal and non- fatal heart disease in initially healthy middle-aged adults in the Mediterranean region.

The Seven Countries Study, along with other studies, e.g., the Framingham Heart Study and the Nurses' Health Study, showed the importance of overweight, obesity and regular exercise as health issues. It showed a correlation between good cardiovascular health and dementia in the general population. It also showed that cardiovascular risk factors in mid life are significantly associated with increased risk of dementia death later in life. It indicated that cigarette smoking is a highly significant predictor of the development of coronary heart disease, leading to excess rates of angina pectoris, myocardial infarction (MI) and coronary death, along with other studies about smoking, e.g., the Framingham Heart Study and the British Doctors Study.

== Influence on public health policy ==
Initial results from the Seven Countries Study in North Karelia (Finland) prompted public pressure for the authorities to act to reduce historically high levels of chronic disease in the region. The results influenced a subsequent public health program, the North Karelia Project, which ran from 1972 until 1997, and which had among its aims a reduction in levels of peoples' saturated fat intake.. The rate of deaths from cardiovascular disease in working age men (between 35 and 64 years of age) was reduced by more than 80% (from 690 per 100,000 annually to 100 per 100,000 annually). The life expectancy of the entire population increased by 7 years and surveys also showed an improvement in subjective health perceptions.

== See also ==
- Lipid hypothesis
- Atherosclerosis
