= Lipid hypothesis =

Medical hypothesis

The lipid hypothesis (also known as the cholesterol hypothesis) is a medical theory postulating a link between blood cholesterol levels and the occurrence of cardiovascular disease. A summary from 1976 described it as: "measures used to lower the plasma lipids in patients with hyperlipidemia will lead to reductions in new events of coronary heart disease". It states, more concisely, that "decreasing blood cholesterol [...] significantly reduces coronary heart disease".

As of 2023, there is international clinical acceptance of the lipid hypothesis.

The lipid hypothesis concerns blood cholesterol, which is not directly governed by dietary cholesterol but is influenced by it, albeit in ways that vary among individuals.

== History ==
In 1856, the German pathologist Rudolf Virchow first described lipid accumulation in arterial walls. However, the initial connection between arteriosclerosis and dietary cholesterol would not be established until the research of Russian pathologist Nikolay Anichkov, prior to World War I. In 1913, a study by Anichkov showed that rabbits fed a high cholesterol diet developed lesions in their arteries similar to atherosclerosis, suggesting a role for cholesterol in atherogenesis.

Dutch physician Cornelis de Langen noted the correlation between nutritional cholesterol intake and incidence of gallstones in Javanese people in 1916. de Langen showed that the traditional Javanese diet, poor in cholesterol and other lipids, was associated with a low level of blood cholesterol and low incidence of cardiovascular disease (CVD), while the prevalence of CVD in Europeans living in Java on a Western diet was higher. Since de Langen published his results only in Dutch, his work remained unknown to most of the international scientific community until the 1940s and 1950s. By 1951, it was accepted that, although the causes of atheroma were still unknown, fat deposition was a major feature of the disease process. "The so-called fatty flecks or streaks of arteries are the early lesions of atherosclerosis and... may develop into the more advanced lesions of the disease."

=== Ancel Keys and the Seven Countries Study ===
==== Ancel Keys ====
With the emergence of CVD as a major cause of death in the Western world in the middle of the 20th century, the lipid hypothesis received greater attention. In the 1940s, a University of Minnesota researcher, Ancel Keys, postulated that the apparent epidemic of heart attacks in middle-aged American men was related to their mode of life and possibly modifiable physical characteristics. He first explored this idea in a group of Minnesota business and professional men that he recruited into a prospective study in 1947, the first of many cohort studies eventually mounted internationally. The first major report appeared in 1963 and the men were followed through until 1981. After fifteen years follow-up, the study confirmed the results of larger studies that reported earlier on the predictive value for heart attack of several risk factors: blood pressure, blood cholesterol level, and cigarette smoking.

==== Seven Countries Study ====
Keys presented his diet-lipid-heart disease hypothesis at a 1955 expert meeting of the World Health Organization in Geneva. In response to criticism at the conference, Keys recruited collaborating researchers in seven countries to mount the first cross-cultural comparison, the years-long Seven Countries Study. This was to compare the heart attack risk in populations of men engaged in traditional occupations and being from cultures with different diets, especially in the proportion of fat calories of different composition. There was also criticism before the study began: Yerushalmy and Hilleboe pointed out that Keys had selected for the study the countries that would give him the results he wanted, while leaving out data from sixteen countries that would not; they also pointed out that the correlation between animal protein consumption and heart disease was stronger than that between cholesterol and heart disease. Thus, Keys was studying a "tenuous association" rather than any possible proof of causality. Keys then joined the nutrition committee of the American Heart Association (AHA), successfully promulgated his idea, and in 1961, the AHA became the first group anywhere in the world to advise cutting back on saturated fat (and dietary cholesterol) to prevent heart disease. This historic recommendation was reported on the cover of Time Magazine in that same year.

The Seven Countries Study was formally started in fall 1958 in Yugoslavia. In total, 12,763 males, 40–59 years of age, were enrolled in seven countries, in four regions of the world (United States, Northern Europe, Southern Europe, Japan). One cohort is in the United States, two cohorts in Finland, one in the Netherlands, three in Italy, five in Yugoslavia (two in Croatia, and three in Serbia), two in Greece, and two in Japan. The entry examinations were performed between 1958 and 1964 with an average participation rate of 90%, lowest in the US, with 75%, and highest in one of the Japanese cohorts, with 100%.

Keys' book Eat Well and Stay Well popularized the idea that reducing the amount of saturated fat in the diet would reduce cholesterol levels and the risks of serious diseases due to atheroma. Keys was followed during the rest of the 20th century by an accumulation of work that repeatedly demonstrated associations between cholesterol levels (and other modifiable risk factors including smoking and exercise) and risks of heart disease. These led to the acceptance of the lipid hypothesis as orthodoxy by much of the medical community. By the end of the 1980s, there were widespread academic statements that the lipid hypothesis was proven beyond reasonable doubt, or, as one article stated, "universally recognized as a law."

=== Consensus ===
The medical consensus supports the lipid hypothesis as evidence from separate meta-analyses, prospective epidemiologic studies and randomized clinical trials have demonstrated that elevated levels of LDL blood cholesterol are a significant risk factor for atherosclerotic cardiovascular disease. As all LDL particles are potentially atherogenic it is the quantity of LDL particles in circulation that is the main determinant of atherosclerosis progression. A normal non-atherogenic LDL-C level is 20–40 mg/dl. Guidelines recommend maintaining LDL-C under 2.6 mmol/L (100 mg/dl) and under 1.8 mmol/L (70 mg/dL) for those at high risk.

The National Lipid Association have stated that by 2012, a wealth of evidence including numerous clinical trials examined by the Cholesterol Treatment Trialists' Collaboration has confirmed the lipid hypothesis. Too much LDL (called "bad cholesterol") can lead to fatty deposits building up in the arteries, which increases the risk of cardiovascular disease. A 2017 consensus statement from the European Atherosclerosis Society concluded that "consistent evidence from numerous and multiple different types of clinical and genetic studies unequivocally establishes that LDL causes ASCVD." The consensus statement noted:

Most publications that question the causal effect of LDL on the development of ASCVD tend to cite evidence from individual studies or a small group of highly selected studies, often without a quantitative synthesis of the presented evidence. Therefore, to avoid this type of selection bias, we have based our conclusions on the totality of evidence from separate meta-analyses of genetic studies, prospective epidemiologic studies, Mendelian randomization studies, and randomized clinical trials. This evidence base includes over 200 studies involving over 2 million participants with over 20 million person-years of follow-up and more than 150 000 cardiovascular events. Together these studies provide remarkably consistent and unequivocal evidence that LDL causes ASCVD.

A review from the Journal of the American College of Cardiology in 2018 concluded:

The causal effect of LDL and other apo B–containing lipoproteins on the risk of cardiovascular disease is determined by both the magnitude and the cumulative duration of exposure to these lipoproteins. The goal of maintaining optimal lipid levels throughout life is to keep the concentration of circulating LDL and other apo B–containing lipoproteins low to minimize the number of particles that become retained in the arterial wall and thereby minimize the rate of progression of atherosclerotic plaques.

The 2021 Canadian Cardiovascular Society Guidelines say "We recommend that for any patient with triglycerides > 1.5 mmol/L, non-HDL-C or ApoB be used instead of LDL-C as the preferred lipid parameter for screening (Strong Recommendation, High-Quality Evidence)".

The European Society of Cardiology have noted:

For almost a century, evidence has been overwhelming that lipids and diet are related and have a negative impact on CVD. It is also clear that lipids, and especially LDL, play a crucial role in atherosclerosis. However, groups of “non-believers” decelerated developments and clinical progress, sometimes for decades.

In 2023, the World Heart Federation published a report which stated that high levels of low-density lipoprotein (LDL) cholesterol are a major risk factor for cardiovascular diseases and that elevated LDL cholesterol contributed to 3.8 million deaths in 2021.

== See also ==
- Hypercholesterolemia
- Lipid-lowering agent
- Fatty acid ratio in food
