= Framingham Heart Study =

Cardiovascular cohort study

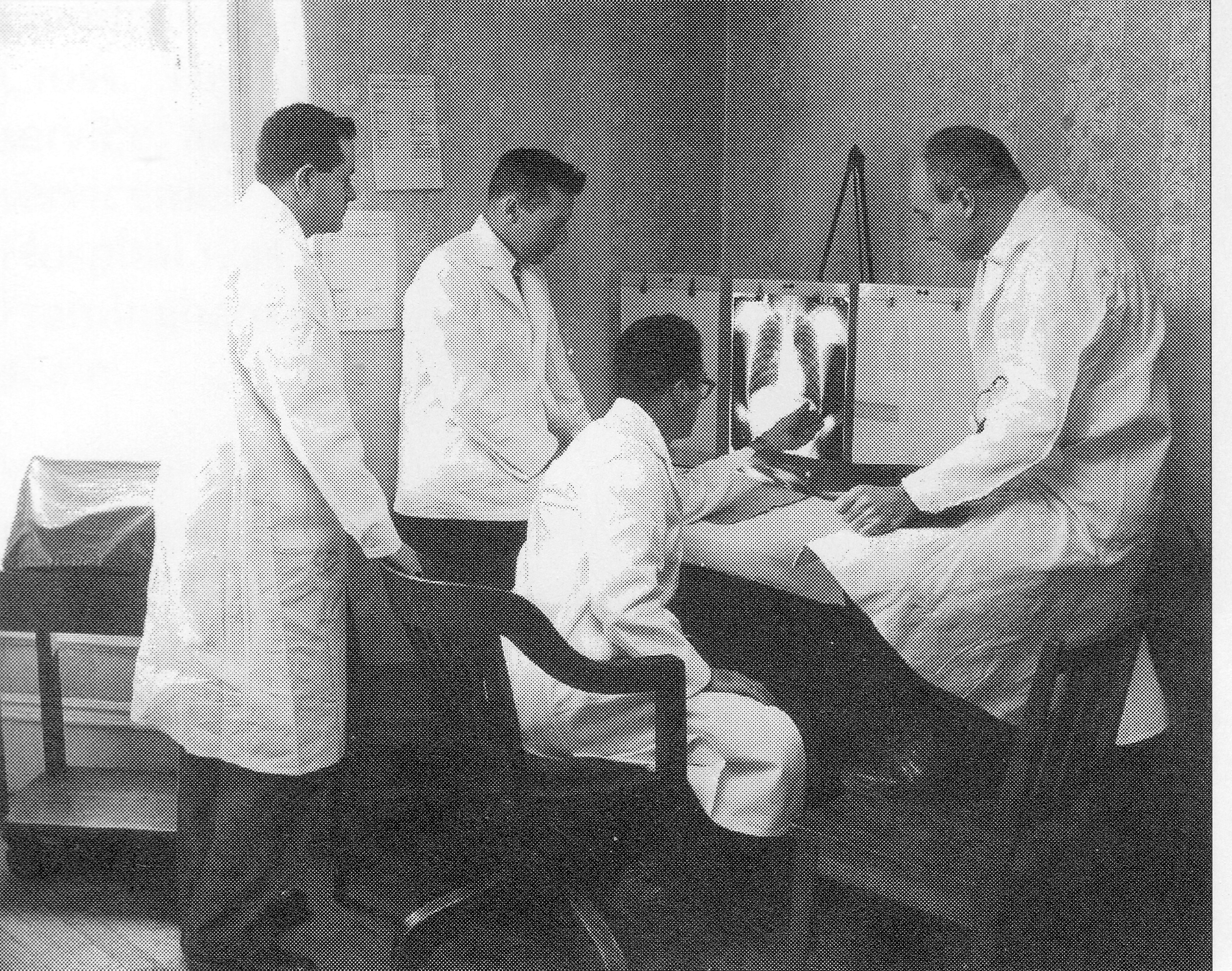
Framingham Heart Study physicians.

The Framingham Heart Study is a long-term, ongoing cardiovascular cohort study of residents of the city of Framingham, Massachusetts. The study began in 1948 with 5,209 adult subjects from Framingham, and is now on its third generation of participants. Prior to the study almost nothing was known about the epidemiology of hypertensive or arteriosclerotic cardiovascular disease. Much of the now-common knowledge concerning heart disease, such as the effects of diet, exercise, and common medications such as aspirin, is based on this longitudinal study. It is a project of the National Heart, Lung, and Blood Institute, in collaboration with (since 1971) Boston University. Various health professionals from the hospitals and universities of Greater Boston staff the project.

== History ==
In 1948, the study was commissioned by the United States Congress, with multiple communities being considered for study. The final choice was between Framingham, Massachusetts, and Paintsville, Kentucky. Framingham was chosen when residents showed more general interest in heart research than Paintsville. Thomas Royle Dawber was director of the study from 1949 to 1966. He was appointed as chief epidemiologist shortly after the start of the project, when it was not progressing well. The study had been intended to last 20 years; however, interest grew in part due to Dr. Dawber's efforts to promote the study and engage in fundraising after he had been transferred to Boston to accept a chairmanship of preventive medicine. By 1968, it was debated whether the original study had served its purpose and should be terminated as scheduled. A committee gathered and considered that, after 20 years of research, the Framingham study should come to an end, since their hypothesis had been tested and extensive information concerning heart diseases had been gathered. Despite this conclusion, Congress failed to accept the recommendation, instead voting to continue the study. The study has been split into different segments, or "cohorts".

William P. Castelli is a former director of the Framingham Heart Study.

- The Original Cohort, founded in 1948, consisted of 5,209 men and women. Requirements for entry were an age between 30 and 62 years at the time of first examination, with no history of heart attack or stroke. Due to lukewarm interest at first, doctors, nurses and healthcare workers volunteered for the study to set an example for patients.
- The Offspring Cohort, founded in 1971, was a second-generation study for which children of the Original Cohort were eligible. Spouses were also eligible if they had become pregnant with or sired two or more children by a participant in the Offspring Cohort.
- The Omni One Cohort, founded in 1994, looked at the possible influence of race and heritage as heart risk factors, as well as the changing racial background of Framingham.
- The Generation Three Cohort, founded in 2002, was a third-generation study consisting of children of the Offspring Cohort and grandchildren of the Original Cohort participants. Minimum age for acceptance was 20 years.
- The Omni Two Cohort, founded in 2003, was a second-generation study involving children of Omni Cohort participants. While the Original Cohort had been spaced over decades, the Omni Cohort had a much shorter generational window. On account of this, participants as young as 13 years of age were eligible for the Omni Two Cohort.

== Strengths and weaknesses ==
Over 3,000 peer-reviewed scientific papers have been published related to the Framingham Heart Study. It is generally accepted that the work is outstanding in its scope and duration, and overall is considered very useful.

It was rightly assumed from the start of the Framingham Heart Study that cardiac health can be influenced by lifestyle and environmental factors, and by inheritance. The Framingham Heart Study is the source of the term risk factor. Before the Framingham Heart Study, doctors had little sense of heart disease prevention. In the 1950s, it was believed that clogging of arteries and narrowing of arteries (atherosclerosis, arteriosclerosis) were normal parts of aging, and that they occurred universally as people became older. High blood pressure (hypertension) and elevated serum cholesterol (hypercholesterolemia) were also seen as normal consequences of aging in the 1950s, and no treatment was available. These and further risk factors, such as homocysteine, were gradually discovered over the years.

The Framingham Heart Study, along with other important large studies, such as the Seven Countries Study and the Nurses' Health Study, also showed that healthy diet, not being overweight or obese, and regular exercise are all important in maintaining good health, and that there are differences in cardiovascular risk between men and women. Along with other important studies about smoking, such as the British Doctors Study, it also confirmed that cigarette smoking is a highly significant factor in the development of heart disease, leading in many cases to angina pectoris, myocardial infarction (MI), and coronary death.

Recently the Framingham studies have come to be regarded as overestimating risk, particularly in the lower risk groups, such as for UK populations.

One question in evidence-based medicine is how closely the people in a study resemble the patient with whom the health care professional is dealing.

Researchers recently used contact information given by subjects over the last 30 years to map the social network of friends and family in the study.

== Framingham Risk Score ==
The 10-year cardiovascular risk of an individual can be estimated with the Framingham Risk Score, including for individuals without known cardiovascular disease. The Framingham Risk Score is based on findings of the Framingham Heart Study.

== Major findings ==
Major findings from the Framingham Heart Study, according to the researchers themselves:

1960s
Cigarette smoking is associated with increased risk of heart disease. Increased cholesterol and elevated blood pressure is associated with increased risk of heart disease. Exercise is associated with decreased risk of heart disease, and obesity with increased risk.
1970s
Elevated blood pressure is associated with increased risk of stroke. In women who are postmenopausal, risk of heart disease is increased, compared with women who are premenopausal. Psychosocial factors affect risk of heart disease.
1980s
High levels of HDL cholesterol is associated with lower risk of heart disease. No empirical evidence found to confirm the rumor that filtered cigarettes lower the risk of heart disease as opposed to non-filters. Elevated levels of fibrinogen are associated with an increased risk of coronary artery disease and stroke.
1990s
Having an enlarged left ventricle of the heart (left ventricular hypertrophy) is associated with increased risk of stroke. Elevated blood pressure can progress to heart failure. Framingham Risk Score is published, and correctly predicts 10-year risk of future coronary heart disease (CHD) events. At 40 years of age, the lifetime risk for CHD is 50% for men and 33% for women.
2000s
So called "high normal blood pressure" is associated with increased risk of cardiovascular disease (high normal blood pressure is called prehypertension in medicine; it is defined as a systolic pressure of 120–139 mm Hg and/or a diastolic pressure of 80–89 mm Hg). Lifetime risk of developing elevated blood pressure is 90%. Obesity is a risk factor for heart failure. Serum aldosterone levels predict risk of elevated blood pressure. Lifetime risk for obesity is approximately 50%. The "SHARe" project is announced, a genome wide association study within the Framingham Heart Study. Social contacts of individuals are relevant to whether a person is obese, and whether cigarette smokers decide to quit smoking. By providing contact information, the Framingham Heart Study establishes a network of personal relationships, connecting participants through their relationships—friends, colleagues, relatives and neighbors. Four risk factors for a precursor of heart failure are discovered. 30-year risk for serious cardiac events can be calculated. American Heart Association considers certain genomic findings of the Framingham Heart Study one of the top research achievements in cardiology. Some genes increase risk of atrial fibrillation. Risk of poor memory is increased in middle aged men and women if the parents had had dementia.

== Study design ==
The Framingham Heart Study participants, and their children and grandchildren, voluntarily consented to undergo a detailed medical history, physical examination, and medical tests every three to five years, creating a wealth of data about physical and mental health, especially about cardiovascular disease. A nonprofit charity, called Friends of the Framingham Heart Study, was founded to help defray study costs and spread awareness of heart issues. Membership is limited to participants.

== Genetic research ==
In recent years, scientists have been carrying out genetic research within the Framingham Heart Study.

Inheritance patterns in families, heritability and genetic correlations, molecular markers, and associations have been studied. The association studies include traditional genetic association studies, i.e., looking for associations of cardiovascular risk with gene polymorphisms (single-nucleotide polymorphisms, SNPs) in candidate genes, and genome wide association studies (GWAS). For example, one genome wide study, called the 100 K Study, included almost 1400 participants of the Framingham Heart Study (from the original cohort, and the offspring cohort), and revealed a genetic variant associated with obesity. The researchers were able to replicate this particular result in four other populations. Further, the SHARe Study (SNP Health Association Resource Study) uncovered new candidate genes, and confirmed already known candidate genes (for homocysteine and vitamin B12 levels) in participants of the Framingham Heart Study.

Because of these genomic results, the Framingham Heart Study has been described as "on its way to becoming the gold standard for cardiovascular genetic epidemiology".

However, clinically, despite these (and other) efforts, the aggregate effect of genes on cardiovascular disease risk beyond that of traditional cardiovascular risk factors has not been established.

== Similar studies ==
- The Busselton Health Study has been carried out since 1966 in a high proportion of the residents of Busselton, a town in Western Australia, over a period of many years. A database has been compiled and is managed by the School of Population Health at the University of Western Australia. Although the results of the Busselton Health Study and the Framingham Heart Study are similar in many aspects, the Busselton Health Study also investigated the influence of some factors that had not been investigated in the Framingham Heart Study, e.g., sleep apnea.
- The Caerphilly Heart Disease Study, also known as the Caerphilly Prospective Study (CaPS), is an epidemiological prospective cohort, set up in 1979 in a representative population sample drawn from a typical small town in South Wales, UK. The study has collected wide-ranging data and has led to over 400 publications in the medical press, notably on vascular disease, cognitive function and healthy living.
- The China–Cornell–Oxford Project, also known as the "China–Oxford–Cornell Study on dietary, lifestyle and disease mortality characteristics in 65 rural Chinese counties". This study was later referred to as "China Study I". The successor study is named "China Study II".
- The Strong Heart Study is an ongoing cohort study of cardiovascular disease and its risk factors among Native American men and women. The original cohort began in 1984 with 4,549 participants ages 35–74 from 13 tribal nations and communities in Arizona, Oklahoma, North Dakota, and South Dakota.
- The Copenhagen City Heart Study, also known as Østerbroundersøgelsen in Danish (referring to the Eastern part of Copenhagen "Østerbro"), is an ongoing prospective cohort study of cardiovascular disease and its risk factors among Danish men and women. The original cohort began in 1976 with 19,698 participants ages 20–93 ]. To date over 930 articles have been published and 76 PhD dissertations defended based on data from the study. Notable findings from the study include the benefits of physical activity in old age, clinical implication of elevated triglyceride levels and effect of genetic disposition of development of cancer and cardiovascular disease."Østerbroundersøgelsen - Den Store Danske (Danish)".

== See also ==
- Long-term experiment

== Footnotes ==
=== Works cited ===
- Daniel Levy and Susan Brink. (2005). A Change of Heart: How the People of Framingham, Massachusetts, Helped Unravel the Mysteries of Cardiovascular Disease. Knopf. ISBN 0-375-41275-1.
