= Ancel Keys =

American physiologist (1904–2004)

- Keys in 1945
- Born: Ancel Benjamin Keys; January 26, 1904; Colorado Springs, Colorado, U.S.
- Died: November 20, 2004 (aged 100); Minneapolis, Minnesota, U.S.
- Education: University of California, Berkeley (BA, MS, PhD) University of Cambridge (PhD)
- Known for: Human nutrition; K-ration; Mediterranean diet
- Spouse: Margaret Haney (m. 1939)
- Relatives: Lon Chaney (uncle)
- Scientific career
- Fields: Human nutrition; public health; epidemiology
- Institutions: University of Minnesota
- Academic advisors: August Krogh

Ancel Benjamin Keys (January 26, 1904 – November 20, 2004) was an American physiologist who studied the influence of diet on health. In particular, he hypothesized that replacing dietary saturated fat with polyunsaturated fat reduced cardiovascular diseases. Modern dietary recommendations by health organizations, and national health agencies corroborate this.

Keys studied starvation in men and published The Biology of Human Starvation (1950), which remains the only source of its kind. He examined the epidemiology of cardiovascular disease and was responsible for two famous diets: K-rations, formulated as balanced meals for combat soldiers in World War II, and the Mediterranean diet, which he popularized with his wife Margaret.

== Early life ==
Ancel Benjamin Keys was born in Colorado Springs on January 26, 1904, the son of Benjamin Pious Keys (1883–1961) and Carolyn Emma Chaney (1885–1960), the sister of actor and director Lon Chaney (1883–1930). In 1906 they moved to San Francisco before the 1906 San Francisco earthquake struck.

Shortly after the disaster, his family relocated to Berkeley where he grew up. Keys was intelligent as a boy. Lewis Terman, a noted psychologist and inventor of the Stanford-Binet IQ Test, described him as intellectually "gifted".

During his youth, he left high school to pursue odd jobs, such as shoveling bat guano in Arizona, being a powder monkey in a Colorado mine, and working in a lumber camp. He eventually finished his secondary education and was admitted to the University of California at Berkeley in 1922.

=== Higher education ===
At the University of California, Berkeley, Keys initially studied chemistry, but was dissatisfied and took some time off to work as an oiler aboard the American President Lines ship SS President Wilson, which traveled to China. He then returned to Berkeley, switched majors, and graduated with a B.A. in economics and political science (1925) and M.S. in zoology (1928).

For a brief time, he took up a job as a management trainee at Woolworth's, but returned to his studies at Scripps Institution of Oceanography in La Jolla on a fellowship.

In 1930, he received his Ph.D. in oceanography and biology from UC Berkeley. He was then awarded a National Research Council fellowship that took him to Copenhagen, Denmark to study under August Krogh at the Zoophysiological Laboratory for two years. During his studies with Krogh, he studied fish physiology and contributed numerous papers on the subject.

Once his fellowship ended, he went to Cambridge but took some time off to teach at Harvard University, after which he returned to Cambridge and earned a second Ph.D. in physiology (1936).

== Scientific work ==
=== Early physiology studies ===
While doing fish research at Scripps, Keys used statistical regressions to estimate the weight of fish from their length, at that time a pioneering use of biostatistics. Once in Copenhagen (1931), he continued to study fish physiology and developed techniques for gill perfusion that provided evidence that fish regulated their sodium by controlling chloride excretion through their gills. He used this perfusion method to study the effects of adrenaline and vasopressin ("pitressin") on gill fluid flow and osmotic regulation in fishes. He designed an improved Kjeldahl apparatus, which improved upon Krogh's earlier design, and allowed for more rapid determination of nitrogen content in biological samples. This proved useful for activities as diverse as determining the protein content in grasshopper eggs and anemia in humans.

While at Harvard's Fatigue Laboratory, he was inspired by his Cambridge mentor Joseph Barcroft's ascent to the top of Tenerife's highest peak, and his subsequent reports. Keys wrote up a proposal for an expedition to the Andes, suggesting the study could have practical value for Chilean miners who worked at high elevations. He was given the go-ahead and, in 1935, assembled a team to study the effects of high altitude on the body, such as how it affects blood pressure. He spent a couple of months at 9,500 feet (3,000 m.), and then five weeks at elevations of 15,000 to 20,000 feet (4,500 to 6,000 m.).

He noted there was no good way of predicting how well humans might adapt to high altitude, even if they adapted well to medium altitudes, a problem for potential pilots in a time before pressure control had become practical. From these studies he outlined the phenomenon of human physiological adaptation to environmental changes as a predictable event, a novel idea in a time when such parameters as blood pressure and resting heart-rate were considered immutable characteristics of individuals.

=== Development of K-rations ===
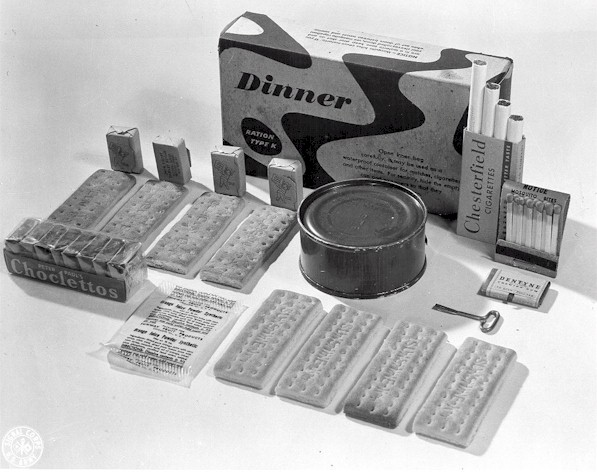
An example of a K-ration dinner. All the components were intended to fit into a box which would fit into a soldier's pocket

In 1936, Keys was offered a position at the Mayo Foundation in Rochester, where he continued his studies in physiology. He left after a year, citing an intellectually stifling environment where research was secondary to clinical "doc business" and playing bridge.

In 1937, he left the Mayo Foundation to teach physiology at the University of Minnesota, where he founded the Laboratory of Physiological Hygiene. His earlier research on human physiology led to an assignment with the Army Quartermaster Corps, where they worked to develop a more portable and nonperishable ration that would provide enough calories to sustain soldiers, such as paratroopers, in the field for up to two weeks.

This development did not begin without some turbulence. His colleague, Elsworth Buskirk, recalled:

When it appeared that the U.S. would be in World War II, Keys went to the Quartermaster Food and Container Institute in Chicago to inquire about emergency rations. The story goes that he was told to go home and leave such things to the professionals. Undissuaded, he went to William Wrigley's office and secured $10,000 for the development of an emergency ration. Then, he went to the Cracker Jack Company. They couldn't supply money, but did provide the water-tight small box concept. The result was the K-ration in sealed Cracker Jack boxes.

Once the basic design had been completed, the Navy, through the National Research Council, funded the testing of the K-rations on its sailors to determine their feasibility as a temporary and mobile food source. The initial ingredients of the K-ration were procured at a local Minneapolis grocery store—hard biscuits, dry sausage, hard candy, and chocolate. The final product was different from Keys' original ingredients, but most of Keys' suggestions made it to the final product.

The rations weighed only 28 oz (790 g), but provided 3,200 calories per day. Though several sources claim the name was unrelated to Keys, many historical references support the claim that the K-ration was indeed named after him. The K-ration became such a success that it was often used for more than temporary sustenance, becoming a major staple of military nutrition.

=== Starvation study ===
During World War II, Keys produced studies related to human physical performance that were of interest to the military, such as studying the effects of testosterone on muscle work and vitamin supplementation as a performance enhancer on adequately fed soldiers, among many other similar studies. It was during the war that Keys and fellow researchers recognized the importance of knowing how to properly treat widespread starvation, since simple overfeeding for so many would be imprecise and there was a potential that the refeeding would fail.

To gain insight into the physiology of starvation, in 1944 Keys carried out a starvation study with 36 conscientious objectors as test subjects in the Minnesota Starvation Experiment. At the time, conscientious objectors were being placed in camps, with a few functioning like the Civilian Public Service, so that recruiting them would prove easier than seeking out volunteers in the general population. The original pool of 400 responders was reduced to 36 selectees, of whom 32 would go on to complete the study.

The main focus of the study was threefold: set a metabolic baseline for three months, study the physical and mental effects of starvation on the volunteers for six months, and then study the physical and mental effects of different refeeding protocols on them for three months. The participants were first placed on the three-month baseline diet of 3,200 calories, after which their calories were reduced to 1,800 calories/day, while expending 3,000 calories in activities such as walking. The final three months were a refeeding period where the volunteers were divided into four groups, each receiving a different caloric intake.

The war came to an end before the final results of the study could be published, but Keys sent his findings to various international relief agencies throughout Europe. In 1950, he completed publication of his two-volume 1385-page Biology of Human Starvation.

=== Seven Countries Study ===
His interest in diet and cardiovascular disease (CVD) was prompted, in part, by seemingly counter-intuitive data: American business executives, presumably among the best-fed people, had high rates of heart disease, while in post-war Europe CVD rates had decreased sharply in the wake of reduced food supplies. Keys postulated a correlation between cholesterol levels and CVD and initiated a study of Minnesota businessmen, the first prospective study of CVD. At a 1955 expert meeting at the World Health Organization in Geneva, Keys presented his diet-lipid-heart disease hypothesis. As part of his argument, he presented a correlation between deaths from heart disease and percentage of fat in the diet that featured six countries. His rationale and conclusions were heavily critiqued by two other epidemiologists.

After observing in southern Italy the highest concentration of centenarians in the world, Keys hypothesized that a Mediterranean-style diet low in animal fat protected against heart disease and that a diet high in animal fats led to heart disease. This finding helped Keys initiate a long-term observational study, known as the Seven Countries Study, which appeared to show that serum cholesterol was strongly related to coronary heart disease mortality, both at the population and individual levels.

Keys had concluded that saturated fats as found in milk and meat have adverse effects, while unsaturated fats found in vegetable oils had beneficial effects. Keys stated that of the 12,000 men in seven countries studied in 1960, those least likely to develop cardiovascular disease lived in Crete.

After Keys' retirement from the University of Minnesota in 1972, his protege Henry Blackburn, MD became director of the Laboratory of Physiological Hygiene. Blackburn continued research on the role of lifestyle including diet in the cause and prevention of heart disease. The department played an active role in multicenter trials of the 1970s–80s and population strategies of surveillance and preventive interventions in Minnesota.

=== Keys equation ===
The Keys equation predicts the effect of saturated and polyunsaturated fatty acids in the diet on serum cholesterol levels. Keys found that saturated fats increase total and LDL cholesterol twice as much as polyunsaturated fats lower them.

Change in serum cholesterol concentration

(mmol/L) = 0.031(2D_{sf} − D_{puf}) + 1.5√D_{ch}

where D_{sf} is the change in percentage of dietary energy from saturated fats, D_{puf} is the change in percentage of dietary energy from polyunsaturated fats, and D_{ch} is the change in intake of dietary cholesterol.

=== BMI and other contributions ===
In a 1972 article, Keys and his coauthors promoted Adolphe Quetelet's body mass index (BMI), arguing it was "preferable over other indices of relative weight on [correlation with height and measures of body fatness] as well as on the simplicity of the calculation and, in contrast to percentage of average weight, the applicability to all populations at all times", which the U.S. National Institutes of Health then popularized in 1985.

Keys was always considered an interventionist. He generally shunned food fads and vigorously promoted the putative benefits of the "reasonably low-fat diets" which he contrasted with "the North American habit for making the stomach the garbage disposal unit for a long list of harmful foods." Because of his influence in dietary science, Keys was featured on the cover of the January 13, 1961, issue of Time magazine.

== Later years and death ==
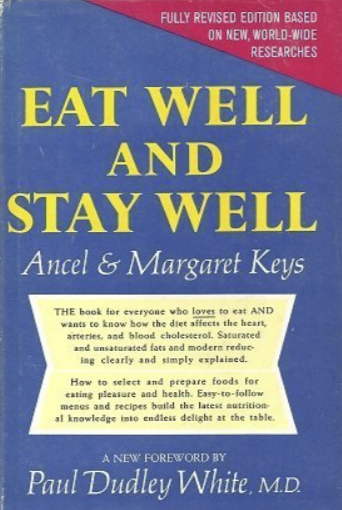
Eat Well Stay Well, 1963

When Keys was hired at the Mayo Foundation in 1936, he hired Margaret Haney (1909–2006) as a medical technologist. In 1939 they married and had three children: Carrie D'Andrea, Henry Keys, and Martha McLain. Carrie became a clinical psychologist and Henry became a physician and cancer researcher. Both are well respected contributors to their fields. Martha was shot dead by a thief in 1991 when she was 42.

Together, Margaret and Keys co-authored three books, two of them bestsellers. They earned enough royalties to build Minnelea, their villa in the seaside village of Pioppi, in the Cilento region on the southwest coast of Italy, where Keys lived and worked from 1963 to 1998. They also traveled the world, going to places like Japan and South Africa to record data for Keys's published works, such as the Seven Countries Study. The village of Pioppi became the location of the Living Museum of the Mediterranean Diet, which houses a documentary, photograph and film archive regarding the historic, scientific, and cultural background of the Mediterranean diet.

In 1961, Keys appeared on the To Tell The Truth game show as the inventor of K-Rations, fooling two of the four panelists.

Keys received three notable awards: Commander, Order of the Lion of Finland (1963), the McCollum Award from the American Society of Clinical Nutrition (1967), and an honorary doctor of science from the University of Minnesota (2001).

On January 26, 2004, Keys celebrated his 100th birthday.

Keys died on November 20, 2004, in Minneapolis, two months before his 101st birthday.

Keys was an atheist.

== Criticism ==
Keys has received criticism from the low-carbohydrate diet community, who have argued that his Seven Countries Study excluded countries that did not fit his hypothesis. Critics raised four primary objections to the Seven Countries Study, including (1) countries were selected and excluded based on a desired outcome; (2) France, a high-fat, low-heart disease country, was purposefully excluded from the survey; (3) dietary data in Greece taken during Lent introduced a distortion; and (4) sugar was not considered as a possible contributor to coronary heart disease.

In response to this criticism, in August 2017, the True Health Initiative released a 65-page white paper entitled "Ancel Keys and the Seven Countries Study: An Evidence-based Response to Revisionist Histories," correcting what they felt were historical inaccuracies and errors that low-carb advocates had perpetuated.

== Books ==
- Keys, A.; Brozek, J.; Henschel, A.; Mickelsen, O.; Taylor, H. L. (1950). The Biology of Human Starvation (2 volumes). University of Minnesota Press. ISBN 978-0-8166-7234-9.
- —; Keys, Margaret (1959). Eat Well and Stay Well. Doubleday. LCCN 59-6361.
- —; Keys, Margaret (1967). The Benevolent Bean. Doubleday. LCCN 67-12853.
- —; Keys, Margaret (1975). How to Eat Well and Stay Well the Mediterranean Way. Doubleday. ISBN 978-0-385-00906-5.
- — (1980). Seven Countries: A Multivariate Analysis of Death and Coronary Heart Disease. Harvard University Press. ISBN 978-0-674-49788-7.
- — (1999). Adventures of a Medical Scientist: Sixty Years of Research in Thirteen Countries. memoir, privately published. ISBN 978-0-9672072-0-9.
