= Saturated fat =

Fat in which the fatty acid chains have all or predominantly single bonds

A lipid which has no double bonds in its hydrocarbon chain.

A saturated fat is a type of fat: a glyceride in which the fatty acid chains have all single bonds between the carbon atoms. Glyceride fats with single bonds are called saturated because they are "saturated with" hydrogen atoms, having no C=C double bonds available to react with hydrogen.

Saturated fats are generally solid at room temperature. All fats, both saturated and unsaturated, contain 9kcal (37.7 kJ) per gram, making them more energy dense than both proteins and carbohydrates.

Most animal fats are saturated. The fats of plants and fish are generally unsaturated. Various foods contain different proportions of saturated and unsaturated. Many processed foods, like foods deep-fried in hydrogenated oil and sausages, are high in saturated fat content. Some store-bought baked goods are as well, especially those containing partially hydrogenated oils. Other examples of foods containing a high proportion of saturated fat and dietary cholesterol include animal fat products such as lard or schmaltz, fatty meats and dairy products made with whole or reduced fat milk like yogurt, ice cream, cheese and butter. Certain vegetable products have high saturated fat content, such as coconut oil and palm kernel oil.

Guidelines released by many medical organizations, including the World Health Organization, have advocated for reduction in the intake of saturated fat to promote health and reduce the risk from cardiovascular diseases.

== Saturated fatty acids that comprise saturated fat ==
Some common examples of saturated fatty acids:

- Lauric acid with 12 carbon atoms (contained in coconut oil, palm kernel oil, cow's milk, and breast milk)
- Myristic acid with 14 carbon atoms (contained in cow's milk and dairy products)
- Palmitic acid with 16 carbon atoms (contained in palm oil and meat)
- Stearic acid with 18 carbon atoms (also contained in meat and cocoa butter)

While nutrition labels regularly combine them, the saturated fatty acids appear in different proportions among food groups. Lauric and myristic acids are most commonly found in "tropical" oils (e.g., palm kernel, coconut) and dairy products. The saturated fat in meat, eggs, cacao, and nuts is primarily the triglycerides of palmitic and stearic acids.

Saturated fat profile of common foods; Esterified fatty acids as percentage of total fat
Food	Lauric acid	Myristic acid	Palmitic acid	Stearic acid
Coconut oil	47%	18%	9%	3%
Palm kernel oil	48%	1%	44%	5%
Butter	3%	11%	29%	13%
Ground beef	0%	4%	26%	15%
Salmon	0%	1%	29%	3%
Egg yolks	0%	0.3%	27%	10%
Cashews	2%	1%	10%	7%
Soybean oil	0%	0%	11%	4%
Cocoa butter	1%	0–4%	24.5–33.7%	33.7–40.2%

== Proportions of saturated fat in foods ==

Fat composition as weight percentage of total fat
Food	Saturated (%)	Mono- unsaturated (%)	Poly- unsaturated (%)
Cooking oils
Algal oil	4	92	4
Canola	8	64	28
Coconut oil	87	13	0
Corn oil	13	24	59
Cottonseed oil	27	19	54
Olive oil	14	73	11
Palm kernel oil	86	12	2
Palm oil	51	39	10
Peanut oil	17	46	32
Rice bran oil	25	38	37
Safflower oil, high oleic	6	75	14
Safflower oil, linoleic	6	14	75
Soybean oil	15	24	58
Sunflower oil	11	20	69
Mustard oil	11	59	21
Dairy products
Butterfat	66	30	4
Cheese, regular	64	29	3
Cheese, light	60	30	0
Ice cream, gourmet	62	29	4
Ice cream, light	62	29	4
Milk, whole	62	28	4
Milk, 2%	62	30	0
Whipping cream*	66	26	5
Meats
Beef	33	38	5
Ground sirloin	38	44	4
Pork chop	35	44	8
Ham	35	49	16
Chicken breast	29	34	21
Chicken	34	23	30
Turkey breast	30	20	30
Turkey drumstick	32	22	30
Fish, orange roughy	23	15	46
Salmon	28	33	28
Hot dog, beef	42	48	5
Hot dog, turkey	28	40	22
Burger, fast food	36	44	6
Cheeseburger, fast food	43	40	7
Breaded chicken sandwich	20	39	32
Grilled chicken sandwich	26	42	20
Sausage, Polish	37	46	11
Sausage, turkey	28	40	22
Pizza, sausage	41	32	20
Pizza, cheese	60	28	5
Nuts
Almonds dry roasted	9	65	21
Cashews dry roasted	20	59	17
Macadamia dry roasted	15	79	2
Peanut dry roasted	14	50	31
Pecans dry roasted	8	62	25
Flaxseeds, ground	8	23	65
Sesame seeds	14	38	44
Soybeans	14	22	57
Sunflower seeds	11	19	66
Walnuts dry roasted	9	23	63
Sweets and baked goods
Candy, chocolate bar	59	33	3
Candy, fruit chews	14	44	38
Cookie, oatmeal raisin	22	47	27
Cookie, chocolate chip	35	42	18
Cake, yellow	60	25	10
Pastry, Danish	50	31	14
Fats added during cooking or at the table
Butter, stick	63	29	3
Butter, whipped	62	29	4
Margarine, stick	18	39	39
Margarine, tub	16	33	49
Margarine, light tub	19	46	33
Lard	39	45	11
Shortening	25	45	26
Chicken fat	30	45	21
Beef fat	41	43	3
Goose fat	33	55	11
Dressing, blue cheese	16	54	25
Dressing, light Italian	14	24	58
Other
Egg yolk fat	36	44	16
Avocado	16	71	13
Unless else specified in boxes, then reference is:
* 3% is trans fats

== Association with diseases ==
=== Cardiovascular disease ===
The effect of saturated fat on heart disease has been extensively studied. Saturated fat intake increases low-density lipoprotein cholesterol (LDL-C) concentrations. The American Heart Association has stated that "the scientific rationale for decreasing saturated fat in the diet has been and remains based on well-established effects of saturated fat to raise low-density lipoprotein (LDL) cholesterol, a leading cause of atherosclerosis".

Many health authorities, such as the American Heart Association, the Academy of Nutrition and Dietetics, the British Dietetic Association, the World Heart Federation, the British National Health Service, among others, advise that saturated fat is a risk factor for cardiovascular diseases. In 2020, the World Health Organization recommended lowering dietary intake of saturated fats to less than 10% of total energy consumption, and increasing intake of unsaturated fats. There is moderate-quality evidence that reducing the proportion of saturated fat in the diet and replacing it with unsaturated fats or carbohydrates for a period of at least two years leads to a reduction in the risk of cardiovascular disease.

A 2017 review by the Sax Institute for the National Heart Foundation of Australia found that saturated fat consumption is associated with higher mortality and that replacement of saturated fat with polyunsaturated fat decreases risk of cardiovascular disease events and mortality. In 2019, the UK Scientific Advisory Committee on Nutrition concluded that higher saturated fat consumption is associated with raised blood cholesterol and increased risk of cardiovascular disease.

A 2021 review found that diets high in saturated fat were associated with higher mortality from all causes, as well as from cardiovascular disease.

A 2023 review by the World Health Organization found convincing evidence that higher saturated fat consumption is associated with higher coronary heart disease incidence and mortality.

A 2023 review by the Academy of Nutrition and Dietetics found moderate certainty evidence to support reducing saturated fat intake for reduced risk of CVD and CVD events.

A scoping review for Nordic Nutrition Recommendations 2023 found that partial replacement of saturated fatty acid with omega-6 fatty acid decreases the risk of cardiovascular disease and improves the blood lipid profile.

A 2024 meta-analysis found that odd-chain and longer-chain saturated fatty acids were negatively associated with the risk of cardiovascular disease, including stroke.

=== Dyslipidemia ===
The consumption of saturated fat is generally considered a risk factor for dyslipidemia, which in turn is a risk factor for some types of cardiovascular disease.

Abnormal blood lipid levels – high total cholesterol, high levels of triglycerides, high levels of low-density lipoprotein (LDL) or low levels of high-density lipoprotein (HDL) cholesterol – are associated with increased risk of heart disease and stroke.

Meta-analyses have found a significant relationship between saturated fat and serum cholesterol levels. High total cholesterol levels, which may be caused by many factors, are associated with an increased risk of cardiovascular disease.

There are other pathways involving obesity, triglyceride levels, insulin sensitivity, endothelial function, and thrombogenicity, among others, that play a role in cardiovascular disease. Different saturated fatty acids have differing effects on various lipid levels. There is strong evidence that lauric, myristic, and palmitic acids raise LDL-C, while stearic acid is more neutral.

=== Type 2 diabetes ===
A 2022 review of cohort studies found that the risk of type 2 diabetes was not associated with dietary intake of total saturated fats, palmitic acid, and stearic acid. Dietary lauric acid and myristic acid in particular, present in some tropical plant oils and also in dairy fat, were associated with reduced risk of diabetes.

=== Cancer ===
Several reviews of case–control studies have found that saturated fat intake is associated with breast cancer risk and mortality. Observational studies have shown that a diet high in saturated fat is associated with increased prostate cancer risk.

A 2024 systematic review found that higher levels of myristic acid, palmitic acid and stearic acid are associated with increased cancer risk. A 2026 umbrella review found that saturated fat intake was associated with several site-specific cancers including breast and liver cancers.

== Dietary sources ==
Properties of vegetable oils The nutritional values are expressed as percent (%) by mass of total fat.
Type	Processing treatment	Saturated fatty acids	Monounsaturated fatty acids		Polyunsaturated fatty acids				Smoke point
Type	Processing treatment	Saturated fatty acids	Total	Oleic acid (ω−9)	Total	α-Linolenic acid (ω−3)	Linoleic acid (ω−6)	ω−6:3 ratio	Smoke point
Avocado		11.6	70.6	67.9	13.5	1	12.5	12.5:1	250 °C (482 °F)
Brazil nut		17.6	26.7	26.1	55.7	0.1	55.6	457:1	208 °C (406 °F)
Canola		7.4	63.3	61.8	28.1	9.1	18.6	2:1	204 °C (400 °F)
Coconut		82.5	6.3	6	1.7	0.019	1.68	88:1	175 °C (347 °F)
Corn		12.9	27.6	27.3	54.7	1	58	58:1	232 °C (450 °F)
Cottonseed		25.9	17.8	19	51.9	1	54	54:1	216 °C (420 °F)
Cottonseed	hydrogenated	93.6	1.5		0.6	0.2	0.3	1.5:1	
Flaxseed/linseed		9.0	18.4	18	67.8	53	13	0.2:1	107 °C (225 °F)
Grape seed		9.6	16.1	15.8	69.9	0.10	69.6	very high	216 °C (421 °F)
Hemp seed		7.0	9.0	9.0	82.0	22.0	54.0	2.5:1	166 °C (330 °F)
High-oleic safflower oil		7.5	75.2	75.2	12.8	0	12.8	very high	212 °C (414 °F)
Olive (extra virgin)		13.8	73.0	71.3	10.5	0.7	9.8	14:1	193 °C (380 °F)
Palm		49.3	37.0	40	9.3	0.2	9.1	45.5:1	235 °C (455 °F)
Palm	hydrogenated	88.2	5.7		0				
Peanut		16.2	57.1	55.4	19.9	0.318	19.6	61.6:1	232 °C (450 °F)
Rice bran oil		25	38.4	38.4	36.6	2.2	34.4	15.6:1	232 °C (450 °F)
Sesame		14.2	39.7	39.3	41.7	0.3	41.3	138:1	
Soybean		15.6	22.8	22.6	57.7	7	51	7.3:1	238 °C (460 °F)
Soybean	partially hydrogenated	14.9	43.0	42.5	37.6	2.6	34.9	13.4:1	
Sunflower oil		8.99	63.4	62.9	20.7	0.16	20.5	128:1	227 °C (440 °F)
Walnut oil	unrefined	9.1	22.8	22.2	63.3	10.4	52.9	5:1	160 °C (320 °F)

== Dietary recommendations ==
Recommendations to reduce, limit or replace dietary intake of trans fats and saturated fats, in favor of unsaturated fats, are made by the World Health Organization, (Note: See the article Food pyramid (nutrition) for more information.) American Heart Association, Health Canada, the US Department of Health and Human Services, the UK National Health Service, the UK Scientific Advisory Committee on Nutrition, the Australian Department of Health and Aging, the Singapore Ministry of Health, the Indian Ministry of Health and Family Welfare, the New Zealand Ministry of Health, and Hong Kong's Department of Health.

In 2003, the World Health Organization (WHO) and Food and Agriculture Organization (FAO) expert consultation report concluded:

The evidence shows that intake of saturated fatty acids is directly related to cardiovascular risk. The traditional target is to restrict the intake of saturated fatty acids to less than 10% of daily energy intake and less than 7% for high-risk groups. If populations are consuming less than 10%, they should not increase that level of intake. Within these limits, the intake of foods rich in myristic and palmitic acids should be replaced by fats with a lower content of these particular fatty acids. In developing countries, however, where energy intake for some population groups may be inadequate, energy expenditure is high and body fat stores are low (BMI <18.5 kg/m^{2}). The amount and quality of fat supply have to be considered keeping in mind the need to meet energy requirements. Specific sources of saturated fat, such as coconut and palm oil, provide low-cost energy and may be an important source of energy for the poor.

A 2004 statement released by the Centers for Disease Control (CDC) determined that "Americans need to continue working to reduce saturated fat intake…" In addition, reviews by the American Heart Association led the Association to recommend reducing saturated fat intake to less than 7% of total calories according to its 2006 recommendations. This concurs with similar conclusions made by the US Department of Health and Human Services, which determined that reduction in saturated fat consumption would positively affect health and reduce the prevalence of heart disease.

The United Kingdom, National Health Service claims the majority of British people eat too much saturated fat. The British Heart Foundation also advises people to cut down on saturated fat, and to read labels on the food they buy. The British Nutrition Foundation have said that based on the totality of available evidence the saturated fatty acids should make up no more than 10% of total dietary energy.

A 2004 review stated that "no lower safe limit of specific saturated fatty acid intakes has been identified" and recommended that the influence of varying saturated fatty acid intakes against a background of different individual lifestyles and genetic backgrounds should be the focus in future studies.

Blanket recommendations to lower saturated fat were criticized at a 2010 conference debate of the American Dietetic Association for focusing too narrowly on reducing saturated fats rather than emphasizing increased consumption of healthy fats and unrefined carbohydrates. Concern was expressed over the health risks of replacing saturated fats in the diet with refined carbohydrates, which carry a high risk of obesity and heart disease, particularly at the expense of polyunsaturated fats which may have health benefits. None of the panelists recommended heavy consumption of saturated fats, emphasizing instead the importance of overall dietary quality to cardiovascular health.

In a 2017 comprehensive review of the literature and clinical trials, the American Heart Association published a recommendation that saturated fat intake be reduced or replaced by products containing monounsaturated and polyunsaturated fats, a dietary adjustment that could reduce the risk of cardiovascular diseases by 30%.

== Molecular description ==
Two-dimensional representation of the saturated fatty acid myristic acid

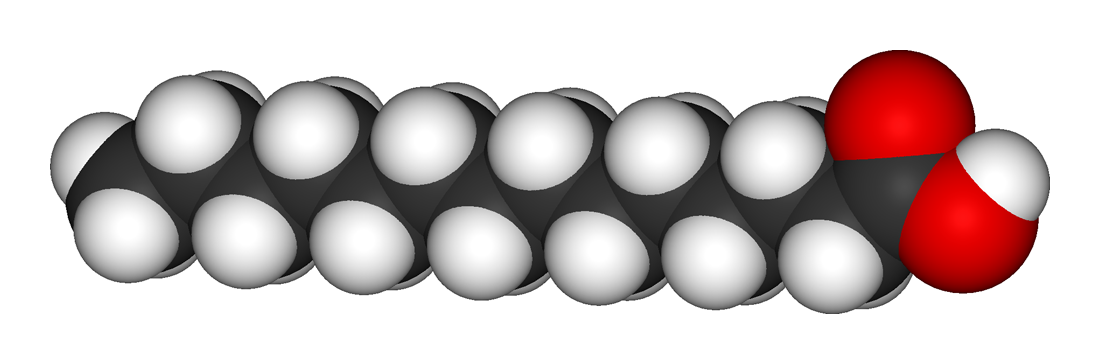
A space-filling model of the saturated fatty acid myristic acid

The two-dimensional illustration has implicit hydrogen atoms bonded to each of the carbon atoms in the polycarbon tail of the myristic acid molecule (there are 13 carbon atoms in the tail; 14 carbon atoms in the entire molecule).

Carbon atoms are also implicitly drawn, as they are portrayed as intersections between two straight lines. "Saturated," in general, refers to a maximum number of hydrogen atoms bonded to each carbon of the polycarbon tail as allowed by the Octet Rule. This also means that only single bonds (sigma bonds) will be present between adjacent carbon atoms of the tail.

== See also ==
- List of saturated fatty acids
- List of vegetable oils
- Food guide pyramid
- Healthy diet
- Diet and heart disease
- Fast food
- Junk food
- Advanced glycation endproduct
- ANGPTL4
- Iodine value
- Framingham Heart Study
- Seven Countries Study
- Ancel Keys
- D. Mark Hegsted
- Western pattern diet
